= List of kings of Copán =

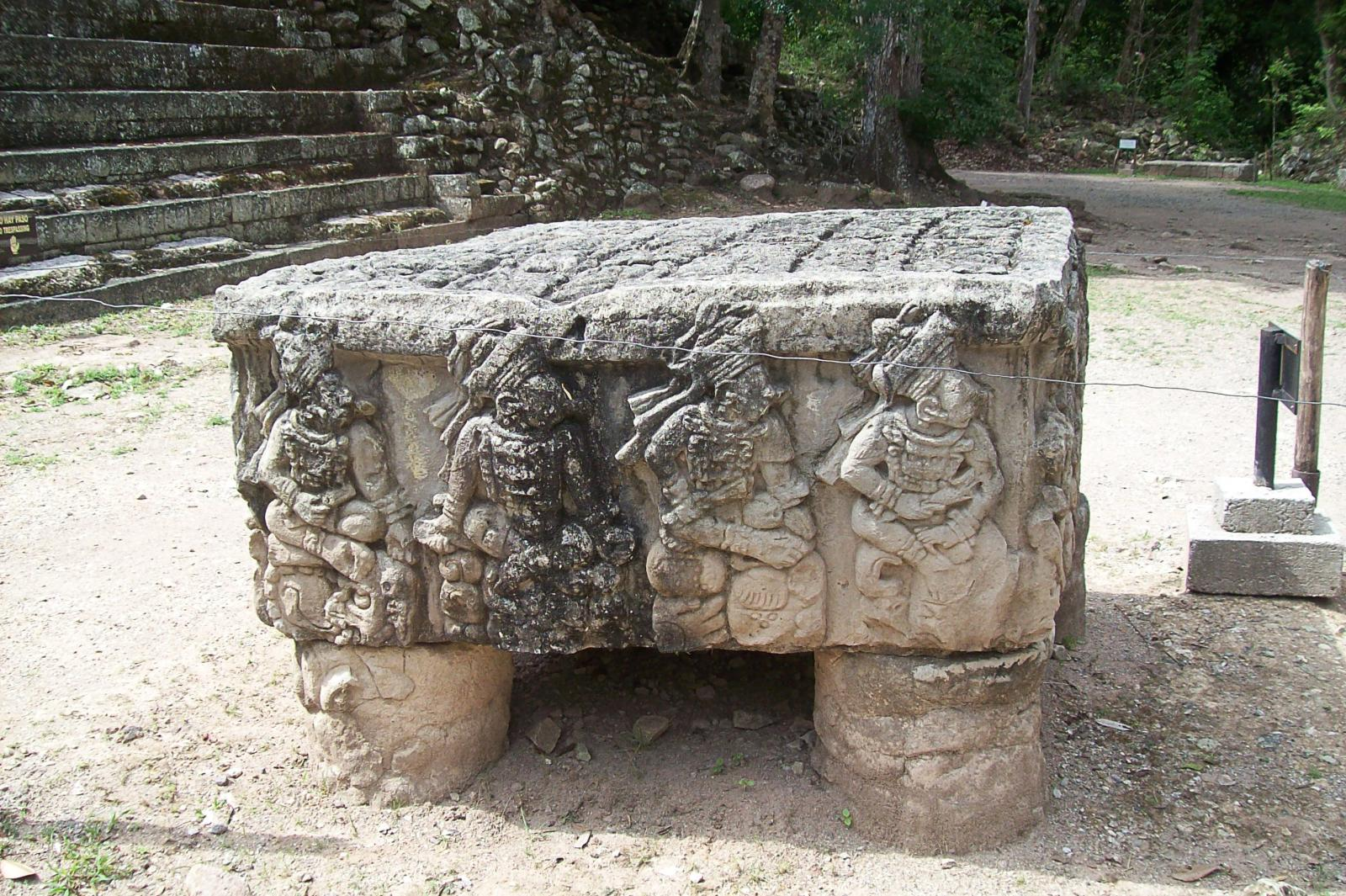
Altar Q, erected by King Yax Pac in 776 AD. The 16 kings of Copan, beginning with Yax Kuk Mo in 426 AD., is portrayed each in chronological order. Each king is seated on a version of his particular name glyph.

This is a list of the kings of the ancient Maya city-state Copán (current western Honduras). The list only includes kings after 426 when K'inich Yax K'uk' Mo' reformed Copán.

Copán was ruled by the Yax Kuk Mo dynasty, installed in 426, by Teotihuacan influence and support of the king Sihyaj Chan K'awiil II of Tikal, ruled between the 5th and 9th century. The architectural works (buildings, pyramids, statues, temples, altars and sports centers) built in Copán during the government of the Yax K'uk Mo' dynasty are preserved today, being accessible to the general public. Yax Kuk Mo means First Quetzal Macaw.

| Name (or nickname) | Ruled | Image | Dynastic succession no. | Alternative Names |
|---|---|---|---|---|
| K'inich Yax K'uk' Mo' | 426 - c. 437 | | 1 | Great-Sun First Quetzal Macaw |
| K'inich Popol Hol | c. 437 | | 2 | Great-Sun |
| name unknown | c. 455 | | 3 | Ruler 3 |
| Ku Ix | c. 465 | | 4 | K'altuun Hix, Tuun K'ab' Hix |
| name unknown | c. 476 | | 5 | Ruler 5 |
| Muyal Jol | c. 485 | | 6 | Ruler 6 |
| B'alam Nehn | 504–544 | | 7 | Jaguar Mirror; Waterlily-Jaguar |
| Wil Ohl K'inich | 532–551 | | 8 | Ruler 8; Head on Earth |
| Sak-Lu | 551–553 | | 9 | Ruler 9 |
| Tzi-B'alam | 553–578 | | 10 | Moon Jaguar |
| K'ak' Chan Yopaat | 578–628 | | 11 | B'utz' Chan; Smoke Serpent |
| Chan Imix K'awiil | 628–695 | | 12 | Smoke Jaguar |
| Uaxaclajuun Ub'aah K'awiil | 695–738 | | 13 | 18 Rabbit |
| K'ak' Joplaj Chan K'awiil | 738–749 | | 14 | Smoke Monkey |
| K'ak' Yipyaj Chan K'awiil | 749–763 | | 15 | Smoke Shell; Smoke Squirrel |
| Yax Pasaj Chan Yopaat | 763–after 810 | | 16 | Yax Pac |
| Ukit Took | 822 | | 17? | – |

Copán was completely abandoned around the year 827 AD.
