= Honduras Tips =

Honduran travel guide

Honduras Tips.hn
- Editor: Grupo OPSA
- Former editors: John Dupuis
- Frequency: Bi-yearly
- First issue: 1994
- Country: Honduras
- Based in: Honduras
- Language: English, Spanish
- Website: www.hondurastips.hn

Honduras Tips is a free English- and Spanish-language magazine that the Honduras Tourism Board named the official travel guide of Honduras. The guide is organized by city and destination, and includes practical advice and a directory of hotels, restaurants, bars, nightclubs and other entertainment venues.

== History ==
The guide was created in 1994 by John Dupuis, who was born in Mexico City and moved to Honduras in 1993. Its original name was Copán Tips, and the booklet contained geographic data from the department of Copán, Honduras and other travel information from the neighboring regions. In 1997 Copán Tips was renamed to Honduras Tips, expanding the coverage from Copán to the entire country.

In 1997 the Honduras Tourism Board named the magazine the "official guide to Honduras."

In 2010, Dupuis sold Honduras Tips to the OPSA Group—the largest publishing group in Honduras. It has offices in both Tegucigalpa, capital city of Honduras and San Pedro Sula, in the northern department of Cortés.
