= Oropendola temple =

The Orodenola temple also known as the Golden Oriole temple is a pre-Columbian building of the Maya civilization in Copán, Honduras. This is located within structure 16. This temple is part of the constructions that make up the Acropolis of Copán, which includes several plazas and important structures.

== History ==
The building remains a mysterious object within the city. It was possibly built between the 5th and 6th centuries AD, when the city was expanding and forming new urban layouts, especially in its ceremonial center. Studies suggest that the tomb could house the remains of some king of Copan possibly between the eight and ninth in the Yax K'uk' Mo' dynasty. During the years 2007–2008, intensive investigations were carried out in the rooms of Oropendola and in front of its perimeter.

=== Discoveries ===
During the investigation process of the central room of the building, a series of patterns of religious behavior could be observed that indicated the sacred nature of the space and possible markers of ancestral commemoration. Among them are a series of tuff stone slabs located in a north–south direction, an intrusion in the north wall, evidence of offerings deposited on the floor and the remains of a hearth that contained ceramic material fundamental to dating the period of occupation of the structure.

The tom inside temple contained a total of 24 ceramic pieces, 520 shell artifacts, 99 complete seashell valves from the Pacific Ocean. He also had a total of 1,600 slices of green obsidian from Pachuca and 2,041 grams of jade including anklets, ear cuffs, necklaces, and pectorals; as well as some mica sheets and pyrite and shell mirrors.

== See also ==
- Margarita Tomb
- Maya society
