= Robert Sharer =

American archaeologist (1940–2012)

Robert James Sharer (March 16, 1940 – September 20, 2012) was an American archaeologist, academic and Mayanist researcher. He was known for his archaeological investigations at a number of pre-Columbian Mesoamerican sites conducted over a career spanning four decades, and for his archaeological reports, theorizing, and writings in his field of specialty, the ancient Maya civilization. Sharer was a lecturer and professor at the University of Pennsylvania's Department of Anthropology for more than 30 years, and as of 2008, occupied the endowed chair of Sally and Alvin V. Shoemaker Professor in Anthropology, an appointment which he held beginning in 1995. He also had an extensive association with Penn's University Museum of archaeology and anthropology, where from 1987 to 2009 he was the curator-in-charge of the museum's American collection and research section. He died on September 20, 2012.

He was the author of Daily Life in Maya Civilization (Greenwood Press 2009), which appeared in two editions; and, with Loa P. Traxler, The Ancient Maya (Stanford University Press, 2006), which appeared in six editions.

== Early life and education ==
Robert Sharer was born in Battle Creek, Michigan, and received his bachelor's degree in history from Michigan State University. While there, he became interested in archeology while working a summer job as an undergrad at the Michigan State University Museum.

While attending the University of Pennsylvania, Sharer would participate in excavation projects in Cornwall under archaeologist Bernard Wailes, an experience that assisted in his development as an archaeologist. From 1963 to 1965, Sharer served in the United States Armed Forces, taking a break from his graduate program. After returning from his service, Sharer was guided by William Robertson Coe II while writing his thesis on the collection Coe unearthed at El Trapiche, an early precinct of the site of Chalchuapa in El Salvador. In 1967, Sharer received his graduate degree; in 1968, he received his doctorate.

== Archaeological work ==
Sharer once took a course in Mayan ethnography and spent a summer of research in Guatemala. He directed an excavation of Quiriguá, now a UNESCO World Heritage site, from 1974 to 1979. His findings noted the complexities in Mayan sociopolitical structures, trade, and cultural development. These findings challenged previous interpretations of Quiriguá's history, especially in regard to its origins, growth, and the roles of its rulers.

Another significant project Sharer participated in was his work in Copán, Honduras (1988–2003). His discoveries include the tomb of the 5th-century Mayan King, K'inich Yax K'uk' Mo'.

== See also ==
- "Works of Robert Sharer". Google Scholar.
