= John G. Owens =

American archaeologist and ethnologist

John G. Owens (27 September 1865 – 18 February 1893) was an American archaeologist who specialized in Mayan culture, and who also published ethnological studies on the Pueblo Indians of the American Southwest.

He was born in Lewisburg, Pennsylvania, and graduated from Bucknell University in 1887. He received his master's degree from Harvard, and was the holder of the Hemenway Fellowship while he completed his doctorate under Professor Frederic Ward Putnam.

In 1892 Owens led the Harvard Peabody Museum's expedition to the Mayan city of Copán, Honduras, which began the excavation of the "Hieroglyphic Stairway" there. Unfortunately, prior to the completion of work, he was incapacitated by fever and died at Copán in 1893, where he is buried.

== Memorials ==
The John G. Owens Fellowship in Mesoamerican Archaeology was established at Harvard's Peabody Museum in his memory.

== Publications ==
- Owens, John G. (1891). "Some Games of the Zuni". Popular Science Monthly. 39: 39–50.
- Owens, John G. (1892). "Natal Ceremonies of the Hopi Indians". Journal American Ethnology and Archaeology. 2: 161–175.
