= Ruler 3 (Copán) =

- Ajaw

King of Copán
- Reign: c. 455 – c. 465
- Predecessor: Kʼinich Popol Hol
- Successor: Ku Ix
- Born: 5th century Copán
- Died: c. 465; Copán
- Issue: Ku Ix
- Father: Kʼinich Popol Hol
- Religion: Maya religion

Ruler 3 is the designated title for the third ruler of Copan after the reformation by K'inich Yax K'uk' Mo'.
