= Ruler 5 (Copán) =

- Ajaw

King of Copán
- Reign: c. 476 – c. 485
- Predecessor: Ku Ix
- Successor: Muyal Jol
- Born: 5th century Copán
- Died: c. 485; Copán
- Issue: Muyal Jol
- Father: Ku Ix
- Religion: Maya religion

Ruler 5 is the designated title for the fifth ruler of Copan after the reformation by K'inich Yax K'uk' Mo'.
