= Yax Kuk Mo dynasty =

Royal house of Copan, 426–810

Yax Kuk Mo Yax K'uk' Mo' Primer Quetzal Guacamayo
- Royal House
- Glyph of Copan used by the royal family
- Country: Kingdom of Oxwitik
- Current region: Honduras
- Founded: 426 AD
- Founder: K'inich Yax K'uk' Mo'
- Final head: Yax Pashah
- Titles: Ahau/Ajaw (My lord); k'ul ajaw (Heavenly lord); Ochk'in kaloomte (Lord of the west); King of Copan
- Dissolution: 810 AD

The Yax Kuk Mo dynasty was the royal house that reigned in the city-state of Copan (Oxwitik) for four centuries. This was installed in the city in the year 426 AD, due to Teotihuacan influence and military support from the ruler Sihyaj Chan K'awiil II of Tikal, who ruled between the 5th and 9th centuries. The architectural works (buildings, pyramids, statues, temples, altars and sports centers) built in Copán during the rule of the Yax K'uk Mo' dynasty are preserved to this day, being accessible to the general public. Yax Kuk Mo In mayan means First Quetzal Macaw.

== History ==
=== Origins ===
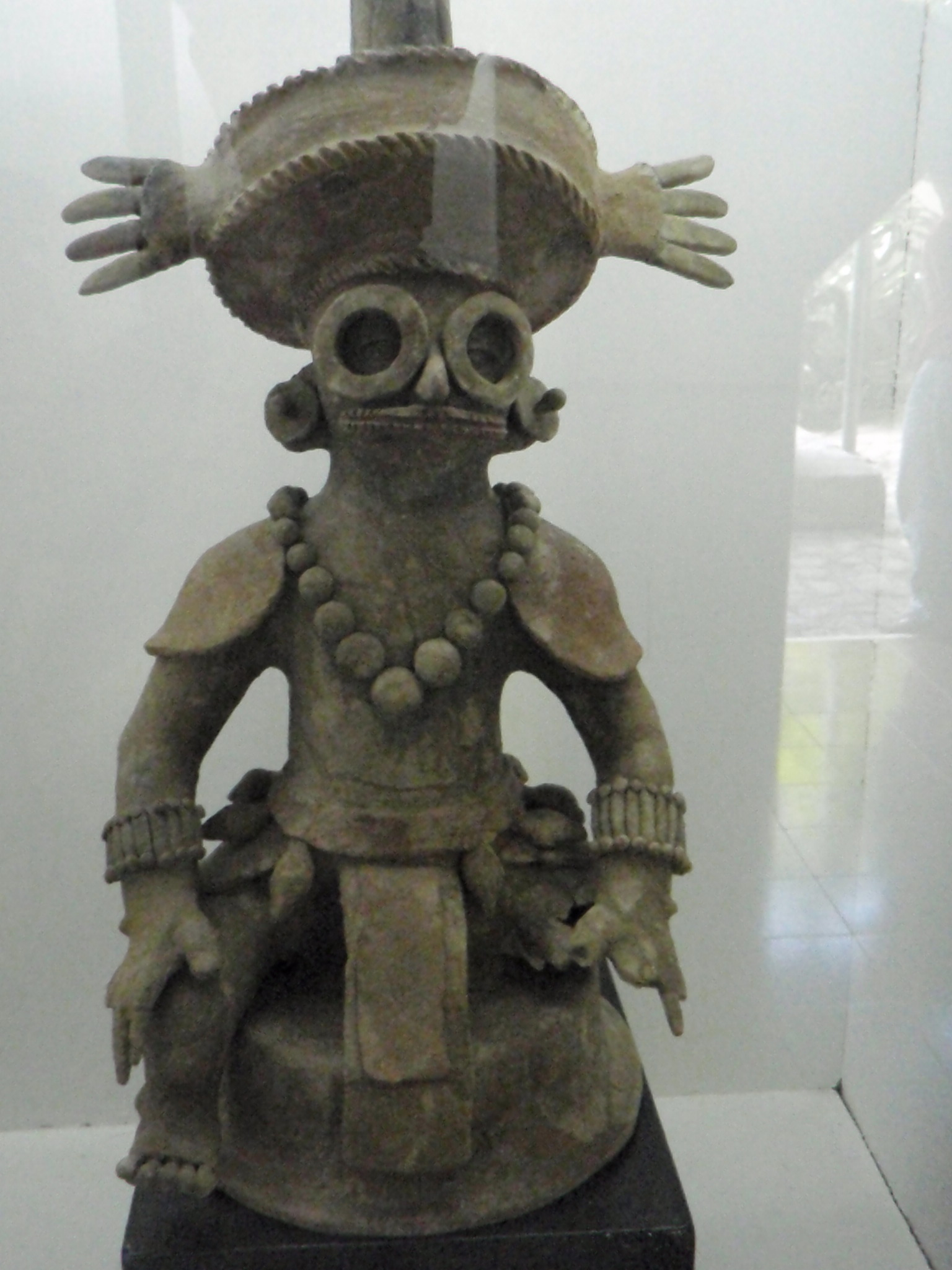
Incense burner that represents K'inich Yax K'uk' Mo'.

The city was re founded by king K'inich Yax K'uk' Mo', establishing it as the capital of a new Mayan kingdom named Oxwitik. Apparently, this operation was organized and directed from the city-state of Tikal. Mayan glyphs mention the arrival of a warrior named K'uk' Mo' Ajaw who installed himself on the throne of the city in the year 426 AD. C., receiving the new royal name of K'inich Yax K'uk' Mo' and the title of ochk'in kaloomte ("Lord of the West"), the same title used a generation earlier by King Siyaj K'ak', a general of the great metropolis of Teotihuacán that had intervened decisively in the politics of the center of the Petén basin and it was the most powerful and important city in Mesoamerica in the classical period.

K'inich Yax K'uk' Mo' was probably born and raised in Tikal, and some of his relatives lived in Teotihuacan. The king was likely patronized by Siyaj Chan K'awill II, the sixteenth ruler in the Tikal dynastic succession. K'inich Yax K'uk 'Mo' may have tried to legitimize his position as king by marrying into the old royal family of Copán, which is evidenced by the remains of his presumed consort. Analysis of her bones indicates that she was originally from Copán. After the establishment of the new Copán kingdom, the city remained closely allied with Tikal. The text on Altar Q describes how the founder received the royal scepter. The ceremonies involved in the founding of the Copán Yax Kuk Mo dynasty also included the installation of a subordinate king at Quiriguá. A text from Tikal mentioning K'uk' Mo' has been dated to AD 406. C., 20 years before K'uk' Mo' Ajaw founded the new Copán dynasty. It is likely that both names refer to the same person originally from Tikal.

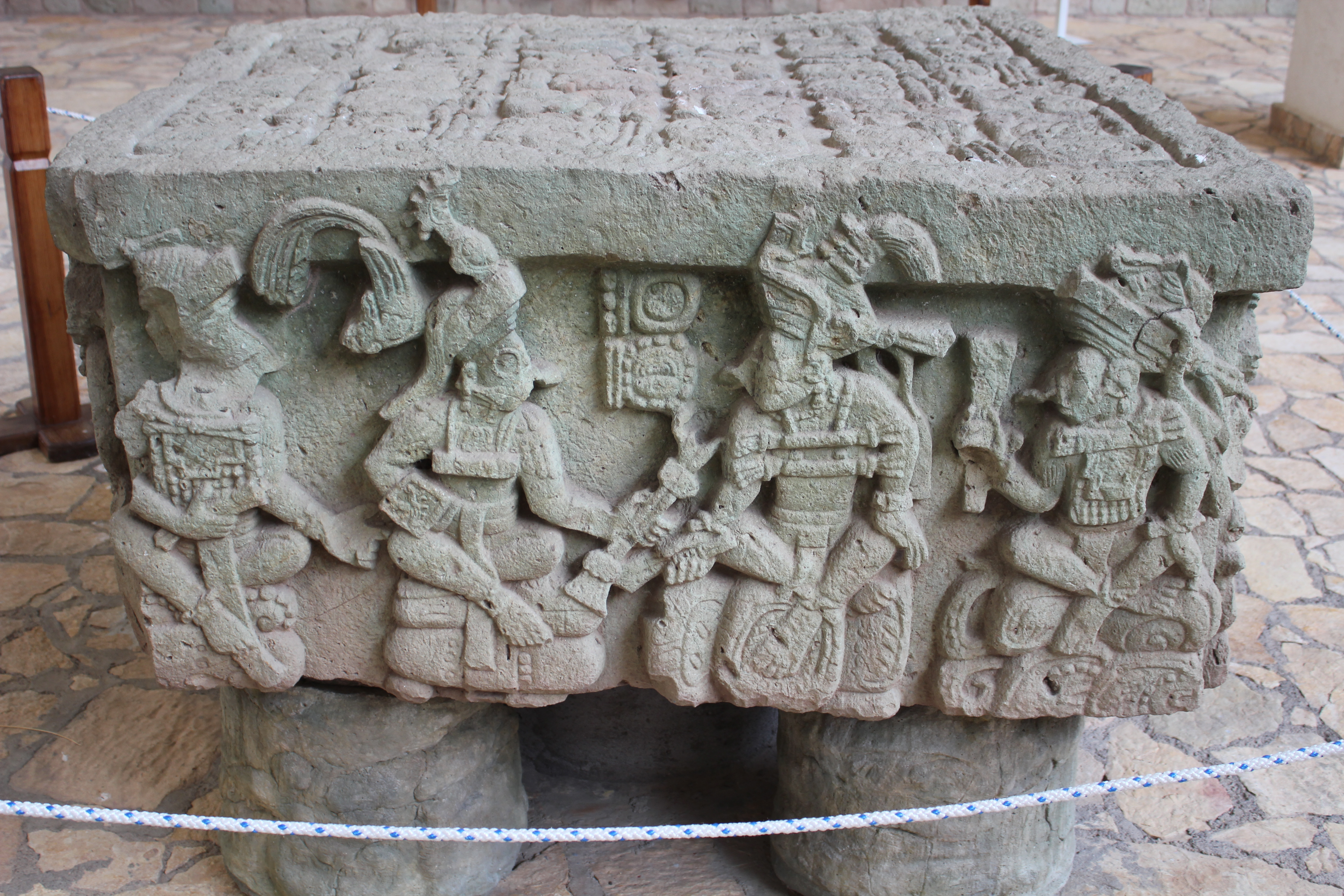
Altar Q that represent the rulers of Copan.

Although the Mayan texts referring to the founding of the new Copan dynasty do not include a description of K'uk 'Mo's arrival in the city, there is indirect evidence to suggest that he conquered it militarily. On Altar Q he is depicted as a warrior with typical Teotihuacan "blinders" on his eyes and a serpent-type war shield. When he arrived in Copán, he began the construction of several architectural structures, including a temple in the talud-tablero style very typical of Teotihuacán, and another with recessed corners and moldings that are characteristic of Tikal. These strong ties to the culture of the Maya and that of central Mexico suggest that he was a Teotihuanized Maya, or possibly even a Teotihuacan warrior. The dynasty founded by King K'inich Yax K'uk' Mo' ruled the city for four centuries and includes sixteen kings, plus a probable claimant who would have been seventeenth in the line of succession. Several monuments dedicated to K'inich Yax K'uk 'Mo' and his successor have survived.

=== Successors ===
Next in line was K'inich Popol Hol, son of Yax Kuk Mo, who oversaw the construction of the first version of the Mesoamerican ballcourt in the city, which was decorated with images of the scarlet macaw, a bird which occupies a prominent place in Mayan mythology. He carried out many construction works in the area of his father's palace, now under Structure 10L-16, which he demolished after burying his father there. He built, in rapid succession, three successive buildings on top of the tomb. Successors of Copan were the tradition of its founder, carrying out important constructions and architectural wonders in the city of Copan. One of the most emblematic monuments of this dynastic era was the Rosalila Temple. The stela was also implemented.

== List of kings of the Yax Kuk Mo dynasty ==
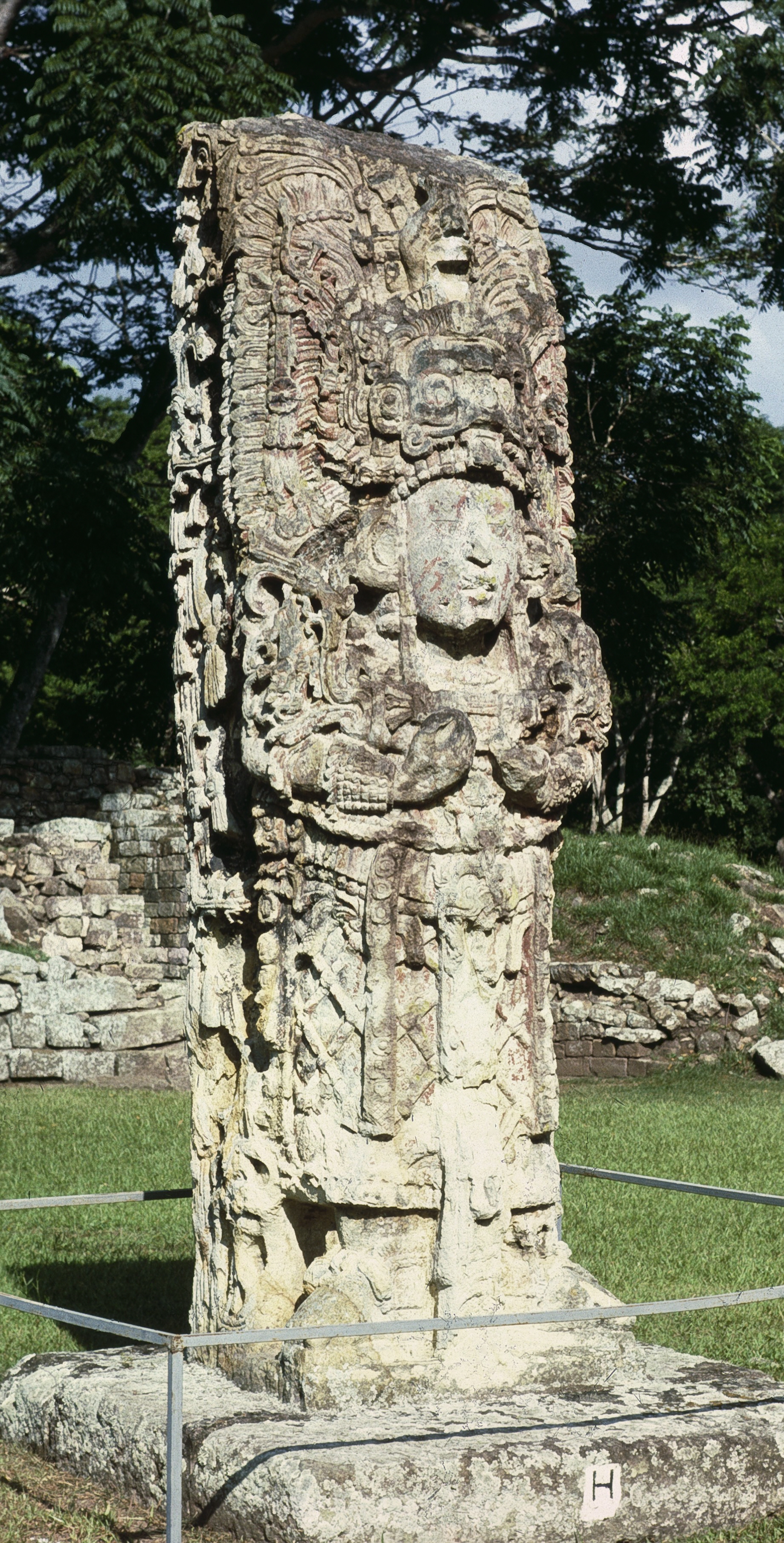
Stele of the ruler Uaxaclajuun Ub'aah K'awiil

The Yax Kuk Mo dynasty ruled the city of Copan for a period of approximately 4 centuries. Its 16 kings ruled from 426 AD. C. until the year 822 d. C. Their registered names are:

1. K'inich Yax K'uk' Mo', 426 – 437; he is the founder of the dynasty that was to rule for almost 400 years. The first king or ruler of Copán was not born in Copán, but came from somewhere in the Maya lowlands (probably from what is now the Petén department of Guatemala).
2. K'inich Popol Hol, c. 437
3. Third king of Copan (name uncertain) c. 455
4. Ku Ix, c. 465
5. Fifth king of Copan (name uncertain) c.476
6. Muyal Jol?, c. 485
7. Balam Nehn, 504 – 544
8. Wi'-Ohl-?, 532 – 551
9. Sak-lu?, 551 – 553
10. Tzi-b'alam, 553 – 578
11. Butz'Chan, 578 – 628
12. Chan Imix K'awiil, 628 – 695
13. Uaxaclajuun Ub'aah K'awiil (18 Rabbit) 711 – 736
14. K'ak' Joplaj Chan K'awiil, 738 – 749
15. K'ak' Yipyaj Chan K'awiil, 749 – 763
16. Yax Pasah or Yax Pasaj or Yax-Pac, 763 – after 810, is the sixteenth and last ruler of Copán. On Altar Q, he is shown receiving the scepter of power from K'inich Yax K'uk 'Mo'. Yax Pasah was the last king of Copán, although there was another pretender called U Cit Took' who tried to take power around the year 822.

== See also ==
- History of Honduras
