= Kʼinich Popol Hol =

- Ajaw
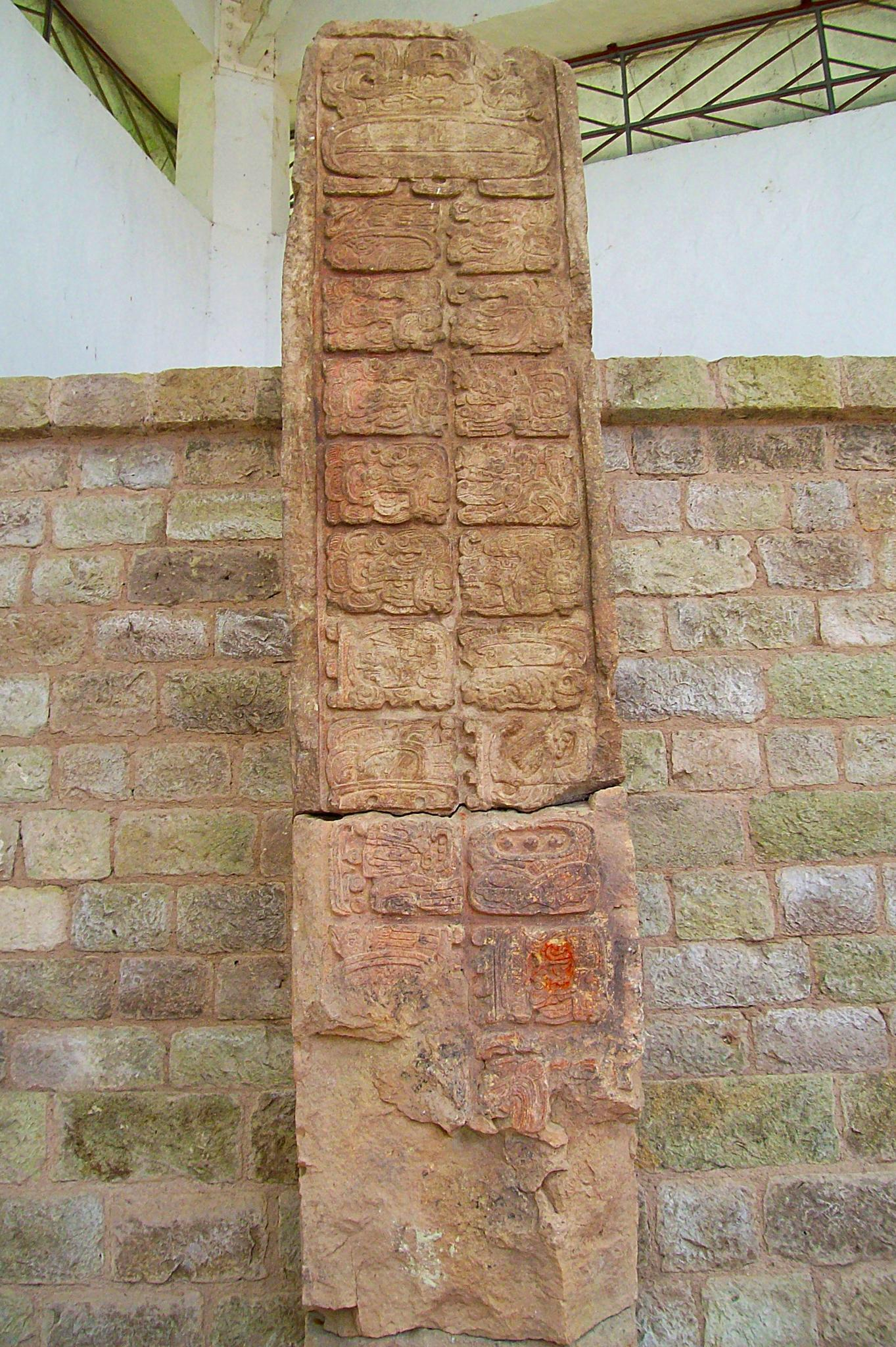

King of Copán
- Reign: c. 435 – c. 470?
- Predecessor: Kʼinich Yax Kʼukʼ Moʼ
- Successor: Ruler 3
- Born: Tikal
- Died: c. 470; Copán
- Issue: Ruler 3
- Father: Kʼinich Yax Kʼukʼ Moʼ
- Religion: Maya religion

Kʼinich Popol Hol also known as Kʼinich II (died 470) was a king of the Maya city of Copán. Popol Hol's main achievement was to cement the mythology and institutions of Central Peten kingship at Copan, which lasted 400 years. He was co-ruler with his father for the baktun (calendrical period) ending rites of December 9, 435 as shown on the Motmot Marker (a structure in Structure 10L-26). He declared himself the son of Kʼinich Yax Kʼukʼ Moʼ on Stela 63 and he claimed succession as the second king of Copan on the Xukpi Stone.

== Works ==
Popol Hol was a major builder. He planned the layout of the Copan acropolis, grand plaza, ballcourt, and temples with his father. He buried his father in the Hunal structure that had been his home and court and built over it the Yehnal temple to honor him. Later he built the Margarita temple over Yehnal. Both were decorated with stucco images of Yax Kuk Mo's name in a determined effort to create a cult of personality and aura of sanctity around his father which he and his progeny would inherit and thus justify their dynastic rule.

Popol Hol also finished the ballcourt and built the Papagayo temple over his father's Motmot temple. He was careful, however, to preserve the Motmot shrine and place stela 63 inside it. In addition to the Motmot Marker, the Xukpi Stone, and stela 63, Popol Hol is responsible for stela 28 and probably stelae 50, 53, and 20 and he appears with his father on stela 35. He also commissioned Altar A' which commemorates the completion of Yehnal in 441.

Popol Hol's body has not been found. Burial 95-1 is a candidate but intriguing excavations are ongoing under the Oropendola temple where another ancient burial has been found.

== Timeline ==
A reasonable timeline for the life of Popol Hol, based on the evidence so far, is:

Years	Event
410-416	Birth
432-434	Motmot burial
430-435	Accession to co-ruler
435	Baktun ending ceremonies with his father
437	Death of Yax Kuk Mo
437	Xukpi stone
437-441	Yehnal constructed
441	Altar A'
443-446	Motmot marker
440-450	Margarita constructed
455	Stela 50
465	Papagayo constructed
465	Stela 63
460-470	Tzapah platform and Chilan constructed
470	Death

== Notes ==
- Andrews, E. Wyllys & Fash, William, eds: Copan: History of an Ancient Maya Kingdom. 2005
- Bell, Ellen et al.: Understanding Early Classic Copan. 2004 Copan Notes #56, 70, 82, 96, 113, 114, 116, 117.
- Morley, Sylvanus: An Introduction to the Study of the Maya Hieroglyphs. 1975.
- Sharer, Robert: Early Copan Acropolis Program 1995-1997.
- Van Cleve, Janice: Who Was Popol Hol? 2014
- Van Cleve, Janice: The Founder - The Life of Yax Kuk Mo, Mover and Shaker in the Maya World. 2013
