= Muyal Jol =

- Ajaw

King of Copán
- Reign: c. 485 – c. 504
- Predecessor: Ruler 5
- Successor: Bʼalam Nehn
- Born: 5th century Copán
- Died: c. 504; Copán
- Issue: Bʼalam Nehn
- Father: Ruler 5
- Religion: Maya religion

Muyal Jol was the sixth ruler of Copan.
