= Ku Ix =

- Ajaw

King of Copán
- Reign: c. 465 – c. 476
- Predecessor: Ruler 3
- Successor: Ruler 5
- Born: 5th century Copán
- Died: c. 476; Copán
- Issue: Ruler 5
- Father: Ruler 3
- Religion: Maya religion

Ku Ix was the fourth dynastic ruler of Copan. Ku Ix built a new phase of Temple 26 at the city, over the Motmot phase, nicknamed Papagayo.
