= Kʼinich Yax Kʼukʼ Moʼ =

Early Mayan ruler of Copan

- Ajaw
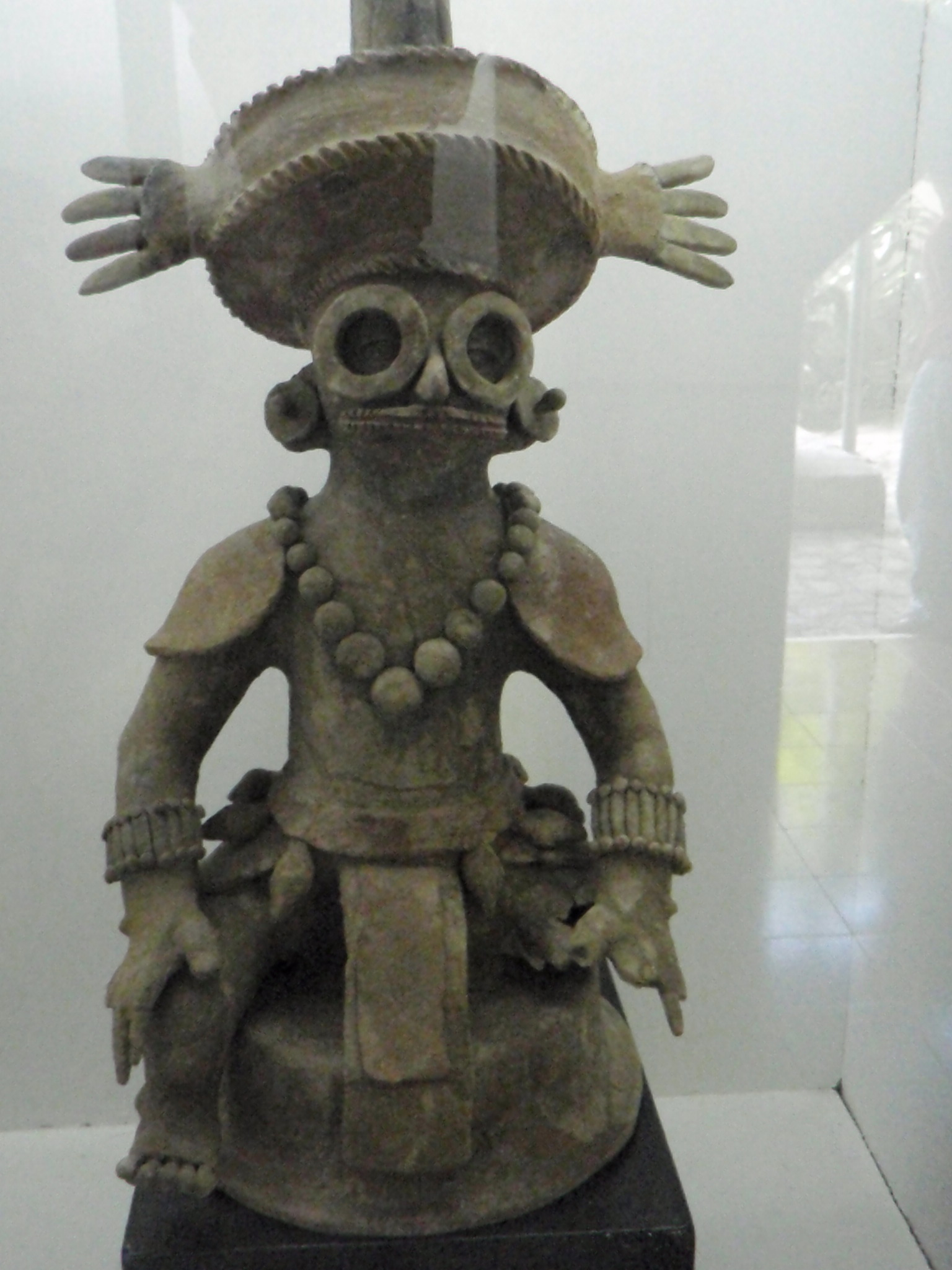
- Incense burner found at the site of Copan and believed to depict Kʼinich Yax Kʼukʼ Mo.

King of Copán
- Reign: 9 February 427 – 437
- Successor: Kʼinich Popol Hol
- Born: Tikal
- Died: 437; Copán
- Issue: Kʼinich Popol Hol
- House: Yax Kuk Mo Dynasty
- Religion: Maya religion

Kʼinich Yax Kʼukʼ Moʼ (Mayan pronunciation: [jaʃ kʼukʼ moʔ] "Great Sun, Quetzal Macaw the First", ruled 426 – c. 437) is named in Maya inscriptions as the founder and first ruler, kʼul ajaw (also rendered kʼul ahau and kʼul ahaw - meaning holy lord), of the pre-Columbian Maya civilization polity centered at Copán, a major Maya site located in the southeastern Maya lowlands region in present-day Honduras. The motifs associated with his depiction on Copán monuments have a distinct resemblance to imagery associated with the height of the Classic-era center of Teotihuacan in the distant northern central Mexican region, and have been interpreted as intending to suggest his origins and association with that prestigious civilization. He is the founder of the Yax Kuk Mo Dynasty of rulers of Copan that lasted until 822 a.C. One of the most commonly cited motifs for this interpretation is the "goggle-eyed" headdress with which Yax Kʼukʼ Moʼ is commonly depicted; this is seemingly an allusion to the northern central Mexican rain deity known as Tlaloc by later peoples, such as the Aztecs. However, modern strontium isotope analysis of the human remains recovered from the tomb attributed to him indicate that Kʼinich Yax Kʼukʼ Moʼ spent his formative years much closer to Copán, at Tikal, and had not himself lived at Teotihuacan.

== Hunal tomb ==
His remains were found in the Hunal tomb inside of Temple 16, in the Copán acropolis; he was buried with jade and shell jewelry, including his 'goggle-eyed' headdress.

== Altar Q ==
His image occupies the first position in the carving on Altar Q, showing the dynasty's king list. His image is also found in significant positions in other monuments of later rulers.

== Analysis of skeleton ==
Archaeological work done at Copán in 2000 excavated the tomb considered to be that of Kʼinich Yax Kʼukʼ Mo under the Acropolis. The skeleton exhibited a number of traumas including healed fractures of the arm, sternum, and shoulder which have been surmised to have resulted from ball court matches. Analysis of strontium in the teeth of the skeleton indicates that the individual spent his early years near Tikal in the Petén Basin region and then at some point between Tikal and Copán, and the isotopic signature did not match with a Teotihuacan origin. Chronologically and epigraphically, however, much evidence points to the general ascension of rulers who were sent into the lowland Maya region either as invaders or envoys from Teotihuacan during the late 4th century; particularly the widely known and powerful Yax Nuun Ayiin I of Tikal, son of Teotihuacan lord Spearthrower Owl. The implication of this, regardless of Kʼinich Yax Kʼukʼ Mo's physical point of geographic origin, is that later Copán rulers, in particular Kʼakʼ Yipyaj Chan Kʼawiil and Yax Pasaj Chan Yopaat retrospectively sought to attribute Teotihuacano heritage to the ʼfoundingʼ ruler of their dynasty as a means of legitimising the dynastic claim. Additionally, epigraphic research published in 2022 demonstrated that Kʼinich Yax Kʼukʼ Mo's dynasty was an offshoot of the Mayan dynasty at Caracol, thereby confirming what was suggested by the strontium analysis.

== Influence over surrounding area ==
Kʼinich Yax Kʼukʼ Moʼ installed Tok Casper upon the throne of Quirigua.
