= Shotridge =

Shotridge is a surname. Notable people with the surname include:

- Florence Shotridge (1882–1917), Alaska Native ethnographer and weaver
- Louis Shotridge (1883 – 1937), Alaska Native ethnologist
