= Louise Baker =

Louise Baker may refer to:

- M. Louise Baker (1872–1962), American archaeological illustrator
- Louise Baker, character in Almost Normal
- Louise Baker, see Custody battle for Anna Mae He
