= Archaeological illustration =

Archaeological illustration is a form of technical illustration that records material derived from an archaeological context graphically.

== Overview ==
Archaeological Illustration encompasses a number of sub disciplines. These are:

- Surveying: To produce an accurate record of sites and buildings and to record accurately where the sites and buildings lie within the landscape. Surveyors use a range of equipment including tapes, plane tables, total stations, 3D scanners, GPS and GIS to produce illustrations including plans, sections and elevations as well as isometric and axonometric illustrations which are regularly used in building recording. Survey data will be gathered on acid free paper, polyvinyl permatrace and archive stable digital formats.
- Photography: To produce a record of archaeological sites, buildings, artifacts and landscapes. Archaeological photographers will uses a range of different formats particularly black-and-white and colour slide. Digital photography is now starting to become more widely used and is especially useful for the recording of historic building. Aerial photography is commonly used as a tool for recording sites and is also used as a prospecting tool to locate new archaeological sites.
- Artefact illustration: To record objects using agreed conventions to allow further study of the objects by specialists on publication. Artefact illustrators will use pen-and-ink as well as graphics and page layout software.
- Interpretation and reconstruction illustration: To visualise the results of archaeological field work in a way that is meaningful and visually appealing to as many as possible. Reconstruction artists work in many media from traditional pen-and-ink and painted reconstruction to more modern techniques including 3D, virtual reality and video.
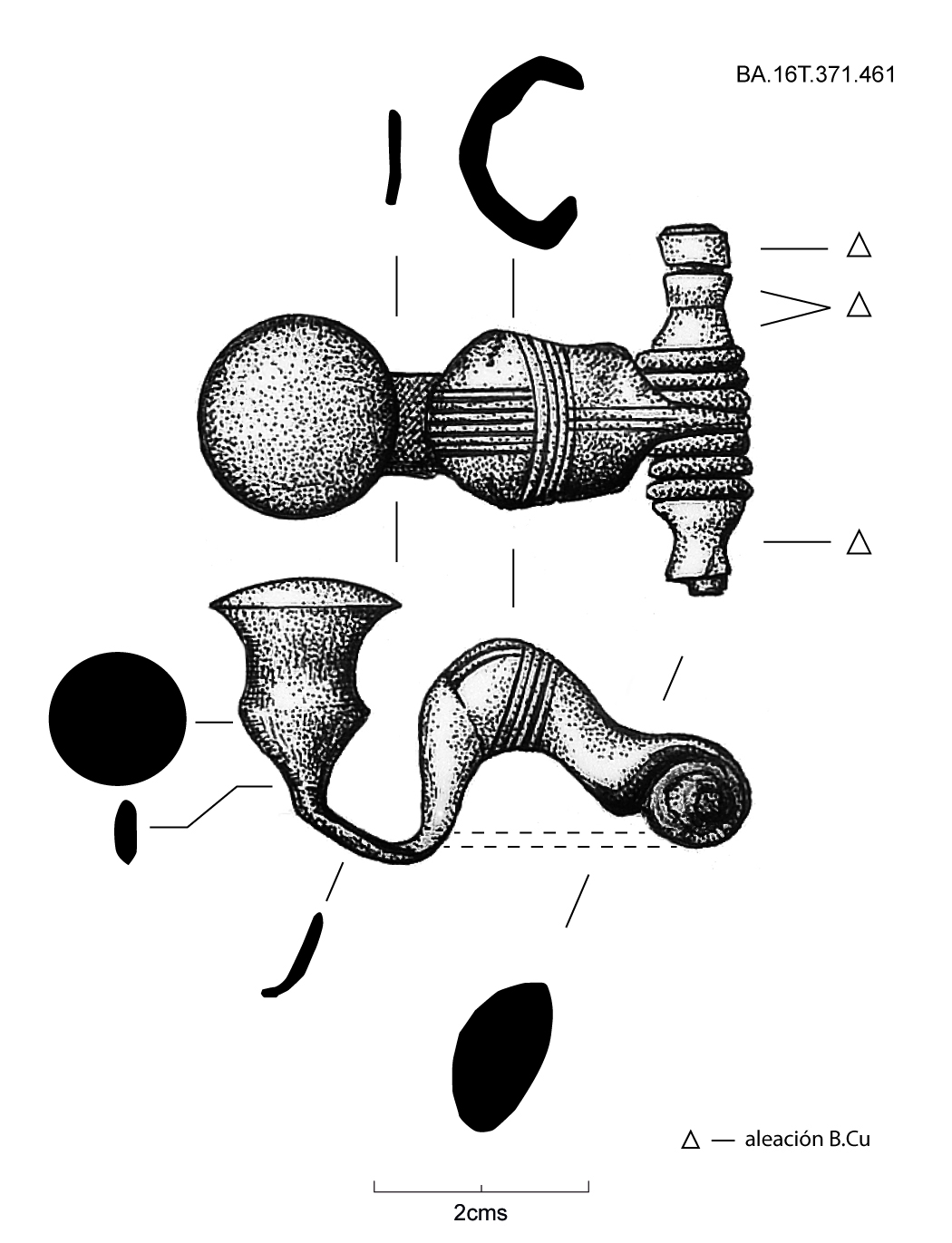
Drawing of a fibula found in an Iron Age setlment in Andoain, Gipuzkoa.

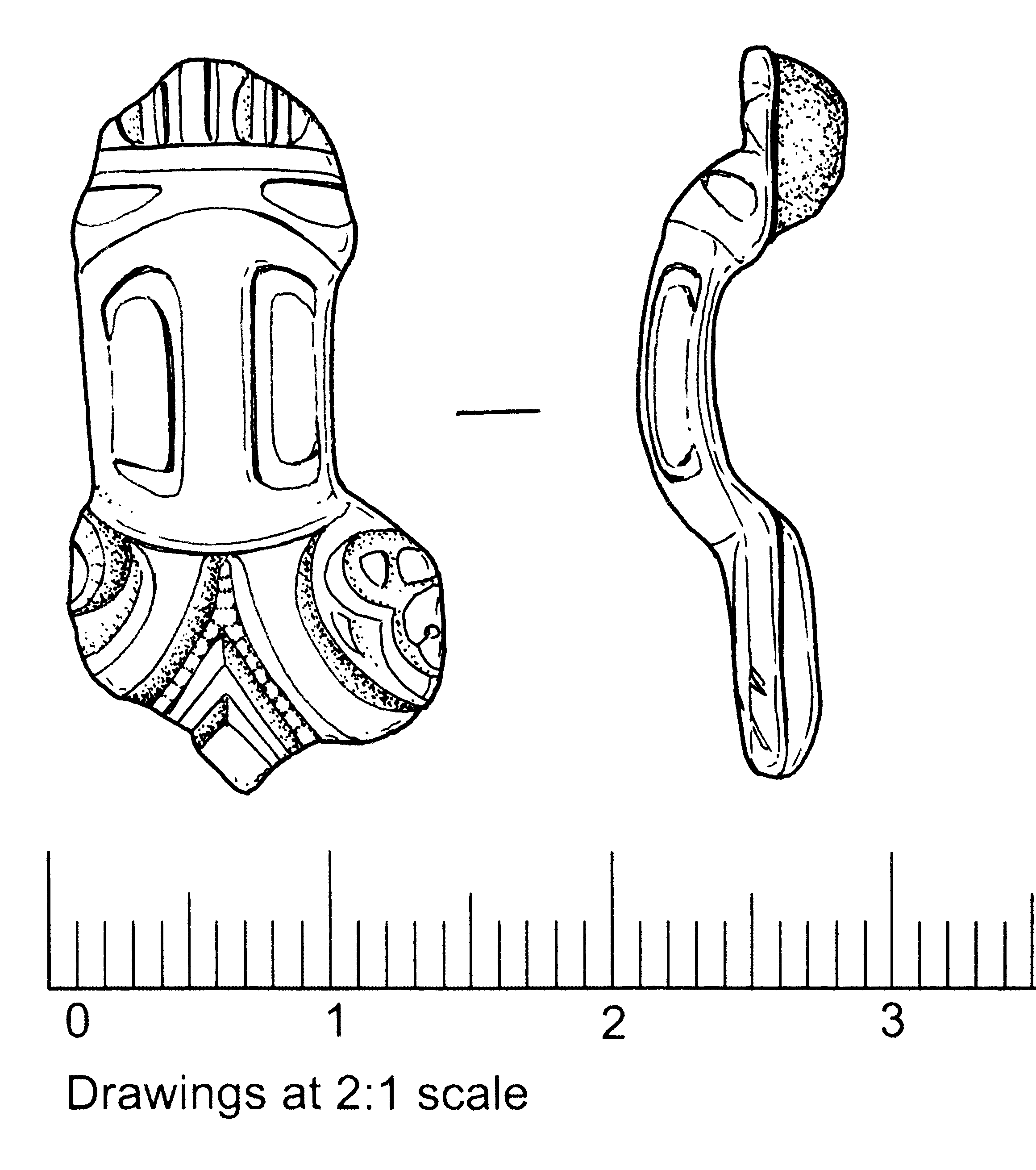
Small Square-Headed brooch of Anglo-Saxon at 2:1 scale

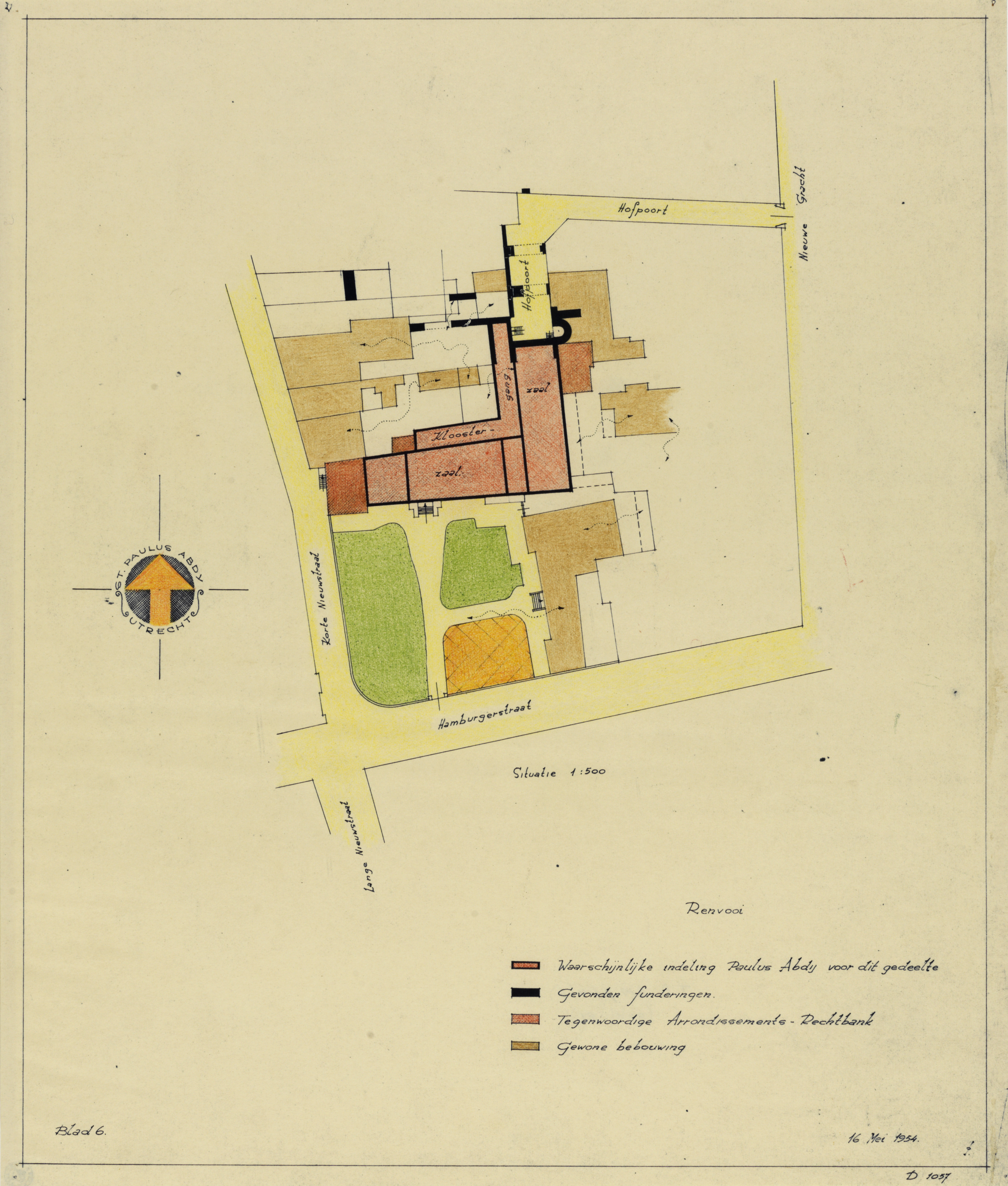
Map of the grounds and buildings of the former St. Paulus Abbey (Hamburgerstraat)

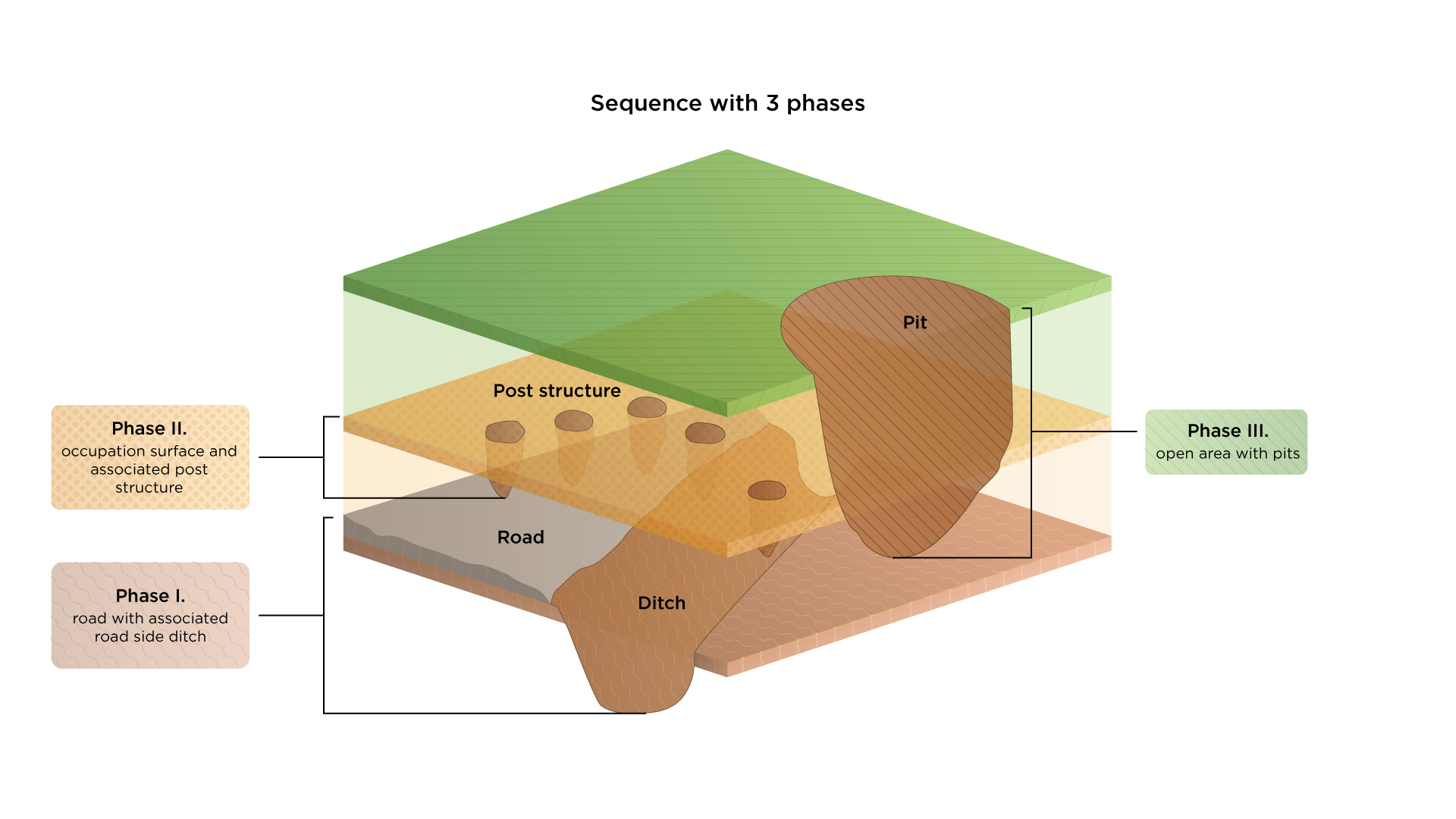
Isometric drawing showing an interpretation with three different phases

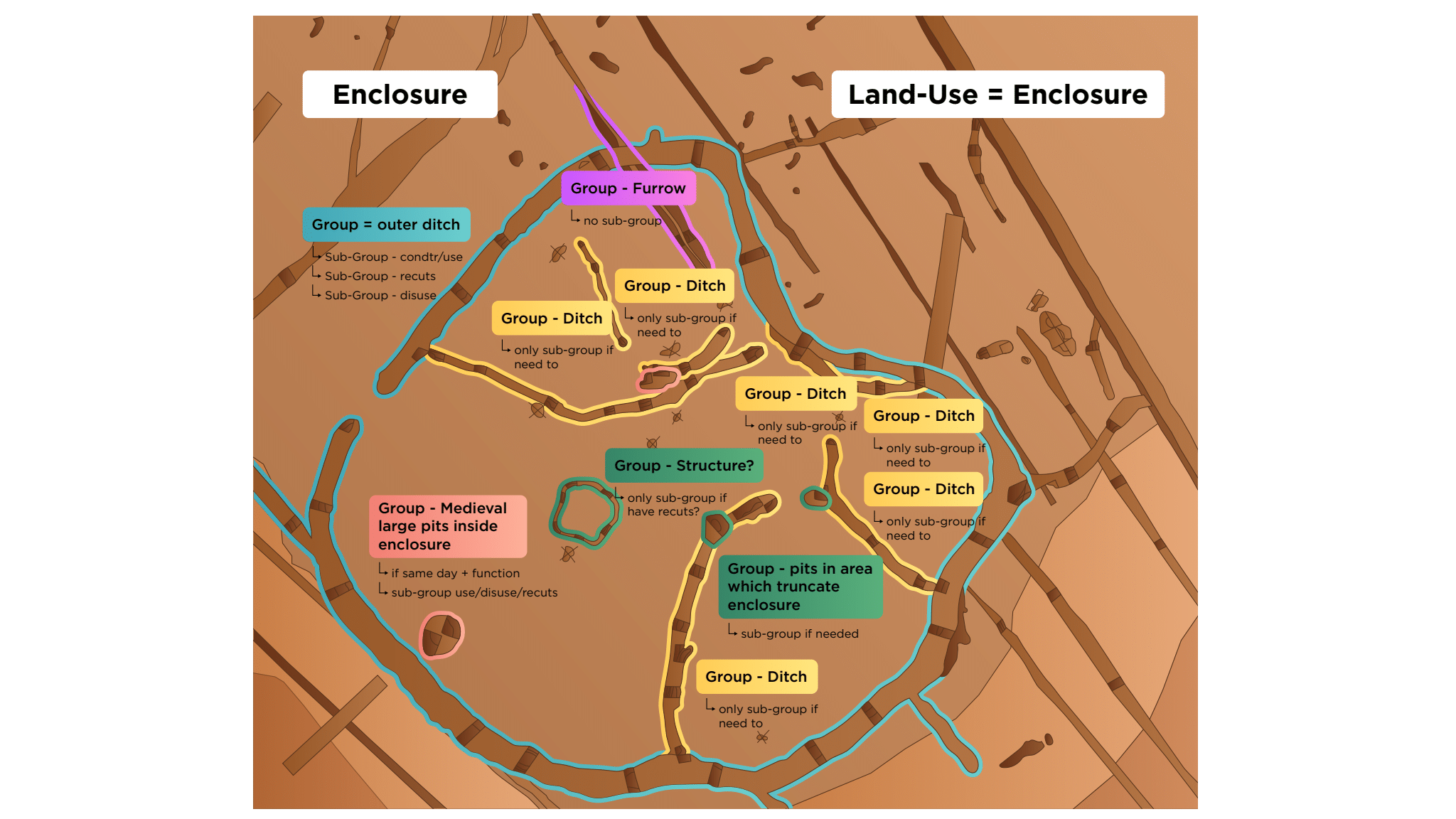
Redrawn version of original sketch plan illustrating grouping and subgrouping within enclosures on the A14 road scheme infrastructure project.

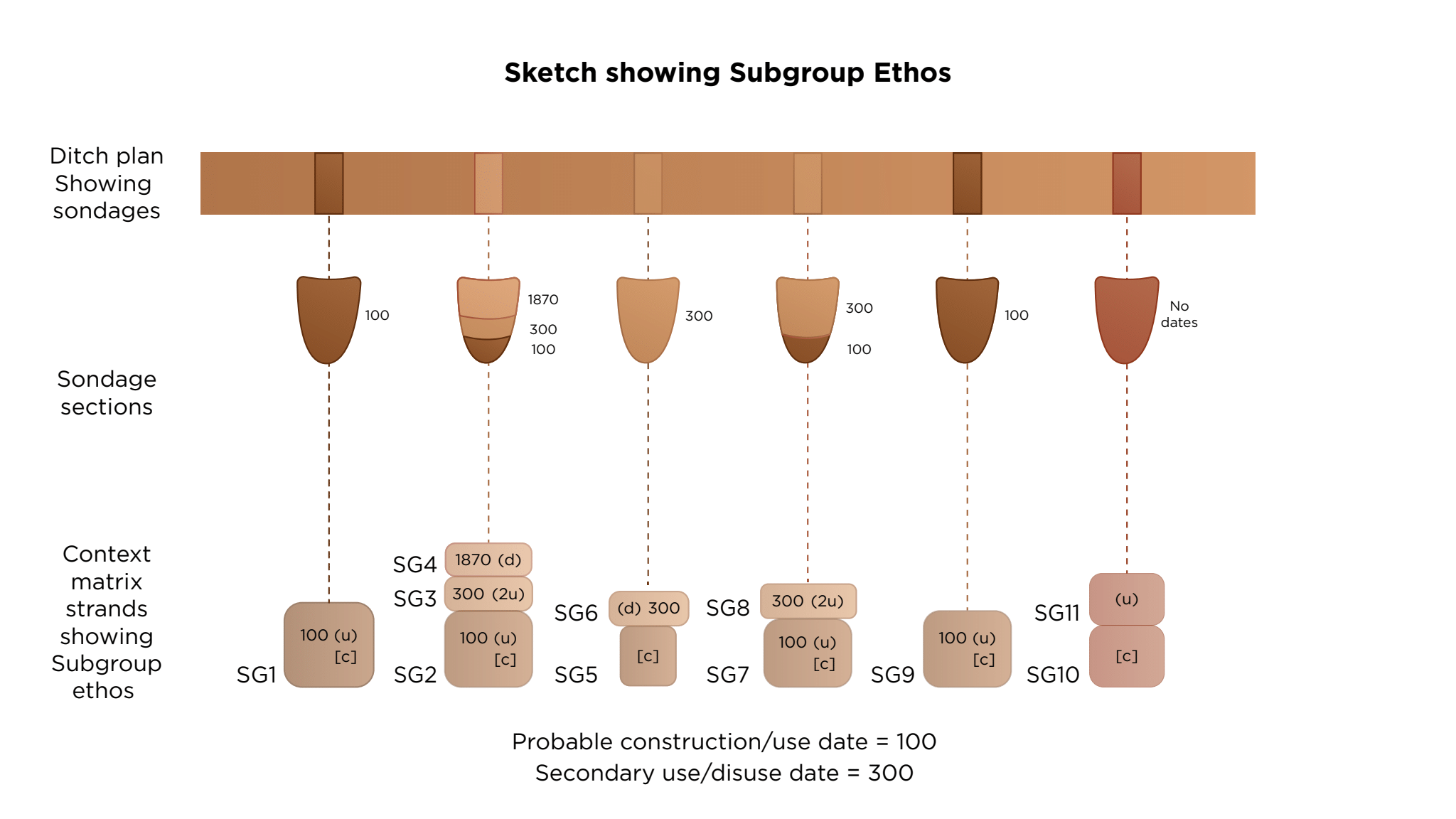
Sketch plan and sections

== See also ==
- Archaeological field survey
- Archaeological plan
- Archaeological record
- Archaeological section
- Excavation (archaeology)
- M. Louise Baker (archaeological illustrator)
- Post excavation
- Training excavation
- Category:Archaeological illustrators
