= Training excavation =

Excavation to teach basics of archaeology

Training excavations for archaeology are normally run by university departments or large contractors and employ professional archaeologists to teach the basics of archaeological methodology, including photography, stratigraphy, illustration and draughtsmanship as well as survey and finds treatment.

The main element of a training excavation is the student or paying volunteer. Often the excavation site is large and rural, and can be worked on over the summer period for several weeks, with many groups arriving over the period for training. Many sites are only excavated due to this type of practice, where development is not pressing for completion and more time can be taken in the long term investigation of the site and training of new archaeologists.

The standard of training on an excavation can be variable, with some sites run by academic archaeologists who are not up to date with current practice.
