= M. Louise Baker =

American archaeological illustrator

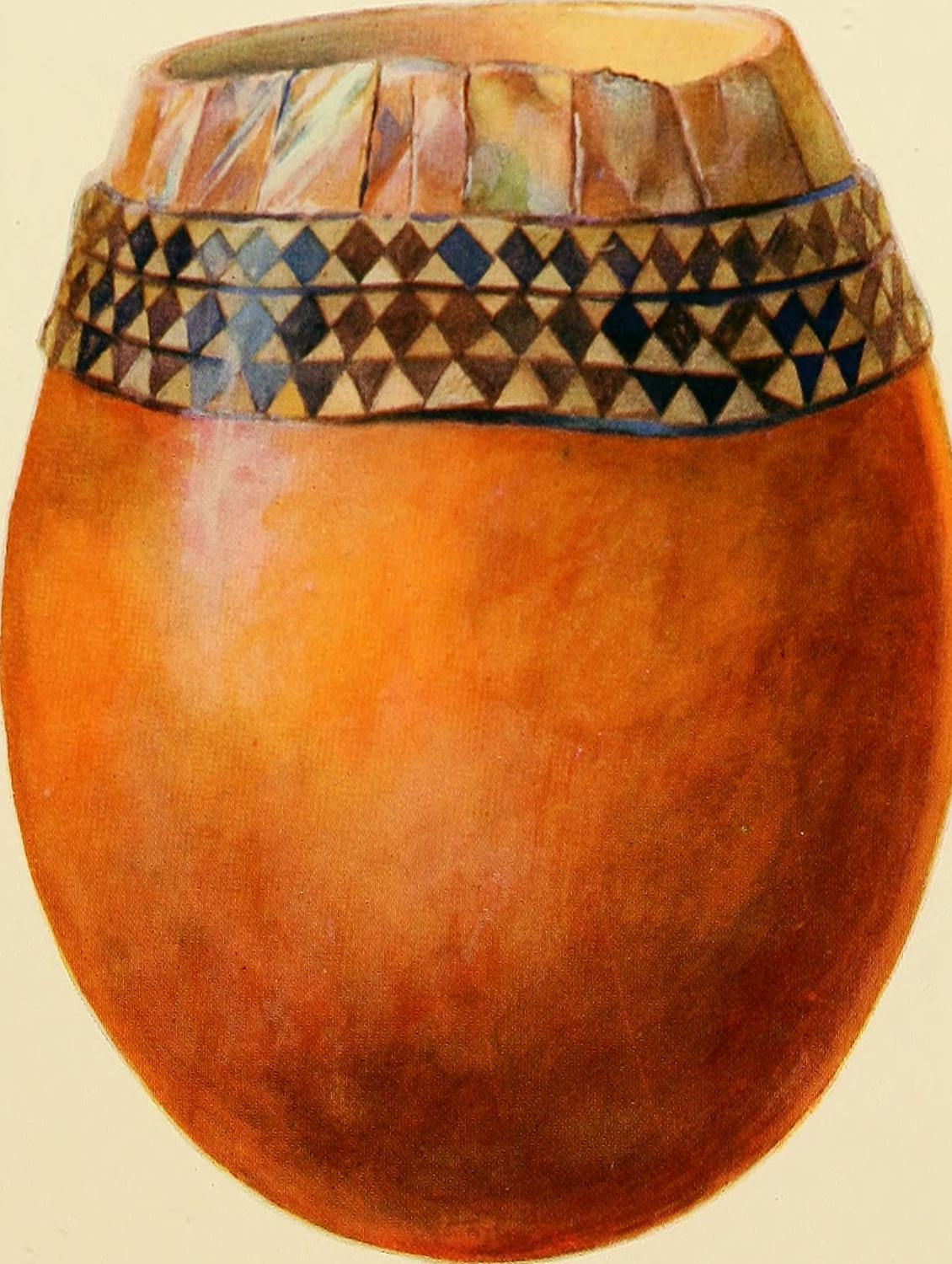
- Ostrich shell with mosaic incrustation, illustration by M. Louis Baker
- Born: Mary Louise Baker; August 4, 1872; Alliance, Ohio
- Died: July 15, 1962 (aged 89); West Chester, Pennsylvania
- Education: Pennsylvania Museum and School of Industrial Art Pennsylvania Academy of the Fine Arts
- Known for: Archaeological Illustrations, children's illustrations, poetry
- Notable work: Maya Pottery in the University of Pennsylvania Museum and in Other Collections (3 volumes)

Mary Louise Baker (1872–1962) was an American archaeological illustrator, resident artist at the University of Pennsylvania Museum of Archaeology and Anthropology (1908-1936), and an art teacher at the George School.

== Education and career ==
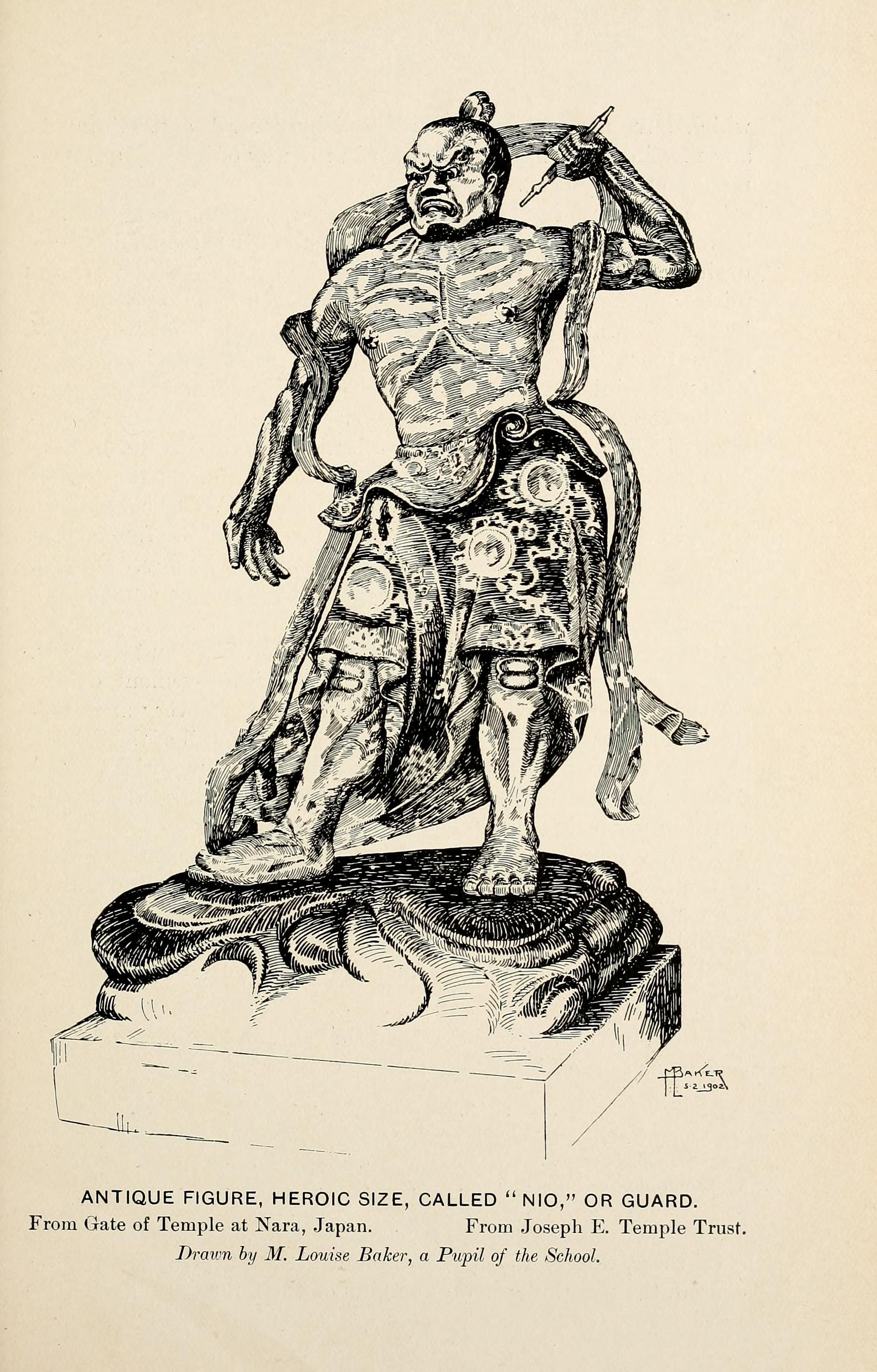
Nio at Nara, 1902, drawn by M. Louise Baker, while a Pupil of the Pennsylvania Museum and School of Industrial Art

Mary Louise Baker was born on August 4, 1872, in Alliance, Ohio. In 1892, at the age of 19, she struck out on her own, first to Chester County, Pennsylvania, where she completed her education and taught primary school, and then on to Philadelphia, where in 1900 she enrolled in the Pennsylvania Museum and School of Industrial Art. She won several awards for her designs and illustrations and was awarded a scholarship. In 1902, M. Louise Baker secured a job from C.B. Moore, restoring pottery and drawing illustrations for his popular "oversized, well-illustrated volumes" published by the Academy of Natural Sciences. (Note: See, for example, Earle, Evan Fay; Davis, Mary B. (2006). "Guide to the Clarence Bloomfield Moore Collection, 1891-1918". cornell.edu. Division of Rare and Manuscript Collections, Cornell University Library. Archived from the original on June 9, 2007., which includes a discussion of Moore's working relationship with Baker and a reprint of H. Newell Wardle's "Clarence Bloomfield Moore (1852-1936)," originally printed in the Bulletin of the Philadelphia Anthropological Society (vol. 9, no. 2, March 1956)) In 1903, she obtained a teaching position at the George School, a Quaker boarding school near Newtown, Bucks County, Pennsylvania. In 1908, she was hired as a part-time illustrator by the archaeologist George Byron Gordon, then the General Curator of American Archaeology, at the University of Pennsylvania Museum of Archaeology and Anthropology, where she worked as the Museum Artist until 1936. She worked as an archaeological illustrator, did illustrations for Museum publications and exhibits, restoration work, and also made models and replicas.

Baker wrote and illustrated stories and poems for children throughout her career, and published illustrations in the Children's Page of the Youth's Companion Magazine and other magazines for children. Baker also led groups of women on summer tours of European museums.

During the First World War, between 1919 and 1920, Baker served with the American Friends Service Committee in France, where she ran an Embroidery Depot for refugees at Verdun and Clermont-en-Argonne, in northeast France near the Belgian border. In August, 1920, she returned to Philadelphia with E. Constance Allen, of Dublin, Ireland. The two had a lifelong relationship and worked together at the George School.

== Major illustrations and travel ==
Before color photography was widely available, archaeologists brought illustrators to the excavation sites to document the paint schemes on vessels, shards, architectural ornaments and murals. Among the field’s most sought-after painters was a rangy, tall, irascible Philadelphian, M. Louise Baker. — Eve M. Kahn, Diaries of M. Louise Baker, The New York Times

M. Louise Baker undertook her first work for the University of Pennsylvania Museum of Archaeology and Anthropology in 1908 on the Museum's Nubian pottery collection. This work was at the request of David Randall-MacIver, who was then the director of the Museum's Nubian expedition. She earned $80 a month. These illustrations were subsequently published in Leonard Woolley and David Randall-MacIver's reports on Karanog, Karanôg: the Romano-Nubian cemetery (1910) and Buhen (1911).

Baker's work at the University of Pennsylvania Museum of Archaeology and Anthropology attracted wider notice, leading many "other ... archaeologists, who had only seen examples of her published work, [to] request... her participation in future efforts." Baker worked in pen and ink, charcoal and watercolor. Her three-dimensional and trompe-l'œil water colors and 'roll out' illustrations of ceramic vessels (Note: This is a technique by which a cylinder is extended, or 'rolled out,' into a flat plane. It is a predecessor to rollout photography. See, for example, the 'roll out' illustrations contained in Moore, Clarence Bloomfield (1903). Certain Aboriginal Mounds of the Florida Central West-coast. Philadelphia: P.C. Stockhausen. ISBN 9781404745056. and Moore, Clarence Bloomfield (1907). Moundville Revisited: Crystal River Revisited. Mounds of the Lower Chattahoochee and Lower Flint Rivers. Notes on the Ten Thousand Islands, Florida. Philadelphia: P.C. Stockhausen.) were particularly admired as "both scientifically valuable and also exquisite art."

=== Mayan ceramics ===
In 1931, M. Louise Baker traveled to New Orleans, where she painted Maya material at Tulane University's Middle American Research Institute. Next she traveled to Mérida, Yucatán, in Mexico, and painted and drew Maya pottery in the State Museum and private collections. Next she traveled to Guatemala City, Guatemala, to make ink and watercolor illustrations of pots from the Carnegie Institution of Washington expedition to Uaxactun and from Cobán, held in the private collection of Erwin Paul Dieseldorff. Her paintings and illustrations of Maya pottery were subsequently published by the University of Pennsylvania Museum between 1925 and 1943 in several volumes of Examples of Maya Pottery in the Museum and Other Collections; several others appeared in the second volume of E.P. Dieseldorff's Kunst und Religion der Mayavölker (1931). Still others have been more recently reproduced.

=== The Royal Tombs of Ur ===
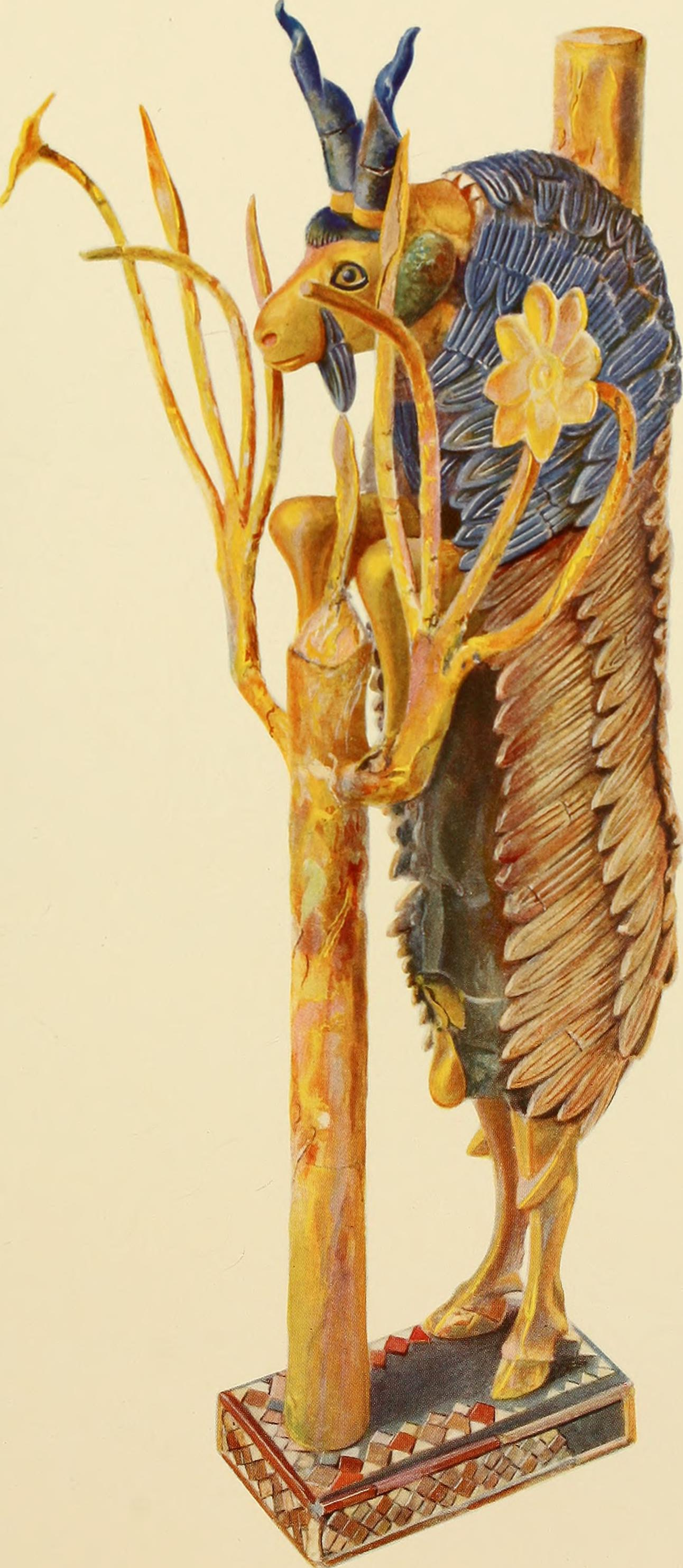
Ram in a Thicket, Ur excavations (1900), drawn by M. Louise Baker

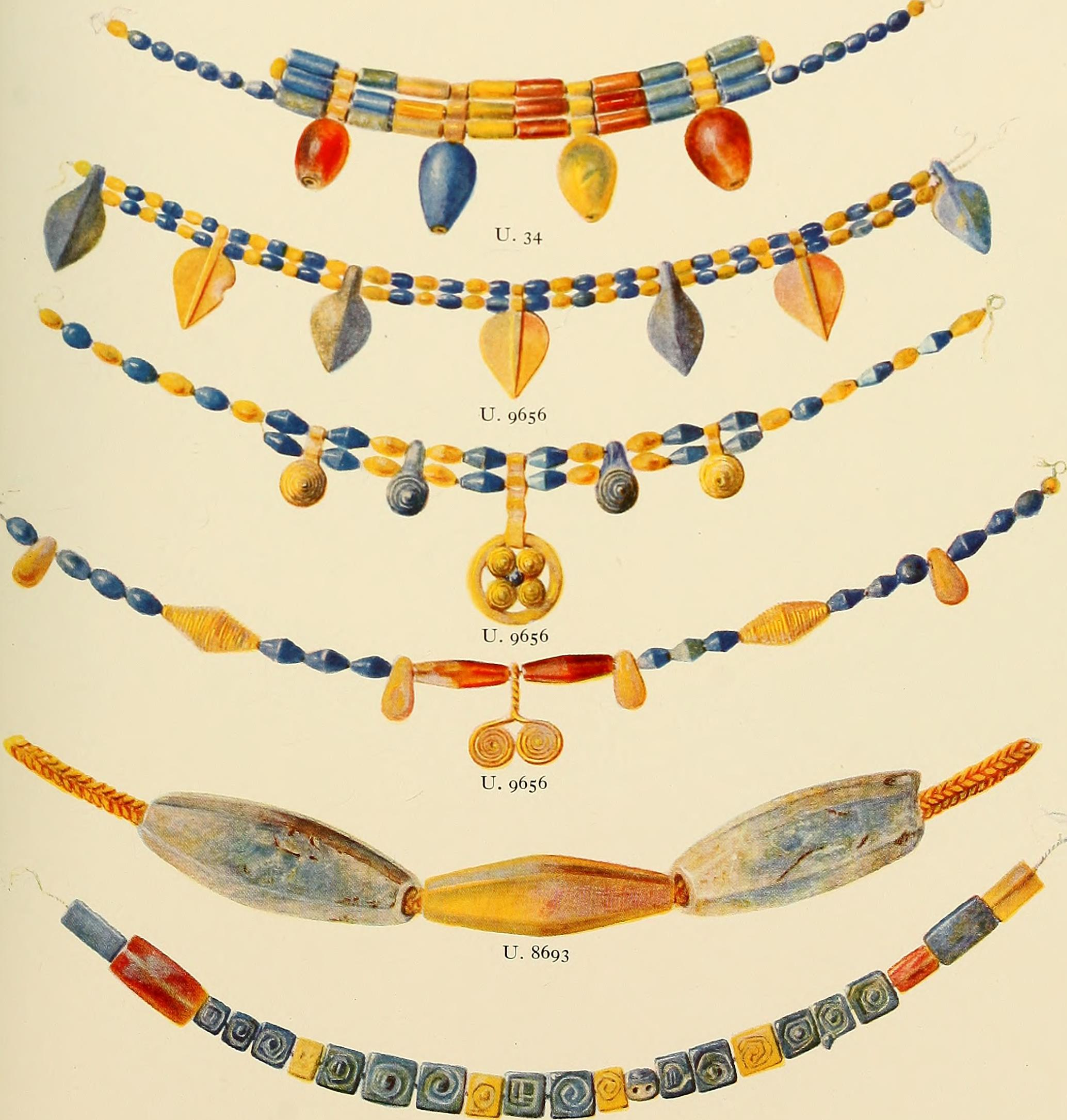
Beads (Chapter 18) Ur excavations (1900), drawn by M. Louise Baker

In 1932, Baker traveled to the British Museum in London, England, and then on to Baghdad, Iraq, to paint materials held there from the Joint Expedition of the Penn Museum and British Museum to Mesopotamia. Leonard Woolley served as the excavation director for the Expedition, which uncovered the Royal Tombs of Ur.

During her return from Iraq, Baker visited museums and private collections in Germany, Spain, France, Sweden, Denmark, the Netherlands, and England to add to her illustrations of Maya ceramics.

== Later life and death ==
M. Louise Baker left the Penn Museum in 1936 when, owing to her failing eyesight, she had difficulty producing illustrations. She retired from the George School two years later, in 1939, together with E. Constance Allen, who was dean there from 1925 to 1938. Baker and Allen purchased a home together in Wallingford, Pennsylvania. For the next ten years, Baker taught classes on writing and illustration, carpentry, furniture making, metal working, and ceramics. She also gave talks on local and Quaker history and her archaeological adventures, acted in amateur theater productions in Chester County, and led tours to European museums.

Baker suffered eye problems ranging from cataracts to glaucoma throughout her life. Doctors hit upon the idea of applying leeches to her temples to alleviate her symptoms.

"The huge leeches were ravenous when released from the box, and quickly fastened themselves to my temples by triangular incisions," she wrote. "In my most successful nightmares, I recall these leeches." — M. Louise Baker, quoted in Crimmins, 2017

She was completely blind by 1949. Baker and E. Constance Allen spent their final years together at The Hickman, a Quaker retirement home in West Chester, Pennsylvania. M. Louise Baker died in her ninetieth year on July 15, 1962.
