= Berenice Venus =

Ancient Cyrenaican Greek marble statue

The Berenice Venus or "The Benghazi Venus" is an ancient Cyrenaican Greek marble statue of the goddess of sexuality and erotic love Venus (150–100 BCE). It was found in Benghazi, Libya, which may have once marked the location of the legendary Lake Tritonis. It is currently located in the Penn Museum in Philadelphia, Pennsylvania.
