= Louis Shotridge =

Native American ethnologist (1883–1937)

Louis Situwuka Shotridge
- Stoowukháa
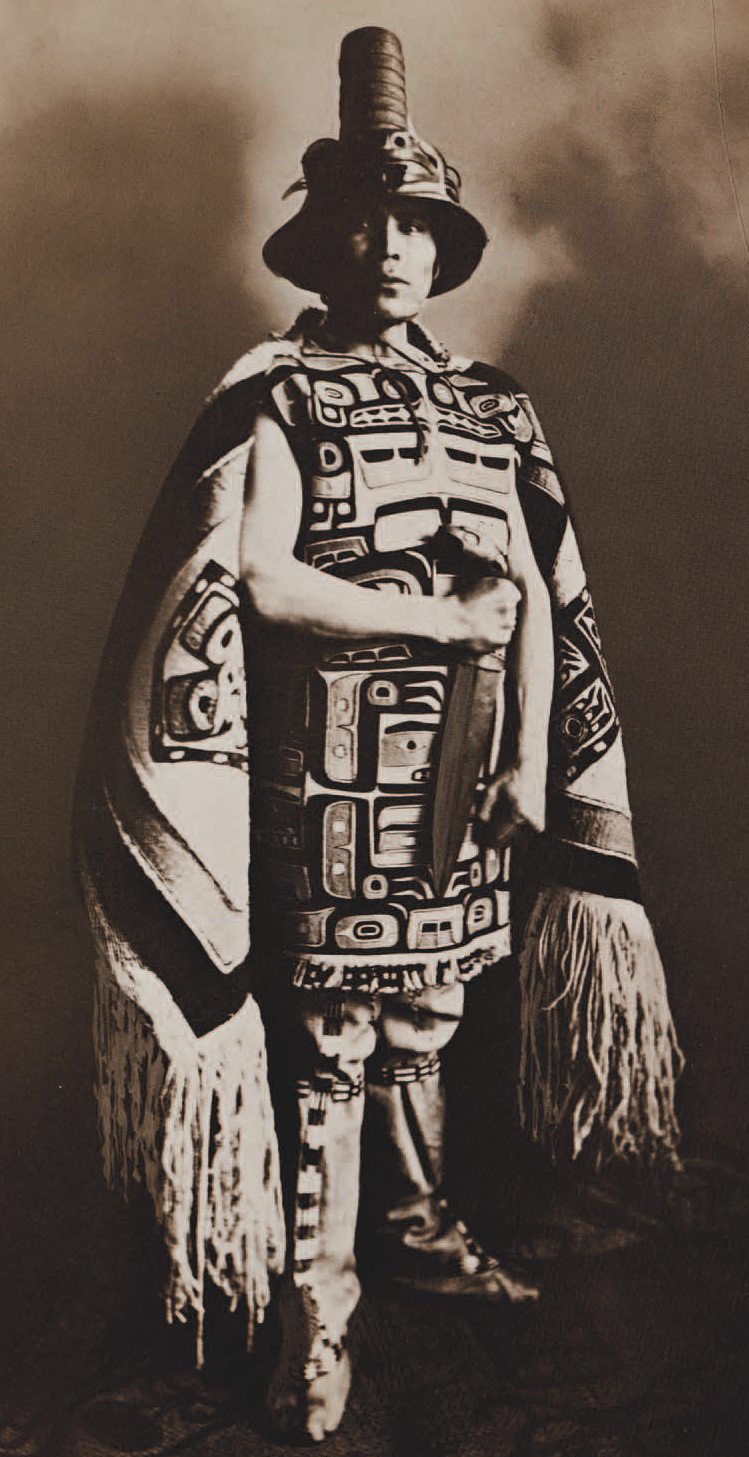
- Shotridge in Tlingit ceremonial dress, c. 1912
- Born: April 15, 1883; Klukwan, Alaska
- Died: August 6, 1937 (aged 54); Sitka, Alaska
- Citizenship: Tlingit
- Occupation: Anthropologist
- Employer: University of Pennsylvania Museum

Louis Situwuka Shotridge (April 15, 1883 – August 6, 1937) was an American art collector and ethnological assistant who was an expert on the traditions of his people, the Tlingit nation of southeastern Alaska. His Tlingit name was Stoowukháa, which means "Astute One."

== Early life ==
Louis Shotridge was born at Klukwan, Alaska, near present-day Haines, in 1883, to George Shotridge (birth name Yeilgooxu, also spelled as Yeil gooxhu) and Kudeit.sáakw. In the Tlingit matrilineal system, Louis followed his mother as a member of the Kaagwaantaan clan in the Eagle moiety and as a member of the Gaaw Hit (Drum House) offshoot called Ligooshi Hit (Finned House). Louis was named after a Presbyterian missionary in Haines named Louis Paul. The name Shotridge is derived from Louis' paternal grandfather Chief "Tschartitsch," this being a Germanicized spelling of the Tlingit name "kakolah" or, in contemporary Tlingit orthography, Shaadbaxhícht.

== Marriage ==
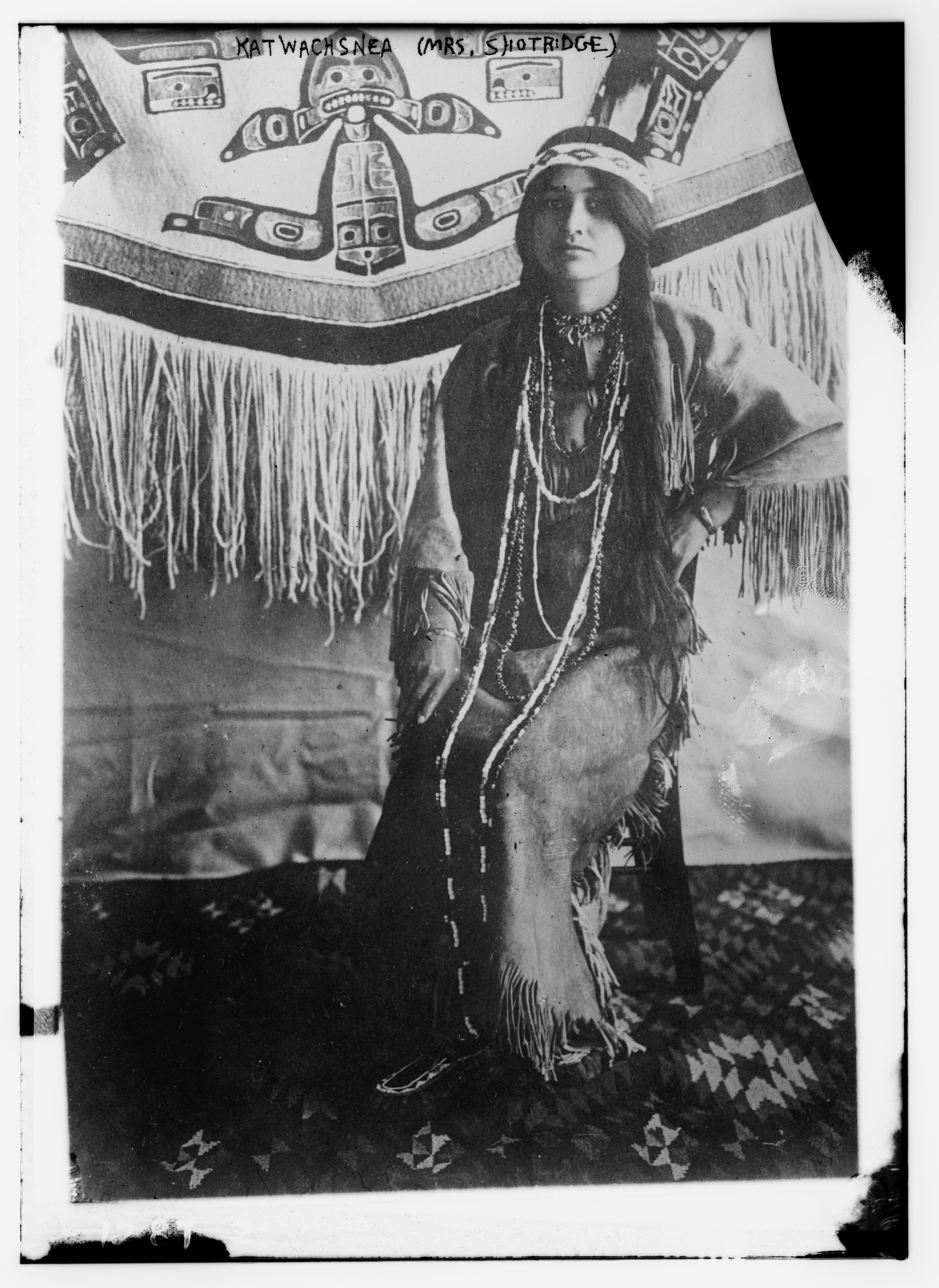
Florence Shotridge (Katwachsnea)

Shotridge was educated at the Haines mission school, where he met his wife-to-be, Florence Dennis (Kaatkwaaxsnéi, also spelled as Katwachsnea), whom he married in a traditional Tlingit arranged marriage; she was of the Lukaax.ádi clan. Florence became an accomplished weaver of baskets and Chilkat blankets and performed her technique at the Lewis and Clark Centennial Exposition in Portland, Oregon, in 1905. Perhaps inspired by contact with the ethnologist Lt. G. T. Emmons, Louis accompanied Florence to Portland to exhibit and sell Tlingit artifacts from Klukwan. Forty-nine were sold to George Byron Gordon of the University of Pennsylvania Museum of Archaeology and Anthropology in Philadelphia, who subsequently hired him to collect more, thus beginning a lifelong career for the Shotridges as artifact collectors, art producers, and culture-brokers.

== Work in anthropology ==
In 1912 the Shotridges visited Philadelphia and met the anthropologist Frank Speck, who introduced them to Canada's leading anthropologist-linguist, Edward Sapir. They began to work with Sapir as well, providing him with essays, information, and objects.

In 1914 the Shotridges met Franz Boas in New York and worked with him on recording information on Tlingit language and musicology. Boas included Louis in his lecture audiences and eventually in his weekly round-table discussions among anthropologists at Columbia University.

Starting in 1915, Shotridge worked for 17 years as Assistant Curator at the University Museum, making him the first Northwest Coast Indian to be employed by a museum.

Louis was also active in the Alaska Native Brotherhood and served as its Grand President.

Florence died on June 12, 1917, of tuberculosis and was buried at Chilkoot, Alaska.

In February 1919 Louis remarried, to Elizabeth Cook, a Tlingit of the L'uknax.ádi clan, and they had three children: Louis Jr., Richard, and Lillian. Elizabeth died in August 1928 of tuberculosis. In the early 1930s Louis married again, to Mary Kasakan (Kaakaltin), a Tlingit of Sitka, Alaska of the Kiks.ádi clan from the family of "Chief Katlean", and had two more children by her.

Shotridge died August 6, 1937, of complications from an accident.
