= Penn Museum =

Archaeological museum

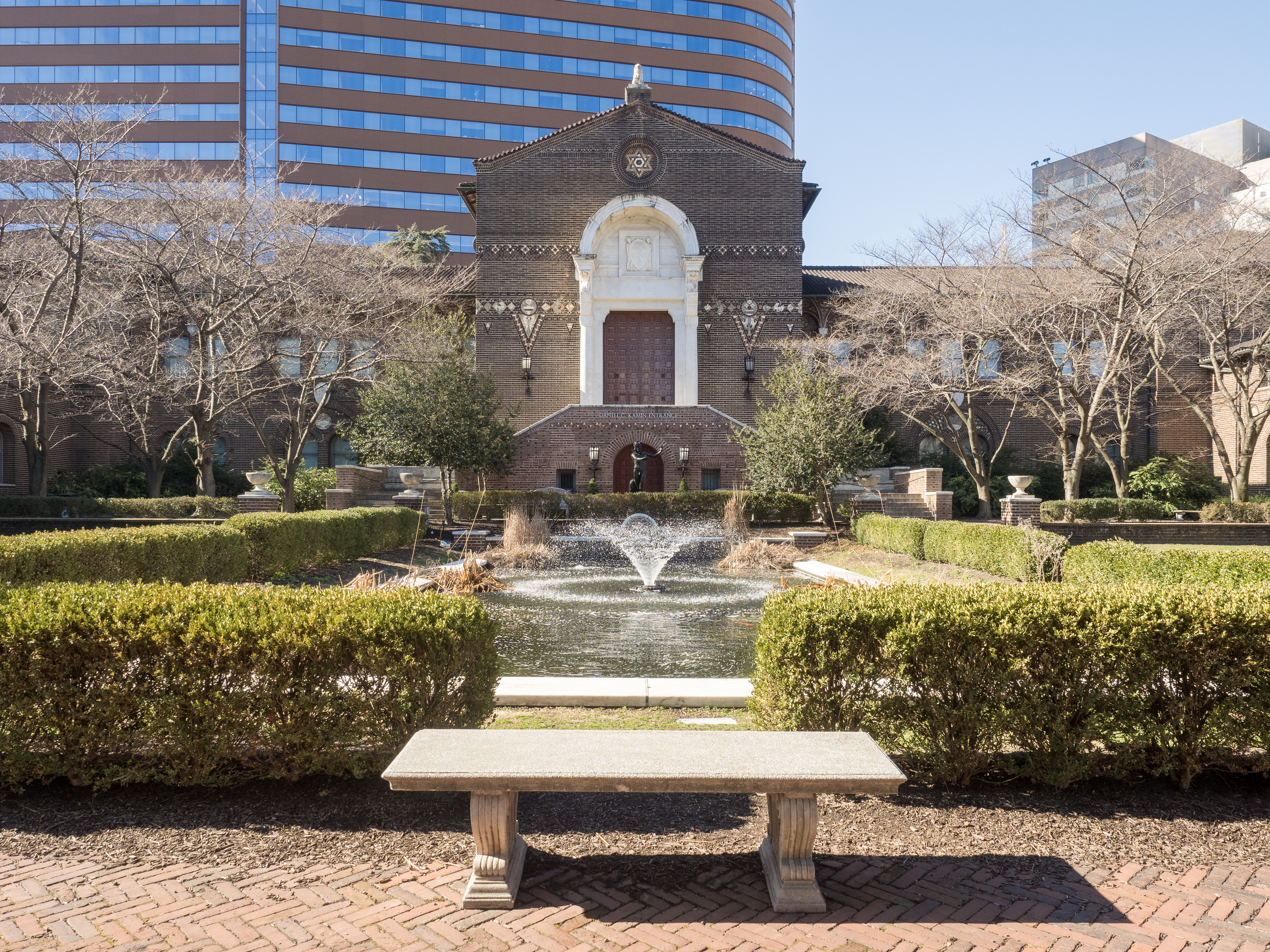
- The Warden Garden and Main Entrance to the Penn Museum
- Established: 1887
- Location: 3260 South Street, Philadelphia, Pennsylvania; United States
- Coordinates: 39.9490°N 75.1911°W
- Type: Anthropology and archaeology
- Director: Dr. Christopher Woods
- Public transit access: Penn Medicine Station: SEPTA Regional Rail; SEPTA bus: 30, 40, 42, 49, LUCY
- Website: penn.museum

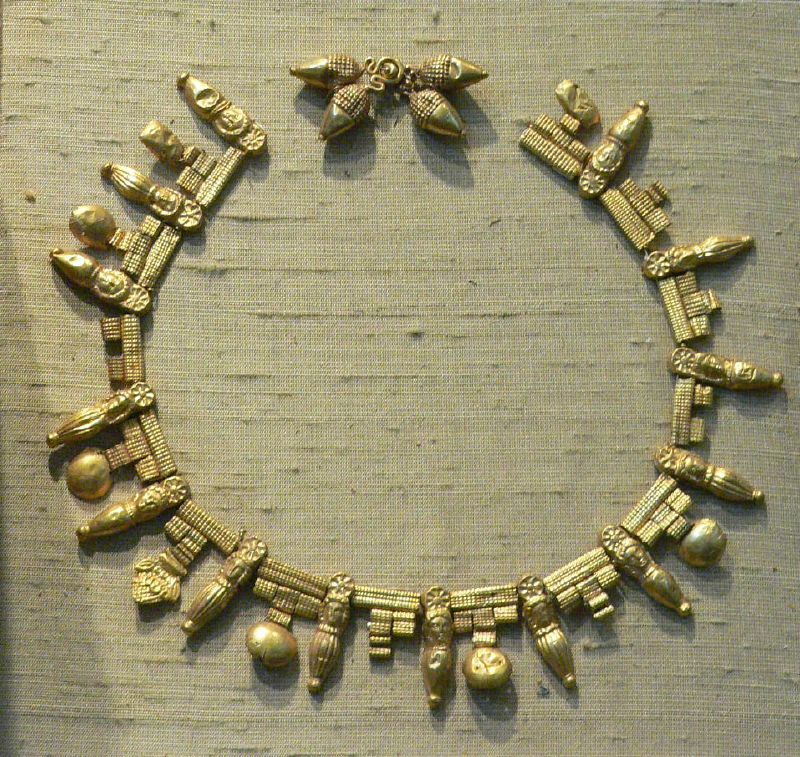
5th-4th century BC Etruscan gold necklace, display at the Penn Museum, 2005.

The University of Pennsylvania Museum of Archaeology and Anthropology, branded as Penn Museum, is a museum at the University of Pennsylvania. It is located on Penn's campus in the University City neighborhood of Philadelphia, at the intersection of 33rd and South Streets. Housing over 1.3 million artifacts, the museum features one of the most comprehensive collections of Middle and Near-Eastern art in the world.

== History ==
Penn Museum was founded in 1887 following a successful archaeological expedition to the ancient site of Nippur in modern-day Iraq (then part of the Ottoman Empire). Provost William Pepper persuaded the trustees of the University of Pennsylvania to erect a fireproof building to house artifacts from the excavation. During the late 19th and early 20th centuries, North American and European museums regularly sponsored such excavations throughout the Mediterranean and Near East, sharing the ownership of their discoveries with the host country. Penn Museum followed this practice in acquiring the vast majority of its collections, and, as a result, most of the museum's objects have a known archaeological context, increasing their value for archaeological and anthropological research and presentation. Since its beginning, the Penn Museum's scientists have conducted more than 300 archaeological and anthropological expeditions around the world.

Today the museum's three floors of gallery space feature materials from the ancient Mediterranean World, Egypt, the Near East, Mesopotamia, East Asia, and Mesoamerica, as well as artifacts from the indigenous peoples of Africa and Native America. Since 1958, the Penn Museum has published Expedition magazine. (ISSN 0014-4738) The excavations and collections of the museum provide resources for student research and the museum hosts the Graduate Group in the Art and Archaeology of the Mediterranean World.

=== 2009 restructuring ===
On November 19, 2008, the Penn Museum's administration terminated 18 Research Specialist positions in archaeological and anthropological research in the Mediterranean world, the Middle East, and Americas sections, effective May 31, 2009. The scientific research center MASCA (Museum Applied Science Center for Archaeology) was also closed, although the MASCA scientists moved to other Sections within the museum. The decision elicited widespread criticism among concerned scholars, who felt that it departed from the Penn Museum's historic mission as a research institution. Museum administrators attributed this measure to the 2008 financial crisis and the deep budget cuts that had resulted at the University of Pennsylvania. The museum's director at the time, Richard Hodges later offered positions as "Associate Curators" or "Research Project Managers" to eleven of the eighteen individuals affected. The museum affirmed its commitment to research, citing more than fifty active research projects spanning five continents that were engaging nearly 200 Museum-affiliated scholars—more than at any other archaeological and anthropological institute or museum in North America could claim at the time.

=== Museum building ===
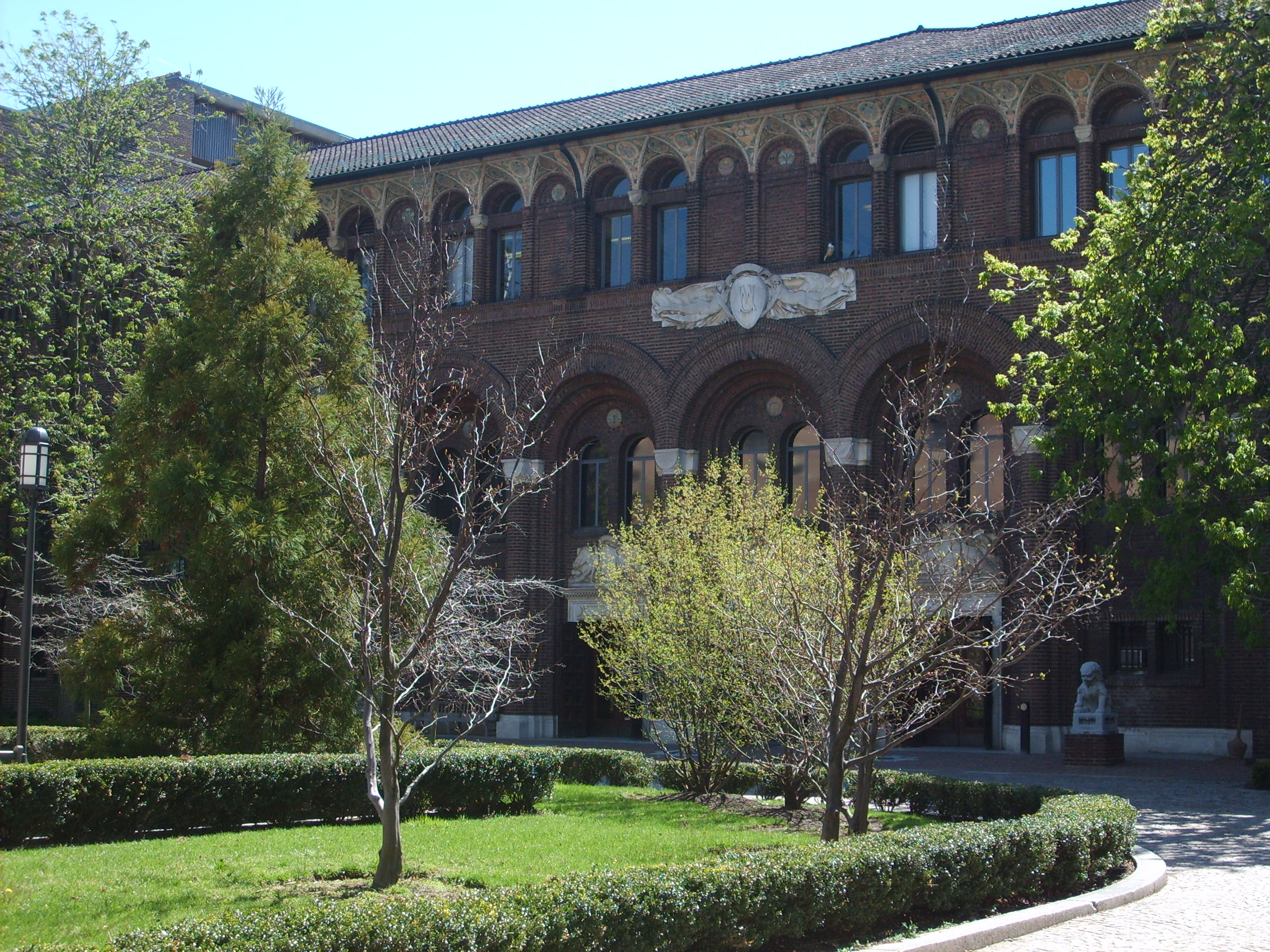
The Stoner Courtyard at the Penn Museum

The museum is housed in an Arts and Crafts and Eclectic style building that is one of the landmarks of the University of Pennsylvania campus. The existing original building (onto which have been grafted several later additions) is actually only approximately one-third of an ambitious design that would have created one of the largest museum buildings in the United States. Features of the extant building include a dramatic rotunda, multiple courtyards and gardens, a fountain, reflecting pool, glass mosaics, iron gates, and stone statuary. Penn Museum was designed by a team of Philadelphia architects, all of whom taught on the faculty of the university: Wilson Eyre, Cope & Stewardson and Frank Miles Day. The first phase was completed in 1899 and housed the discoveries from an expedition sponsored by the university to the ancient site of Nippur. The rotunda, which houses the Harrison Auditorium, was completed in 1915. Charles Klauder designed the Coxe Memorial Wing, which opened in 1926 to house the museum's Egyptian collection. The Sharpe Wing was completed in 1929.

The Coxe Memorial Egyptian Wing was added to the museum in 1924 through a bequest by former museum board president Eckley Coxe. The administrative wing was added in 1929. The Academic Wing, which provided laboratories for the Anthropology department and classrooms was opened in 1971. The most recent major addition was made in 2002, with the addition of the Mainwaring (Collections Storage) Wing.

== Museum Library ==
The Museum Library was established in 1900 when the personal library of University of Pennsylvania professor of American archaeology and linguistics Daniel Garrison Brinton was acquired. This library contained an estimated 4,098 volumes of which the ethnology and linguistics of the American Indigenous peoples were the primary disciplines. This library also consists of a manuscript collection of nearly two hundred volumes relevant to the study of autochthonous Central American languages; most of which are either severely endangered or have completely disappeared. The original location of the library holdings was the Furness Building until they were transferred to the museum building in 1898. They were relocated to the Elkins Library up until 1971 upon when they were moved to their final home in the university extension of the museum.

Prior to its move in 1971 the collection was built upon the support of museum curators contributing their personal monographs, negotiations with affiliate institutions here and abroad as well as endowments by philanthropic individuals.

The library collection was maintained by a staff comprising a single part-time librarian until 1942 when Cynthia Griffin became the first full-time librarian. It was under Griffin that the collection and library witnessed many developments. Prior to her arrival use of the library had been limited to employees of the museum and university professor; however, Griffin extended the accessibility to include students. She also augmented communication networks between the library and libraries worldwide. Within twenty years the library's collection more than doubled its capacity from nearly 20,000 volumes in 1945 to over 46,000 volumes in 1965, and by 1971 the breadth of the collection was well over 50,000 volumes increasing by 14,000 volumes annually.

The range of disciplines featured in the collection is specific to the museum itself and incorporates all divisions of anthropology and archaeology. There is a special emphasis on works published within the field of Mesoamerican archaeology as well as works which relate to the current research of the university's professors. As of 2008 there are approximately 115,000 volumes in the library's collection, 14,000 of these volumes have been circulated on an annual basis. The library also has subscriptions to an estimated 549 scholarly journals. Computing services within the library include desktop and laptop computers. Other services encompass a range of printing and scanning utilities as well as accommodating seating for 154 individuals. The library supports two quiet rooms for patron study, a space to examine photographs, a room designed specifically for microform research, and a collection of audio and video materials.

== Collections ==
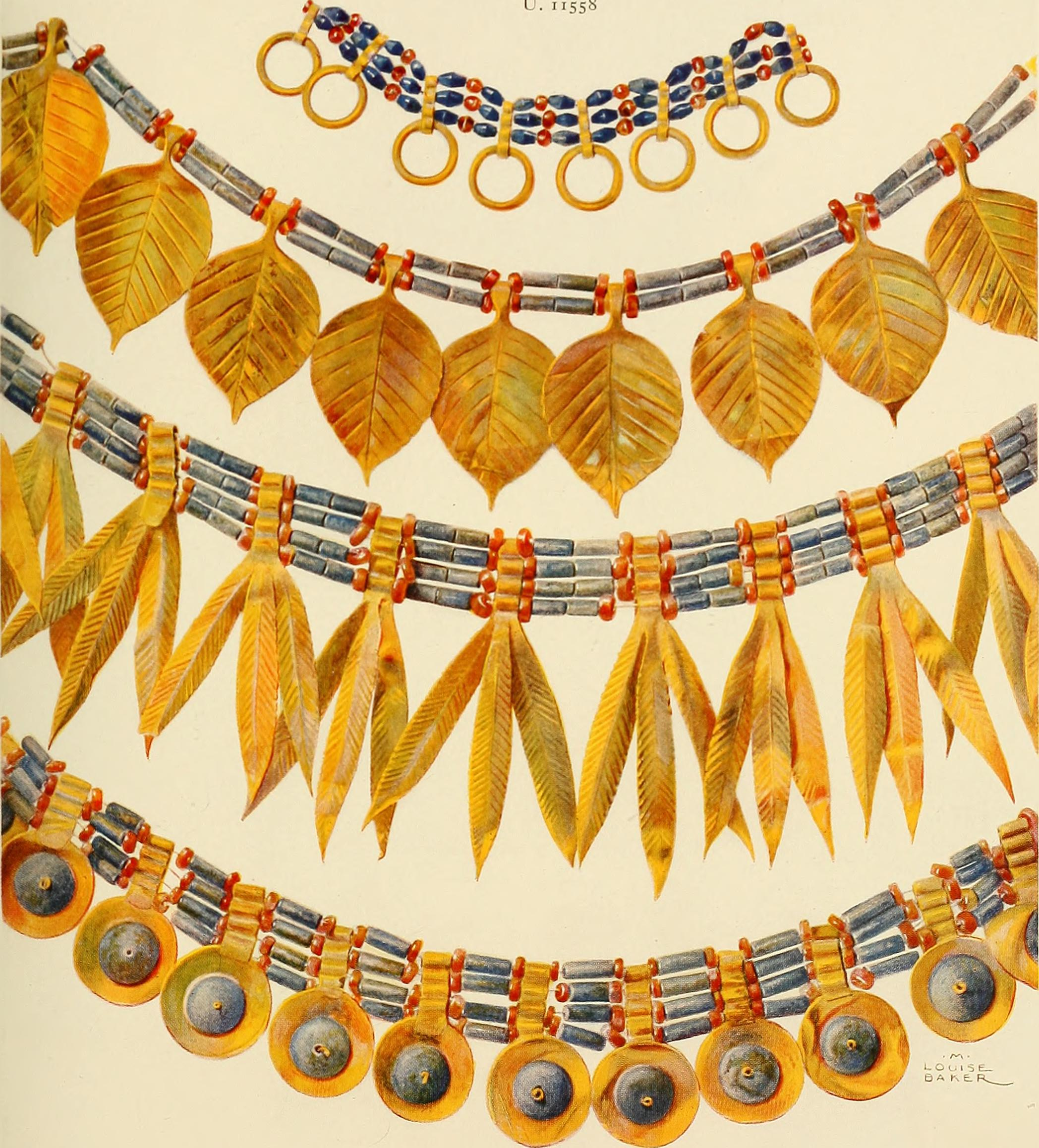
Head-dress of a noblewoman buried at Ur, from the report on the Joint Expedition of the British Museum and of the Penn Museum, 1900. Illustration by M. Louise Baker.

Penn Museum's extensive collections fall into three main divisions: archaeology, the artifacts recovered from the past by excavation, ethnology, the objects and ideas collected from living peoples, and physical anthropology, the physical remains of humans and nonhuman primates. For curation and display, the items in the archaeology and ethnology collections are organized by geographic regions. As of 2023, there are eleven permanent galleries: Africa, Asia, Egypt, Sphinx, Middle East, Eastern Mediterranean, Etruscan, Greece, Rome, Native American Voices and Mexico and Central America. The collections are organized along similar lines, but with larger geographic groupings for some regions. Collection areas include Africa, America (North, Central and South), Asia, Egypt, Europe (Etruscan, Greece and Rome), Mediterranean, Near East and Oceania. Many items within these collections are not on display in the permanent galleries, but may be used for research and temporary exhibits. None of the items in the physical anthropology collections are on display, but they are used for research.

=== Ethnology and Archaeology Collections ===
==== Africa ====
Penn Museum has one of the largest collections of African ethnographic and archaeological objects in the country. Mostly obtained from 1891 to 1937, the collection contains objects from all regions of Africa, but with a concentration from the Democratic Republic of the Congo, Gabon, Angola, Morocco, Sierra Leone, Ivory Coast, Senegal, Nigeria, Kenya, Tanzania, Ethiopia, South Africa, Namibia, Botswana and Madagascar.

The museum has about 196 artifacts from the punitive Benin Expedition of 1897, including notably the Benin Bronzes, procured directly from British forces who had partaken in the expedition. The bronzes were restored after suffering damage in the nineteenth and twentieth centuries. The museum has indicated that it's openness to deaccession and repatriate them.

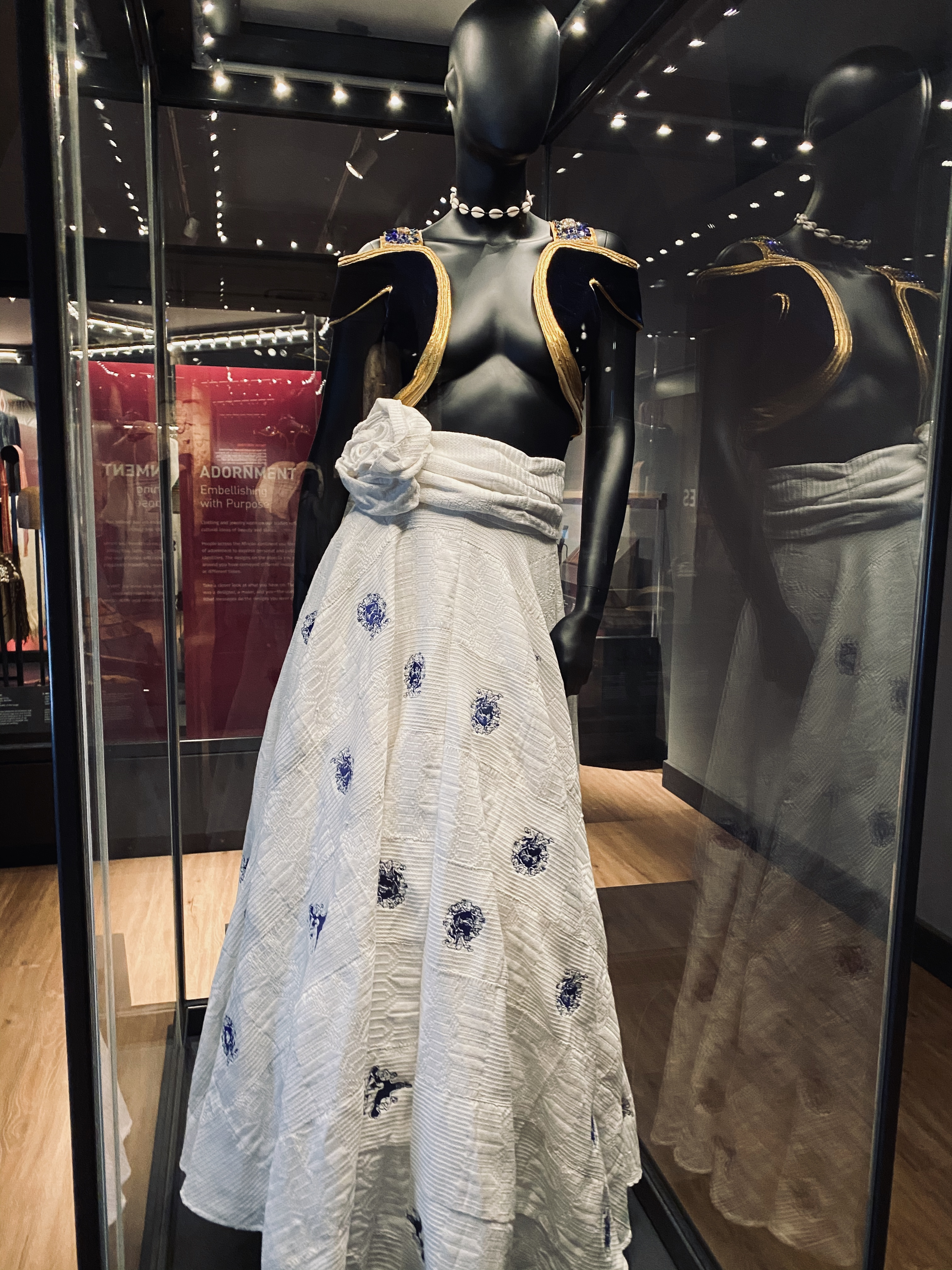
"Wearable Literature", designed by Breanna Moore and Emerson Ruffin, debuted in the Penn Museum on November 16, 2019.

Penn Museum has one of the most extensive Sherbro Island collections in the world. During a museum sponsored expedition in 1936–1937, Curator of General Ethnology, Henry Usher Hall spent seven months conducting ethnographic research among the Sherbro people of Sierra Leone. The collection consists of textiles, sculpture, artifacts related to subsistence and household items, secret society and examples of medicine bundles. Hall's papers include field notes, bibliographies, and textual commentaries that provide ethnographic information about the way of life of the Sherbro people and others—including the Mende, Krim, and Temne peoples—who lived among them.

The Central African collection includes approximately 3000 artifacts from the Democratic Republic of Congo (formerly the Belgian Congo). The majority of these artifacts were collected by the German ethnographer Leo Viktor Frobenius on his expedition to the Kasai district of the Congo in 1906. His collection illustrates the diverse sculptural forms found among the different cultural groups in the Central African region. Some of the cultures represented in the collection are the Kuba, Kongo, Luba, Suku, Yaka, Pende, Teke, Chokwe, and Luluwa. One of the lesser known collection within the African Section is the Moroccan collection. Dr. and Mrs. Talcott Williams travelled to Morocco in 1898 and returned with approximately 600 objects to document the cultures in Morocco. The collection consists of clothing, shoes, rugs, blankets, weapons, jewelry, pottery, baskets, cooking pots. This thorough collection of objects representing daily life was well documented by Dr. Williams who also collected on behalf of the Smithsonian.

On November 16, 2019, the Penn Museum debuted a newly renovated African gallery alongside many other new galleries and rooms. Penn professor of Sociology and Africana Studies, Dr. Tufuku Zuberi, was appointed as the head curator for the new Africa exhibit, and approached his former student Breanna Moore about designing a new dress for the gallery. Moore enlisted the help of her friend and Philadelphia artist, Emerson Ruffin, to create the dress titled “Wearable Literature”, now a popular item in the Penn Museum's African galleries.

==== North America ====
The North American archaeological collections contain heritage items from twenty thousand years old to a few hundred years old. In the 1960s, these were arranged chronologically. Some of these items were excavated in the late 19th century and early 20th century, while others were purchased or donated by reputable collectors. In 1896, Frank Hamilton Cushing excavated wolf, deer and human masquettes that he found in the waters off of Key Marco, Florida. The masquettes were unfortunately distorted upon removal from the water, but they and the numerous tools and practical items had an unusually high level of preservation due to their underwater location. In the interwar years, Edgar B. Howard excavated some of the oldest items in the collection from the American Southwest. His excavations in 1932 and 1933 near Clovis, New Mexico, are significant in identifying the Clovis Point, and in proving the co-existence of humans and extinct animals such as the bison and mammoth.

The North American ethnographic holdings number approximately 40,000 heritage items attributed to approximately 200 Indigenous nations and organized within eleven geographic regions (Arctic, Sub-Arctic, Northwest Coast, Plateau, California, Great Basin, Southwest, Great Plains, Southeast and Northeast). The strongest collections are those systematically created via ethnographic collecting expeditions in Alaska, the Northwest Coast, Southwest, Southeast, and Sub-arctic regions. Many of the Northwest Coast materials were collected in the early 20th century by Louis Shotridge, the son of an influential Tlingit chiefly family. Penn Museum director George Byron Gordon hired Shotridge as a curator. He worked for the museum in various capacities between 1912 and 1932, including multiple field expeditions sponsored by John Wanamaker. Prominent ethnographers of the time also contributed to the North American collections. As a professor and chair of the anthropology department at the University of Pennsylvania, Frank Gouldsmith Speck was one of the most prolific donors to the museum's Sub-Arctic ethnology collections. In addition, Speck was an early adopter of audio recording technology with which he gathered examples of Creek and Yuchi songs. Individual donations significantly contribute to the collections in many areas.

==== Mexico and Central America ====
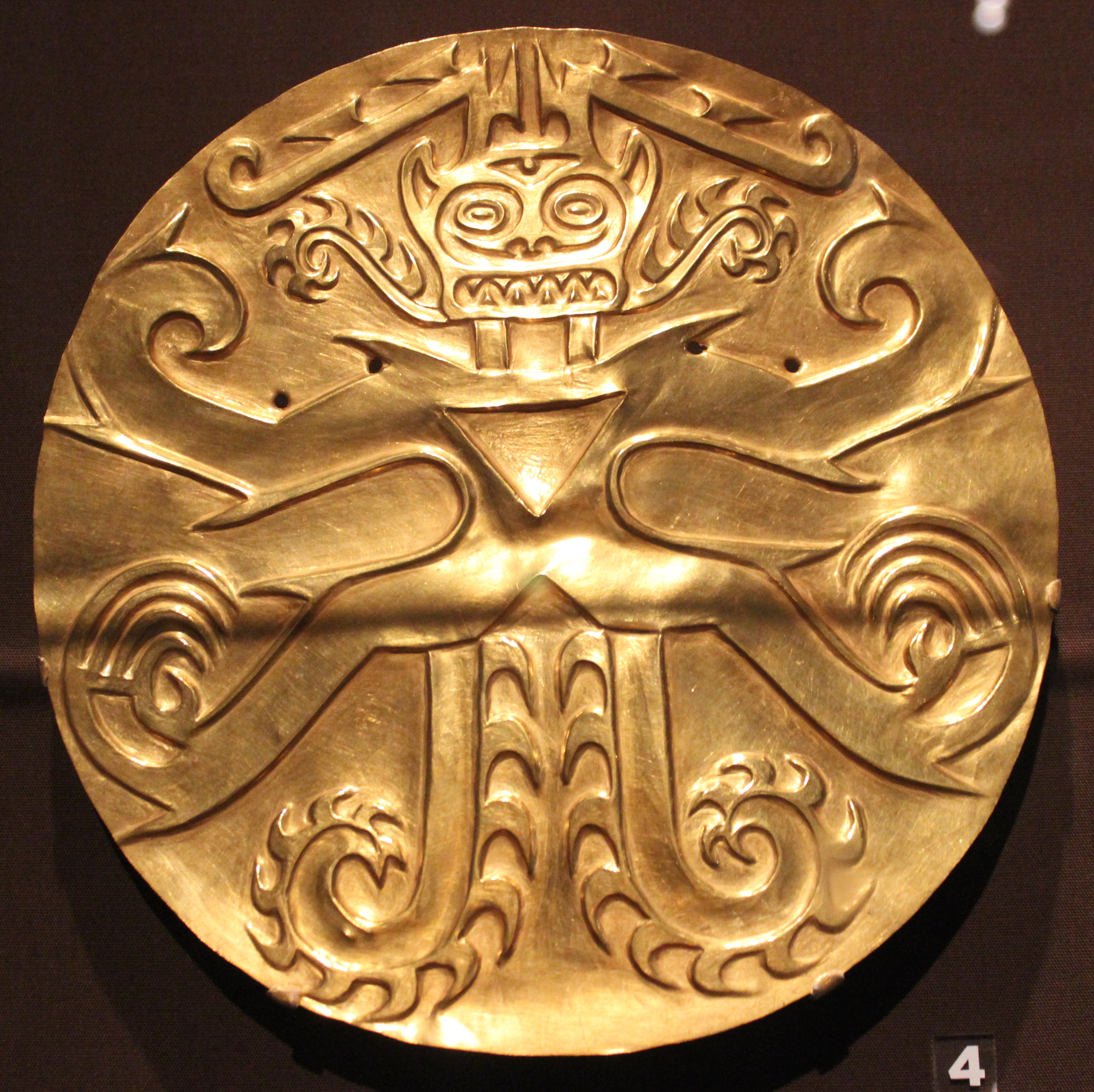
Coclé gold plaque or pectoral from Sitio Conte, Panama

Penn Museum's Mesoamerican collections include objects from Mexico, Guatemala, Belize, El Salvador, Honduras, Nicaragua, Panama and Costa Rica. The American Section's ethnographic collections from Mesoamerica include strong collections of masks, ceramics, and textiles from Guatemala, and very small collections from Mexico, Panama, Costa Rica, Nicaragua, and El Salvador. In Guatemala, Robert Burkitt acquired ethnographic ceramics, textiles, tools, hammocks, fans and gourds from the Alta Verapaz the early twentieth century.

The museum houses the outstanding Lilly de Jongh Osborne collection of 19th and early 20th century Guatemalan textiles, exceptional because of its complete outfits for men, women and children acquired systematically across different Guatemalan villages. This collection includes raw material and other objects and tools related to weaving. Ruben Reina studied the production of ceramics in Guatemala in the 1960s and 1970s, and collected ceramics and textiles from the region. The Section houses a large collection of Guatemalan masks amassed by James Moore in the 1960s.

Penn Museum conducted an excavation of the Mayan city of Tikal, Guatemala from 1956 to 1970. Many important artifacts from this excavation are on view in the museum, along with several stelae from the contemporary cities of Caracol and Piedras Negras. The gallery also displays many Aztecan, Oaxacan, and Teotihuacano artifacts.

On November 16, 2019, the Penn Museum launched a new exhibit entitled "The Mexico and Central America Gallery." This gallery features art and artifacts from eight Central American countries, including Guatemala, El Salvador, and Nicaragua. Specifically, one object of importance that is on display is Stela 14, a limestone rock with intricate carvings that stands at ten feet tall. Tatiana Proskouriakoff excavated this object in Piedras Negras, and at the time of its discovery, archaeologists could not decipher the Mayan hieroglyphics engraved in it. Proskouriakoff cross-referenced the glyphs on the Stela to historical events, eventually decoding the hieroglyphic language. Proskouriakoff's discovery transformed the field of Maya Studies.

==== South America ====
The museum's South American collections are as varied as the regions from which they come – the arid coast of Peru, the Andean Highlands, and the tropical lowlands of the Amazon Basin. The collections include anthropological materials from Argentina, Bolivia, Brazil, Chile, Colombia, Ecuador, Guyana, Paraguay, Peru, and Venezuela.

The American Section's ethnographic holdings from South America are strongest in materials from Bolivia, Brazil, Guyana, and Peru. The Aymara, Quechua, and Yuracaré of Bolivia are represented in early collections acquired by Max Uhle and William Curtis Farabee. More than thirty indigenous tribes from Brazil are represented in ethnographic collections acquired by Farabee and Vincenzo M. Petrullo in the 1920s and 1930s respectfully. Twelve different indigenous groups are represented in the collections acquired in Guyana by Farabee in the 1920s. More than twenty-five native groups from Peru are represented as well. Smaller collections represent some of the indigenous peoples of Argentina (Yahgan), Chile (Alacaluf, Mapuche), Colombia (Arhuaco, Chocó, Goajira, and Kogi), and Ecuador (Jívaro, Tumaco, Saparo).

==== Asia ====
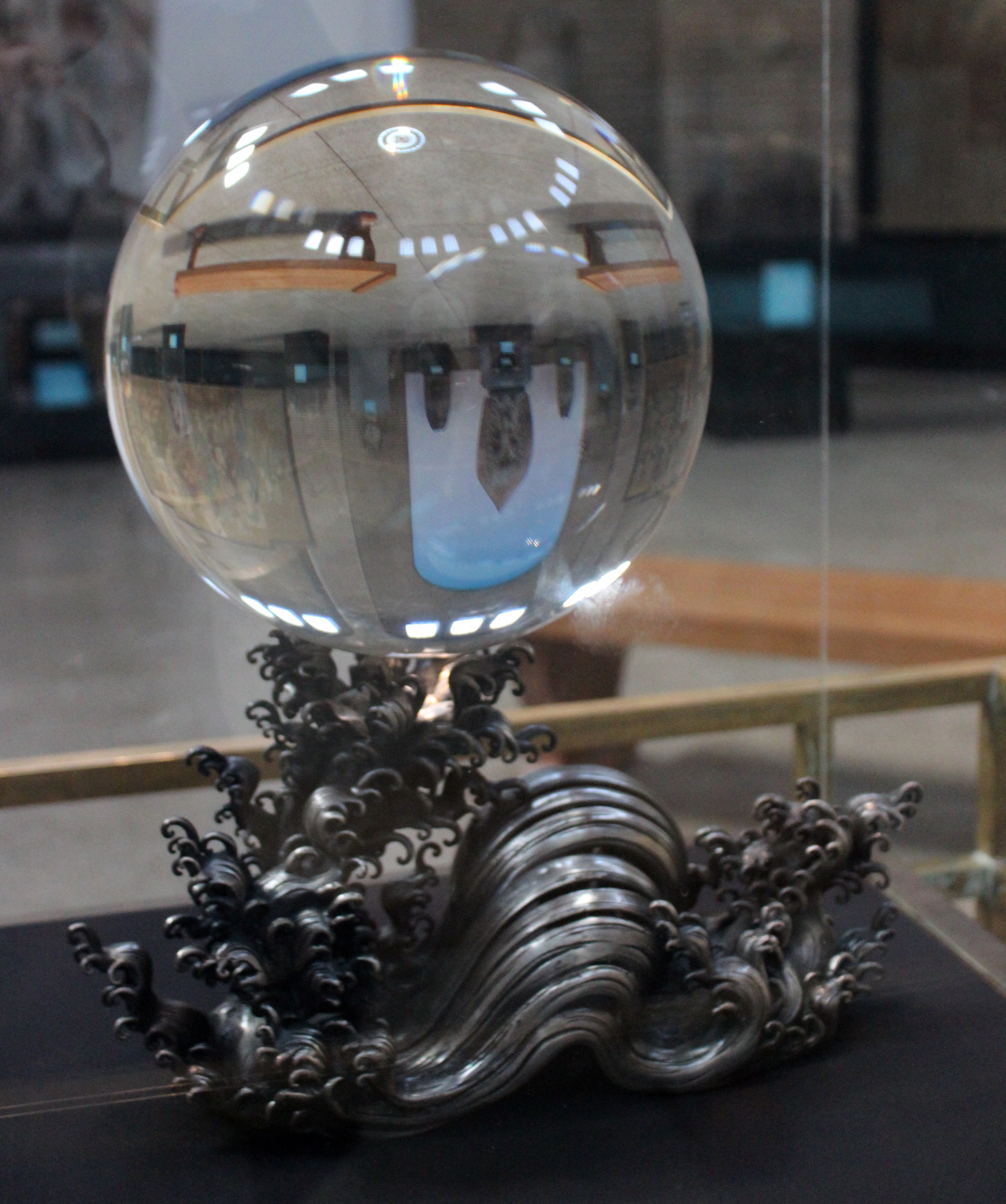
Rock-crystal sphere from the Qing dynasty

The Penn Museum's Asian collection is composed of close to 30,000 objects of art and artifacts from China, Tibet, Japan, South Korea, Taiwan, Vietnam, Myanmar, Cambodia, India and other Asian countries. Through the concerted efforts of Dr. George Byron Gordon, the majority of the collection on display focuses on China. From 1914-1918 and again in 1923-1924, Penn Museum archaeologists attempted archaeological expeditions in China that ended in failure. Consequently, the vast majority of the Chinese collection was purchased or donated through dealers in North America. Nevertheless, it includes a significant number of high quality works of antiquity. The Penn Museum acquired an important Asian collection from amateur collectors William and Isabel Ingram Mayer who made a collecting expedition across Mongolia and northern China in 1930-1931. The Mayer Collection consists of 464 small bronze daggers, harnesses, plaques, and a variety of ornaments that represent the "Ordos" style made by the Scythians and related nomadic peoples between the 12th century BCE and 3rd century CE, as well as some metalworks of more recent origin. Maxwell Sommerville (1829-1904), one of the first curators at the Penn Museum, contributed many items from Japan and India including a set of Kalighat paintings from India that represent almost the entire Hindu pantheon.

The Asia Galleries include Harrison Rotunda which measures ninety feet across and ninety feet from the floor. Since its completion in 1915, this gallery has showcased the Chinese collection. One of the central figures is a ceramic statue of a Luohan, reputed to be one of a group of eight or ten statues from a cave in Yizhou that date between 947 and 1234 CE. Other rare Chinese works of art on display are two of the six horse panels from Emperor Taizong's Mausoleum in Shaanxi Province. Each of these horses had names and poems commemorating their service in the fight to unify China during the Tang dynasty. The secular focus and historic realism of these reliefs marked a new direction in Chinese art. Four of the panels are at the Beilin Museum in Xi'an, while the only two to have left China were donated to the Penn Museum by Eldridge R. Johnson, the founder of the Victor Talking Machine Company. Johnson also donated the perfectly spherical crystal ball that sits in the center of the gallery. Along with an Egyptian statue of Osiris, the Chinese crystal ball was stolen in 1988. Shortly afterwards, a student found its elegant silver stand, a stylized ocean wave, in a culvert not far from the museum. The items were recovered in 1991 after a museum volunteer saw the statue in an antique shop across the Schuylkill River in New Jersey. The FBI then traced the crystal ball to a home in New Jersey and returned it to the museum without a clue that would reveal who the original thieves were or how they committed the crime.

==== Egypt ====
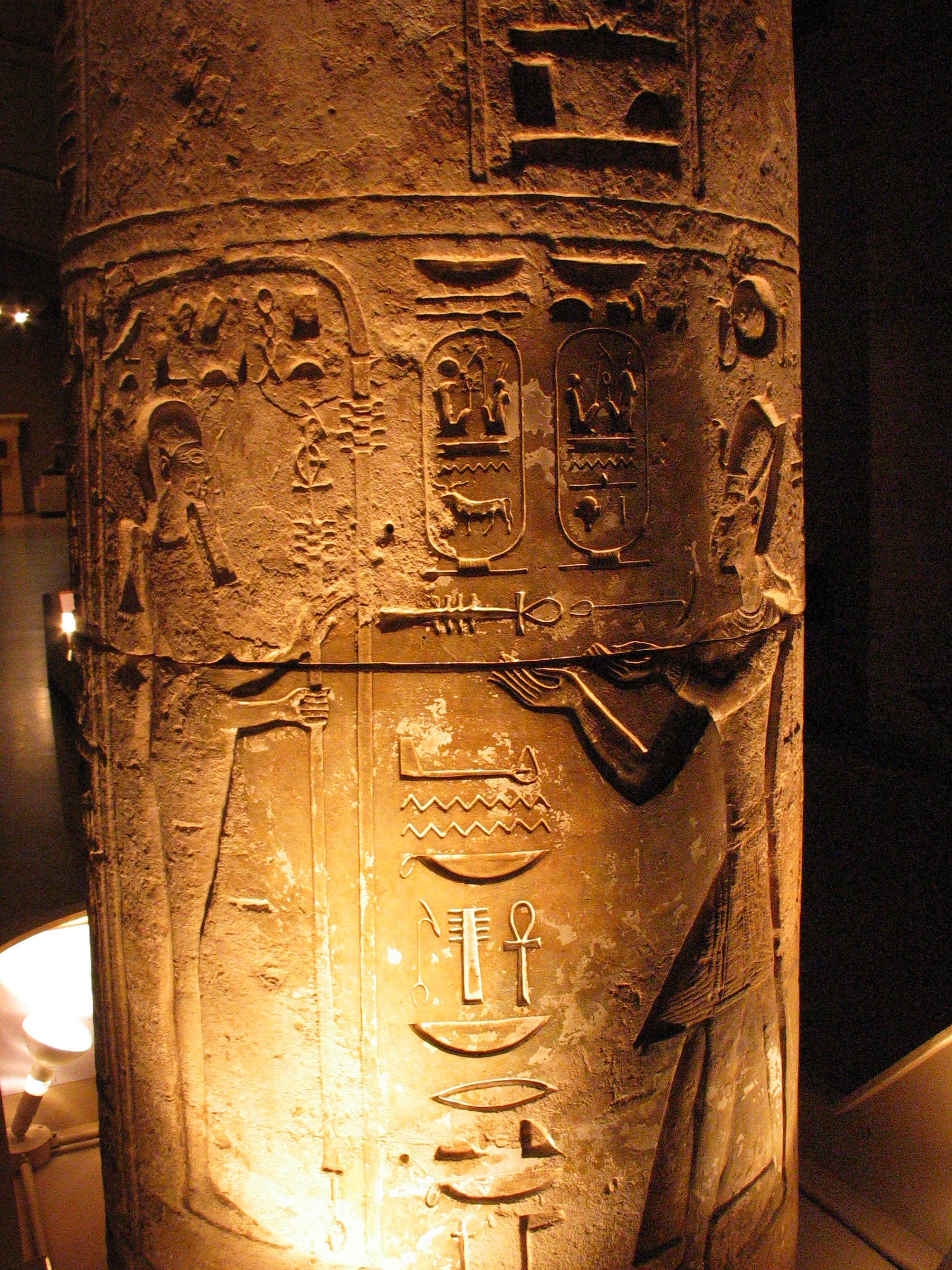
Merneptah presents an offering to Ptah on a stone column (University of Pennsylvania Museum)

The museum's collection of Egyptian artifacts is considered one of the finest in the world. The museum's Egyptian galleries house an extensive collection of statuary, mummies, and reliefs. Most notably, the museum houses a set of architectural elements, including large columns and a 13-ton granite Sphinx of Ramesses II, circa 1200 B.C., from the palace of the Pharaoh Merenptah. These were excavated by a museum expedition to Egypt in 1915. In the late 1970s Karl-Theodor Zauzich (attendant of the Egyptian section) discovered 3 missing fragments of the Insinger Papyrus in the museum's collections.

=== Iraq ===
The museum's most important collection is arguably that of the Royal Tombs of Ur, which The University of Pennsylvania co–excavated with the British Museum in Iraq. Ur was an important and wealthy city-state in ancient Sumer, and the artifacts from its royal tombs showcase the city's wealth. The collections consists of a variety of crowns, figures, and musical instruments, many of which have been inlaid with gold and precious stones. The often traveling collection includes a well known Bull-headed lyre. The museum's Babylonian section houses a collection of almost 30,000 clay tablets inscribed in Sumerian and Akkadian cuneiform, making it one of the ten largest collections in the world. The collection contains the largest number of Sumerian school tablets and literary compositions of any of the world's museums, as well as important administrative archives ranging from 2900 to 500 BCE.

=== Physical Anthropology Collections ===
==== Morton Collection ====
Penn Museum holds approximately 1,300 skulls collected by 19th century physician Samuel George Morton. The museum acquired the collection from the Academy of Natural Sciences in 1966. Morton has long been criticized for promoting white supremacist views, leveraging science to uphold racism, poor research quality, and unethically collecting human remains without consent. Despite this, the museum claims the collection is an important historic and research resource. The museum has actively conducted research using the collection in recent years. More than a dozen crania, along with mid-19th century measuring devices, were on public display at the museum from 2012 to 2013 in an exhibit named "Year of Proof: Making and Unmaking Race". In 2018, students in the Penn and Slavery project discovered the collection includes 55 crania of enslaved people, with 53 of these crania from Havana and two from the United States. In July 2020 the museum announced it would move the collection from a private classroom into storage after criticism from students and the local community. The museum is also planning to repatriate or rebury skulls of enslaved individuals. In 2024, the museum buried the remains of 19 African-American residents of Philadelphia that it held in its collection in Eden Cemetery, that has been used by the African-American community. The interment sparked criticism from prominent members and groups representing the African-American community in Philadelphia, who said that they had not been consulted on the matter.

==== MOVE Bombing Victim Remains ====
In April 2021, following critical news coverage, the Penn Museum and the University of Pennsylvania apologized to the Africa family and the community in general for allowing human remains from the 1985 MOVE bombing to be used in research and training. In 1986, an official from the Philadelphia City Medical Examiner's Office gave burned human remains found at the MOVE house to the museum for verification that the bones were those of 14 year old Katricia Dotson (a.k.a. Katricia or Tree Africa) and 12 year old Delisha Orr (a.k.a. Delisha Africa), although after the death certificates for both of those children were written, and after Dotson's family believed they were given Dotson's remains for burial in 1985. These remains were kept in a cardboard box in storage for decades and used for teaching by Alan Mann, a professor at Penn, and Janet Monge, Mann's graduate student and later curator of physical anthropology at the Penn Museum. Without the family's permission, in 2019 the bones were used as a case study in an online forensic course by Janet Monge. They were also used as the subject of a Penn senior thesis in anthropology which Monge supervised. Although the bones used by Monge in the online case study were given to MOVE members in 2021, accounts differ regarding how many remains were at the Penn Museum and whether all bones which were given to Mann and Monge in 1986 were returned in 2021. A legal team hired by the University of Pennsylvania stated that the bones of Delisha Orr were never at the Penn Museum. However, an investigation by the City of Philadelphia disagreed, and stated that there was evidence that remains of Delisha Orr were at the Penn Museum. Nine forensic anthropologists certified by the American Board of Forensic Anthropology disagreed with the claims published by Penn's legal team and agreed with those of the City of Philadelphia. The City of Philadelphia also questioned whether all the remains of Katricia Dotson which were at the Penn Museum were given to MOVE in 2021.

== See also ==
- Graduate Group in the Art and Archaeology of the Mediterranean World
- The Benghazi Venus
- List of museums with major collections of Egyptian antiquities
- Hiram M. Hiller, Jr.
- G. Roger Edwards
