= George Byron Gordon =

Canadian-American archaeologist (1870–1927)

George Byron Gordon (1870–1927) was a Canadian-American archaeologist, who graduated from Harvard University in 1894. While studying at Harvard, he participated in excavations at Copan in Honduras under the direction of John G. Owens in 1891. Following Owens’ death in the field, Gordon took command of the Copan expeditions from 1894 to 1895 and in 1900–1901. After his time in Honduras, George Byron Gordon was hired by the University of Pennsylvania where he led two expeditions to Alaska in 1905 and 1907. He spent the remainder of his twenty-four year employment at the University of Pennsylvania collecting antiquities for the University of Pennsylvania Museum of Archaeology and Anthropology’s North American collections, and he remains one of the museum's largest contributors of North American artifacts.

== Background ==
George Byron Gordon was born on August 4, 1870 in New Perth, Prince Edward Island, Canada to James Gordon and Jane MacLaren Gordon. In 1888, he began studying at the University of South Carolina. However, he only stayed for one year and finished his education at Harvard University. In 1892 he was selected to assist John G. Owens on his excavation in Copan, Honduras, which was sponsored by Harvard University. G.B. Gordon gained leadership of the expedition when Owens died during excavations. After that, he was given the position of Director of the Harvard-sponsored semesters in Copan that would run through 1900. In 1894, Gordon earned his Ph.D. from Harvard based on his work at Copan.

In 1927 Gordon was the Director of expeditions in Beisan (or Bet Sh’ean), known at the time as Mesopotamia, as well as Ur (located in Iraq). He also held membership in the Franklin Inn Club, the Rittenhouse Club, the American Anthropological Association, the American Philosophical Society, the Explorer's Club of New York, the Authors Club of London, the Lenape Club, and the American Ethnographical Society.

Gordon suffered fatal injuries from an accident that occurred at the Philadelphia Racquet Club, and he died on January 30, 1927, at the age of 56. With two companions the archeologist had attended a dinner of the Wilderness Club to hear Colonel Theodore Roosevelt and his brother Kermit describe their recent game hunt on the Tibetan highlands. Following the dinner Dr. Gordon started upstairs for his coat. He was suddenly stricken and fell backward to the marble floor below, striking his skull. He died in the Jefferson Hospital.

== Employment history ==
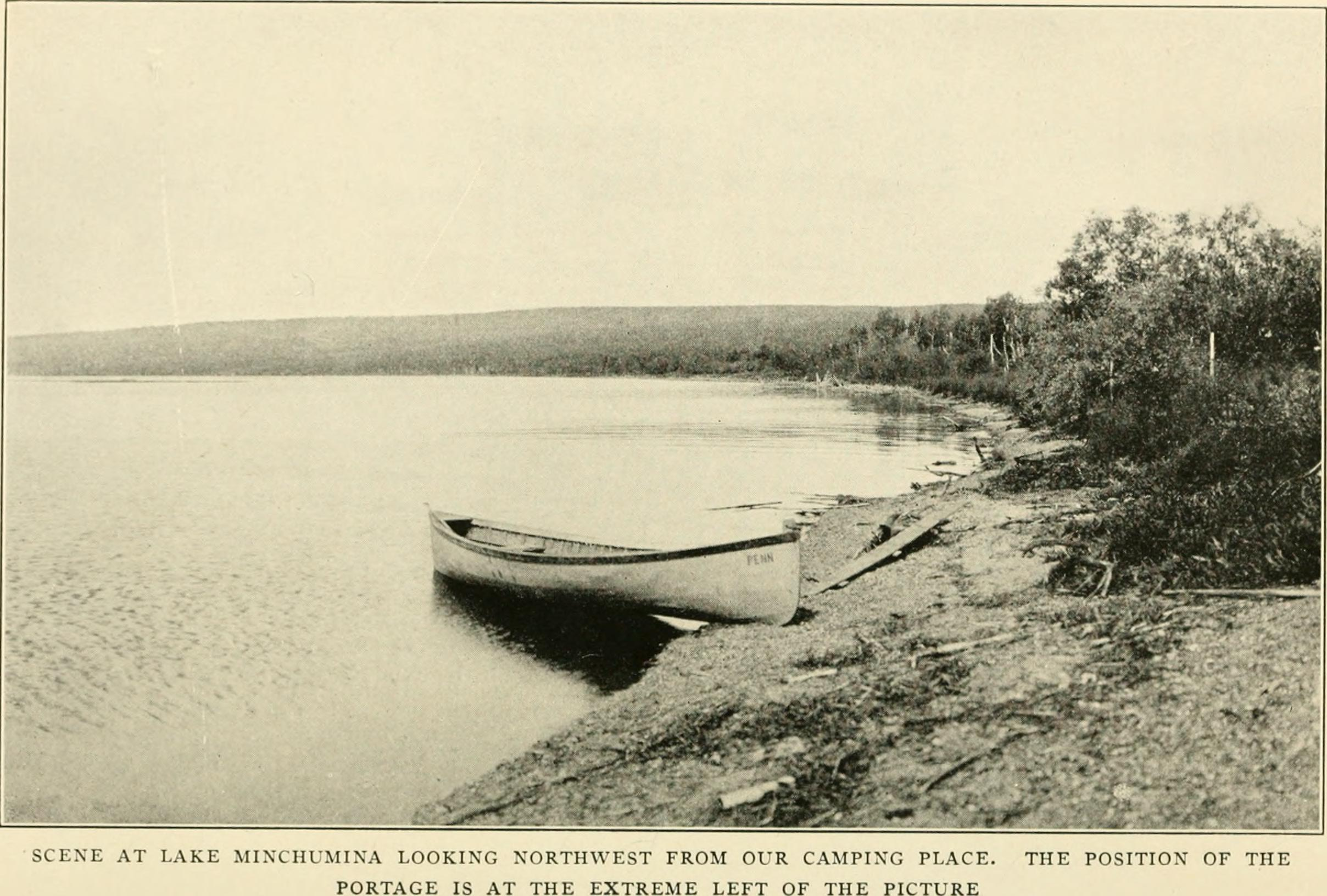
Scene at Lake Minchumina (In the Alaskan Wilderness)

In 1903, Gordon was named Assistant Curator of the Section of General Ethnology at the Free Museum of Science and Art at the University of Pennsylvania. By 1904 he was named General Curator of American Archaeology of the University of Pennsylvania Museum.

During his time at the University of Pennsylvania, he took two expeditions to Alaska in 1905 and 1907. His brother, MacLaren Gordon, joined him on these expeditions that were aimed at using new methods to explore the Arctic region. G.B. Gordon and his brother chose a path that had been previously undiscovered by other explorers and included regions along the Yukon River that led them into the Tanana; they then took the Tanana River southward into Lake Minchumina. Near Lake Minchumina, he encountered an aboriginal tribe that he named the "Kuskwagamutes". Gordon's expeditions revolutionized the way future expeditions into the Arctic were organized, and he described his methods in his book, In the Alaskan Wilderness.

From 1907 to 1915, Gordon taught undergraduate and graduate Anthropology courses at the University of Pennsylvania on a regular schedule. During this time, Gordon was named the Director of the Free Museum of Science and Art (subsequently renamed the University of Pennsylvania Museum) in 1910, and he helped formally establish the University of Pennsylvania's Anthropology Department. Also while employed by the University of Pennsylvania, Gordon founded the Museum Journal, which was subsequently renamed the Museum Bulletin. He purchased fine artifacts for the Museum, and supervised the addition of collections from Mesopotamia, Palestine, Egypt, and the Continental Americas. However, his crowning achievement is the Chinese collection that is still housed at the University of Pennsylvania Museum.

== Key excavations ==
In 1891, Gordon started his archaeological career as a graduate student at Harvard University under the guidance of John G. Owens in Copan, Honduras. Unfortunately, Owens died in the field, and Gordon became the leader of the Copan excavations in 1892. Gordon returned to Copan as the project director from 1894 to 1895 and 1900.

While in Copan, Gordon focused his research on the Hieroglyphic Stairway that was discovered in 1885 by Alfred P. Maudslay. Gordon uncovered fifteen steps of the stairway in situ. Unluckily, most of the blocks were severely damaged and located in the debris of the pyramid. The blocks containing hieroglyphic information were placed in the plaza after being cleaned, individually photographed, and labeled. More photographs were taken once the blocks were placed in the plaza on stone supports, and then casts were made of most of the blocks. Due to political turmoil in Honduras as well as an expired permit, the excavations ended in 1901, and Gordon returned to the United States to publish his results.

In 1905, Gordon visited Alaska with the intent of collecting ethnological items for the University of Pennsylvania Museum. He spent his summer season with eighteen communities of Inuit peoples along the Bering Sea coastline. Throughout this time, he collected 1,500 items and took 300 photographs. His collection came from Nunivak Island, Cape Prince of Wales, St. Michael, King Island, Diomede Island, Cape Nome, Unalakleet, Kotzebue Sound, Kuskokwim Bay, and East Cape Siberia, and included hide mittens, boots, bags, and clothing, in addition to paddles, kayaks, tools, and ceremonial items.

Thanks to the financial backing of his friend, George G. Heye, Gordon made another trip to Alaska in 1907. He travelled in a canoe along the Kuskokwim River in order to explore the interior lands. Gordon collected 300 items, including hunting and fishing tools, snowshoes, baskets, wooden buckets, lamps, earrings, and clothing.

== Research emphasis ==
Gordon was primarily interested in the Arctic, including Alaska and Canada. Although he took two expeditions to Alaska, Gordon acquired artifacts from other arctic expeditions to Alaska and Canada throughout his time with the University of Pennsylvania to add to his collections at the museum.

== Awards and honors ==
- 1914 – Vice President of the American Anthropological Association
- 1915 – American Anthropological Association Council member
- 1917 – Vice President and Council member of the American Anthropological Association
- 1918 – American Anthropological Association Executive Committee member and Council member
- 1926 – Received an honorary degree of Doctor of Science from the University of Pennsylvania.

== Selected books ==
- In the Alaskan Wilderness. (George B. Gordon). 1917. John C. Winston Company, Philadelphia, Pennsylvania.
- Rambles in Old London (George Byron Gordon). 1924. George W. Jacobs & Company, Philadelphia, Pennsylvania.

== Selected papers ==
- Prehistoric Ruins of Copan, Honduras. (George B. Gordon). 1896. Peabody Museum of Archaeology and Ethnology Papers 1(1).
- Researches in the Uloa Valley, Honduras. (George B. Gordon). 1898. Peabody Museum of Archaeology and Ethnology Papers 1(4).
- Caverns of Copan, Honduras. (George B. Gordon). 1898. Peabody Museum of Archaeology and Ethnology Papers 1(5).
- The Ruined City of Copan. (George Byron Gordon). 1899. Journal of the American Geographical Society of New York 31(1):39–50.
- On the Interpretation of a Certain Group of Sculptures at Copan. (George Byron Gordon). 1902. American Anthropologist 4(1):130–143.
- On the Use of Zero and Twenty in the Maya Time System. (George Byron Gordon). 1902. American Anthropologist 4(2):237–275.
- Examples of Maya Pottery in the Museum and in Other Collections. (George B. Gordon and John A. Mason). 1925–1943. Philadelphia: University Museum, University of Pennsylvania.
