= 736 =

Calendar year

736 in various calendars
Gregorian calendar	736; DCCXXXVI
Ab urbe condita	1489
Armenian calendar	185; ԹՎ ՃՁԵ
Assyrian calendar	5486
Balinese saka calendar	657–658
Bengali calendar	142–143
Berber calendar	1686
Buddhist calendar	1280
Burmese calendar	98
Byzantine calendar	6244–6245
Chinese calendar	乙亥年 (Wood Pig); 3433 or 3226 — to — 丙子年 (Fire Rat); 3434 or 3227
Coptic calendar	452–453
Discordian calendar	1902
Ethiopian calendar	728–729
Hebrew calendar	4496–4497
- Hindu calendars
Vikram Samvat	792–793
Shaka Samvat	657–658
Kali Yuga	3836–3837
Holocene calendar	10736
Iranian calendar	114–115
Islamic calendar	117–118
Japanese calendar	Tenpyō 8 (天平８年)
Javanese calendar	629–630
Julian calendar	736; DCCXXXVI
Korean calendar	3069
Minguo calendar	1176 before ROC 民前1176年
Nanakshahi calendar	−732
Seleucid era	1047/1048 AG
Thai solar calendar	1278–1279
Tibetan calendar	ཤིང་མོ་ཕག་ལོ་ (female Wood-Boar); 862 or 481 or −291 — to — མེ་ཕོ་བྱི་བ་ལོ་ (male Fire-Rat); 863 or 482 or −290

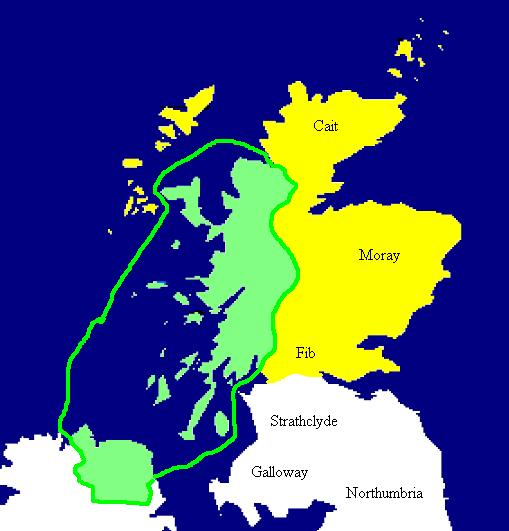
Map of Dál Riata (modern Scotland)

Year 736 (DCCXXXVI) was a leap year starting on Sunday of the Julian calendar, the 736th year of the Common Era (CE) and Anno Domini (AD) designations, the 736th year of the 1st millennium, the 36th year of the 8th century, and the 7th year of the 730s decade. The denomination 736 for this year has been used since the early medieval period, when the Anno Domini calendar era became the prevalent method in Europe for naming years.

== Events ==
=== By place ===
==== Europe ====
- Charles Martel, Merovingian mayor of the palace, forms local alliances with the Burgundians, and imposes Frankish domination on Provence. He defeats Muslim forces at Sernhac and Beaucaire in Septimania (Southern France).
- Battle of Nîmes: The Franks under Charles Martel fail to capture Narbonne but devastate most of the other settlements, including Nîmes, Agde, Béziers and Maguelonne, which Martel views as potential strongholds of the Umayyads.

==== Britain ====
- King Æthelbald of Mercia is described in the Ismere Diploma as ruler (bretwalda) of the Mercians, and all the provinces in southern England. He is also named "Rex Britanniae" (king of Britain).
- King Óengus I of the Picts invades the neighbouring kingdom of Dál Riata, which is subjugated. He takes the fortress of Dunadd, and establishes his rule in Scotland for over two decades.

==== Asia ====
- Rōben, scholar-Buddhist monk, invites Shinshō to give lectures on the Avatamsaka Sutra at Kinshōsen-ji (later Tōdai-ji); this event is considered to be the roots of the Kegon school of Buddhism founded in Japan.

==== Central America ====
- June 15 – Uaxaclajuun Ub'aah K'awiil ("Eighteen Rabbit"), ruler of the Mayan city state of Copán in Honduras is defeated in battle by Kʼakʼ Tiliw Chan Yopaat, the ruler of Quiriguá (in Guatemala), and is beheaded. K'ak' ("Smoke Monkey") rules until his death in 749.
- Third Tikal-Calakmul War: A diplomatic team from Calakmul, led by Wamaw K'awiil, meets with Quiriguá leader K’ak Tiliw Chan Yopaa, in an attempt to negotiate an end to the city's rebellion.
- The Mayan city state of Tikal defeats Calakmul in what is now Guatemala, ending a centuries-long rivalry, but ushering in another century of warfare that ultimately leads to both cities' abandonment in the 9th century.
- Yik'in Chan K'awiil, ruler (ajaw) of the leading Maya city state of Tikal (modern-day Guatemala), conquers rival Calakmul, within the northern Petén region of the Yucatán region (Southern Mexico).

== Births ==
- Hun Jian, Chinese general
- Zhao Jing, Chinese official

== Deaths ==
- Hugbert, duke of Bavaria
- Kʼinich Ahkal Moʼ Nahb III, Maya ruler of Palenque
- Muiredach mac Ainbcellaig, king of Dál Riata
- Yamabe no Akahito, Japanese poet
