= Sky Xul =

Mayan king of Quiriguá (ruled 785–c.795)

- Ajaw
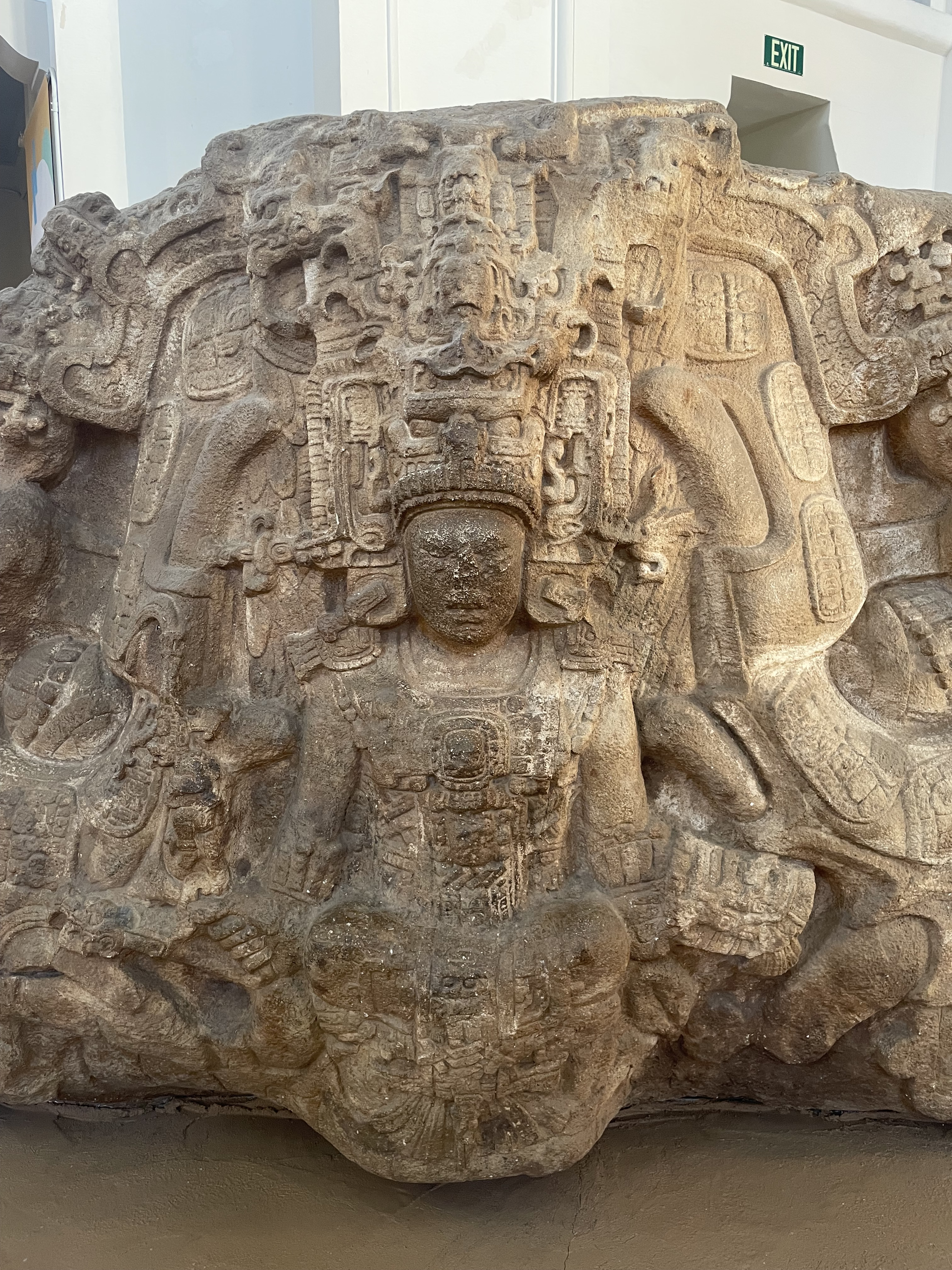
- Sky Xul as depicted on Zoomorph P.

King of Quiriguá
- Reign: 15 October 785 – c.795
- Predecessor: K'ak' Tiliw Chan Yopaat
- Successor: Jade Sky
- Born: Quiriguá
- Died: c.795 – 800; Quiriguá
- Issue: Jade Sky (possibly)
- Father: K'ak' Tiliw Chan Yopaat (possibly)
- Religion: Maya religion

Sky Xul was a king (ajaw) of Maya city-state Quiriguá in Guatemala, who ruled from 785 – c. 795.

== Biography ==
Sky Xul became the reigning lord of Quiriguá, 78 days after the death of K'ak' Tiliw Chan Yopaat, who is thought to have been his father.

His reign lasted from 10 to 15 years and was a period of continued activity. Most of the Maya region cities already were suffering terminal decline, engulfed by the Classic Maya collapse. But in Quiriguá, Sky Xul dedicated three great zoomorph sculptures and two altars, considered marvels of Maya stoneworking. Sky Xul died some time between 795 and 800.

Jade Sky succeeded Sky Xul and was the last ruler of Quiriguá.
