= Tutuum Yohl Kʼinich =

Mayan king

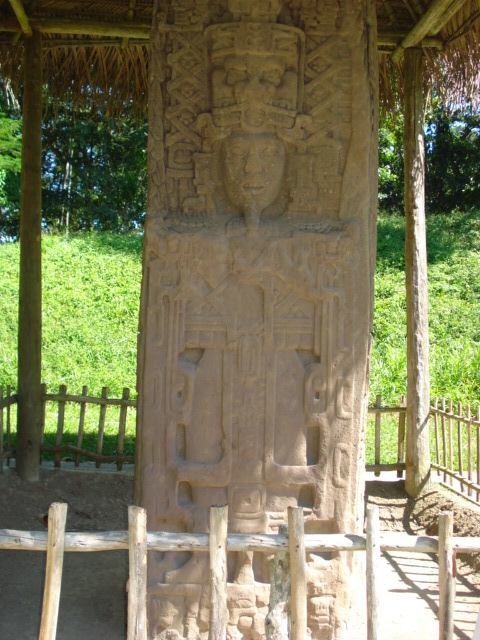
- Stela C of Quiriguá contains references to 455 and Tutuum Yohl Kʼinich
- Predecessor: Tok Casper
- Successor: Ruler 3 of Quiriguá

Tutuum Yohl Kʼinich (c. 455) was the second known king of Maya city-state Quiriguá in Guatemala.

He was named after the Sun god, Kinich Ahau.

It is recorded that a stela, as yet undiscovered, was erected in 455 by Tutuum Yohl Kʼinich.
