= Jade Sky =

- Ajaw
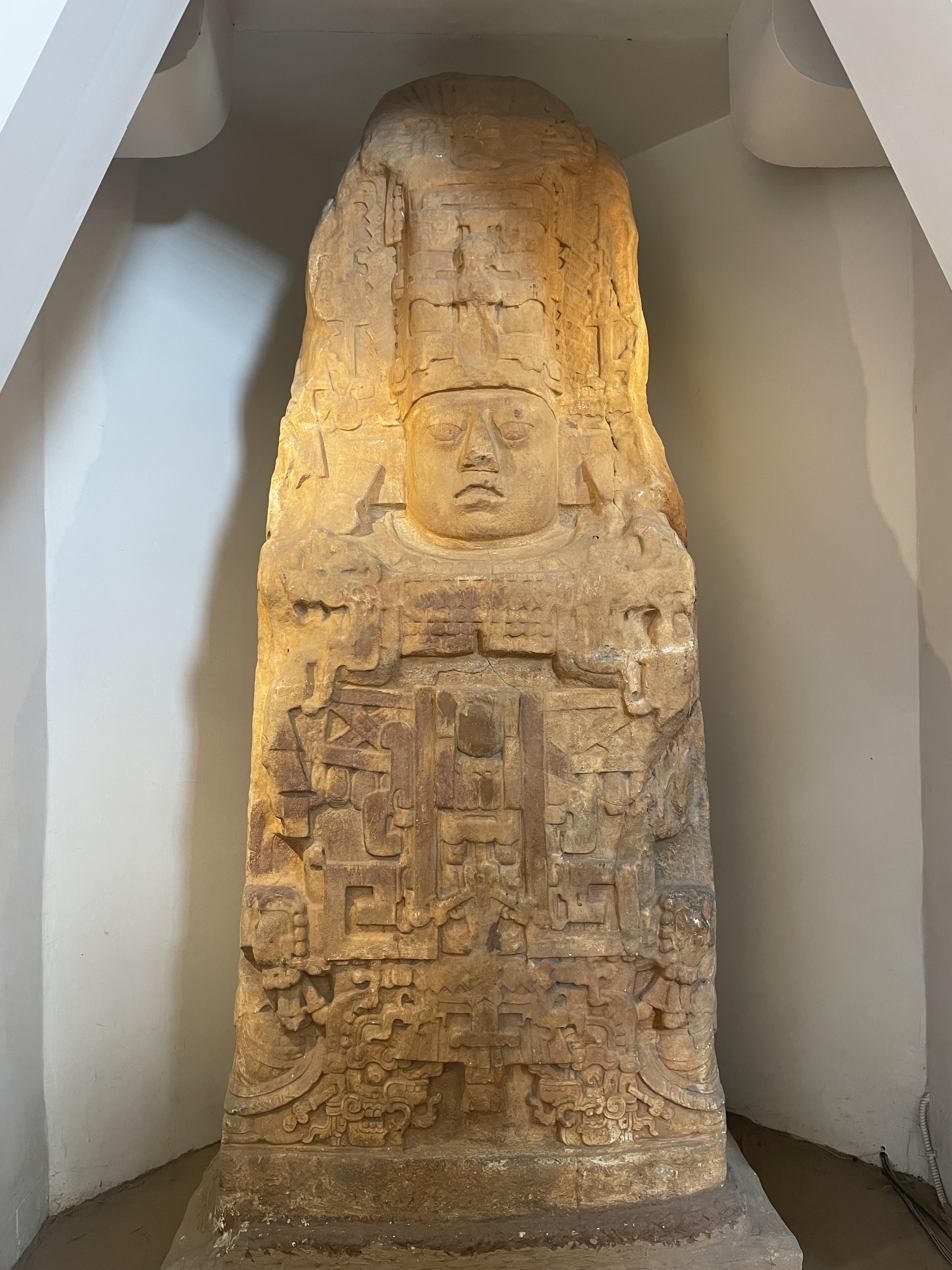
- Jade Sky as depicted on Stela K at Quiriguá

King of Quiriguá
- Reign: c.800 - 810
- Predecessor: Sky Xul
- Born: Quiriguá
- Died: c.810 Quiriguá
- Father: Sky Xul (possibly)
- Religion: Maya religion

Jade Sky (ruled c. 800 – c. 810) was the last recorded king of the Maya city-state Quirigua in Guatemala, a successor of Sky Xul, who was maybe a son of great king K'ak' Tiliw Chan Yopaat.

Taking the throne between 795 and 800 during the Classic Maya Collapse, Quirigua's fortunes began to decline during Jade Sky's rule. Although he was able to build several monuments, they are much smaller and less detailed than those commissioned by previous kings. This indicates that he was unable to call upon the resources that the previous kings of Quirigua could. Although his fate is not known for certain, the final inscription at Quirigua is dated 26 June 810, making Jade Sky the last recorded ruler of Quirigua.
