= Tok Casper =

Tok Ch'ich', formerly nicknamed as Tok Casper, was the first known king of the petty Maya kingdom of Quiriguá, in what is now south-eastern Guatemala. His name is a nickname, "Casper" being Casper the Friendly Ghost whose head shows a certain resemblance to the hieroglyph of unknown meaning that constitutes the second part of the king's Mayan name. "Tok Casper" took the throne in 426 AD and was installed by K'inich Yax K'uk' Mo', king of nearby Copán. His successor was a Tutuum Yohl K'inich about whom nothing specific is known.
