= Quiriguá =

Maya archaeological site in Guatemala

- Ik' Naahb' Nal (Epigraphic Mayan)

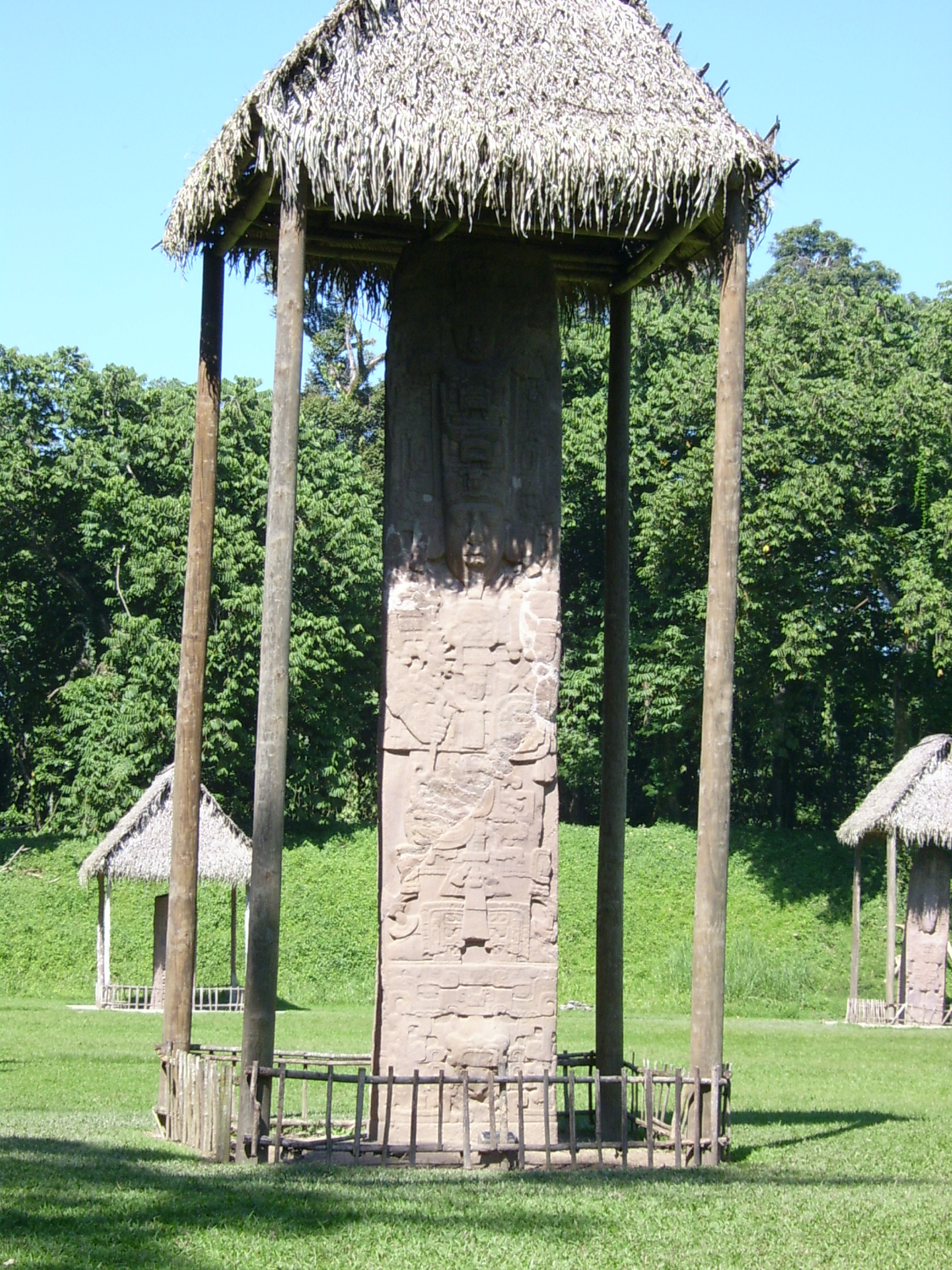
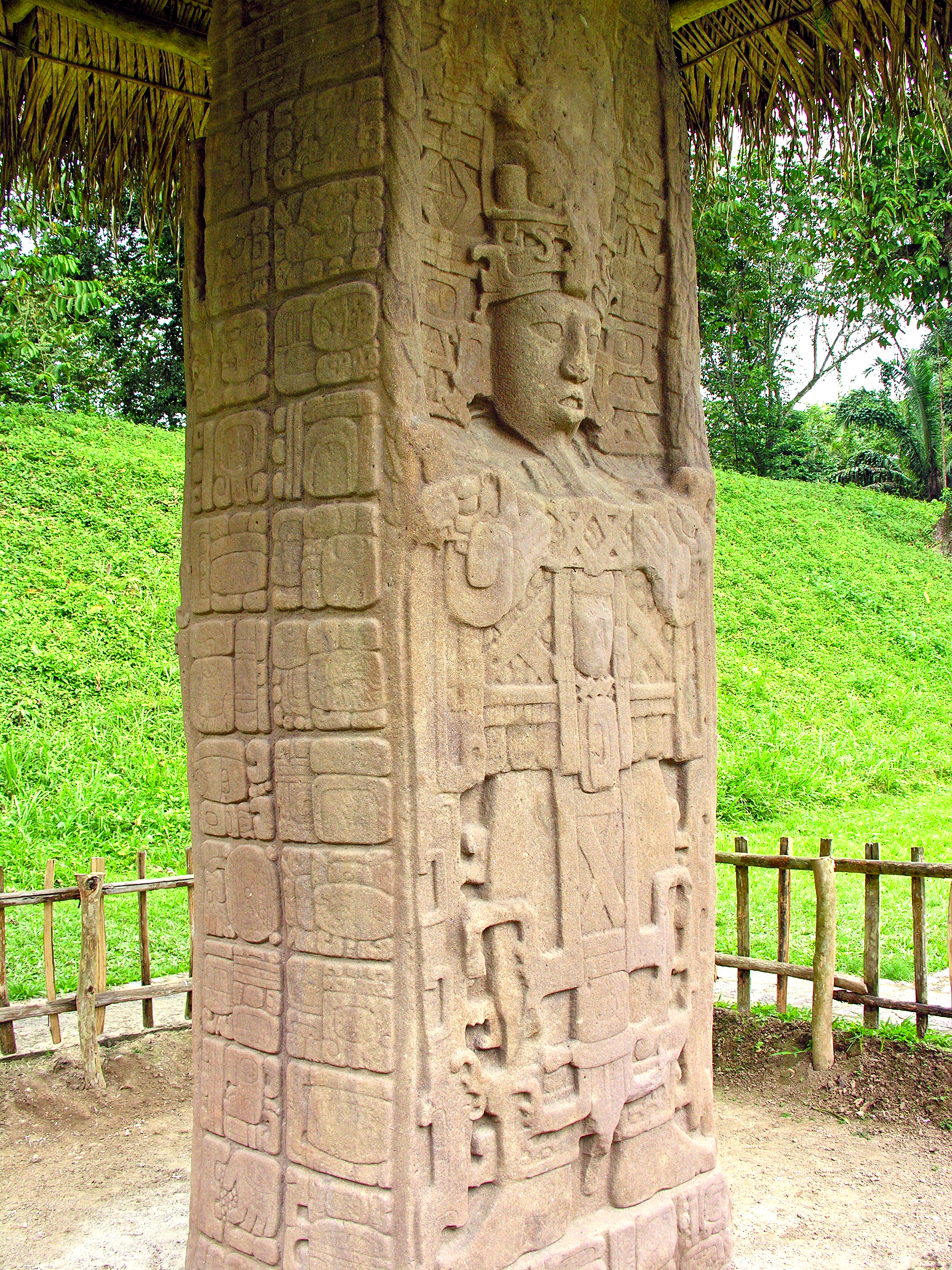
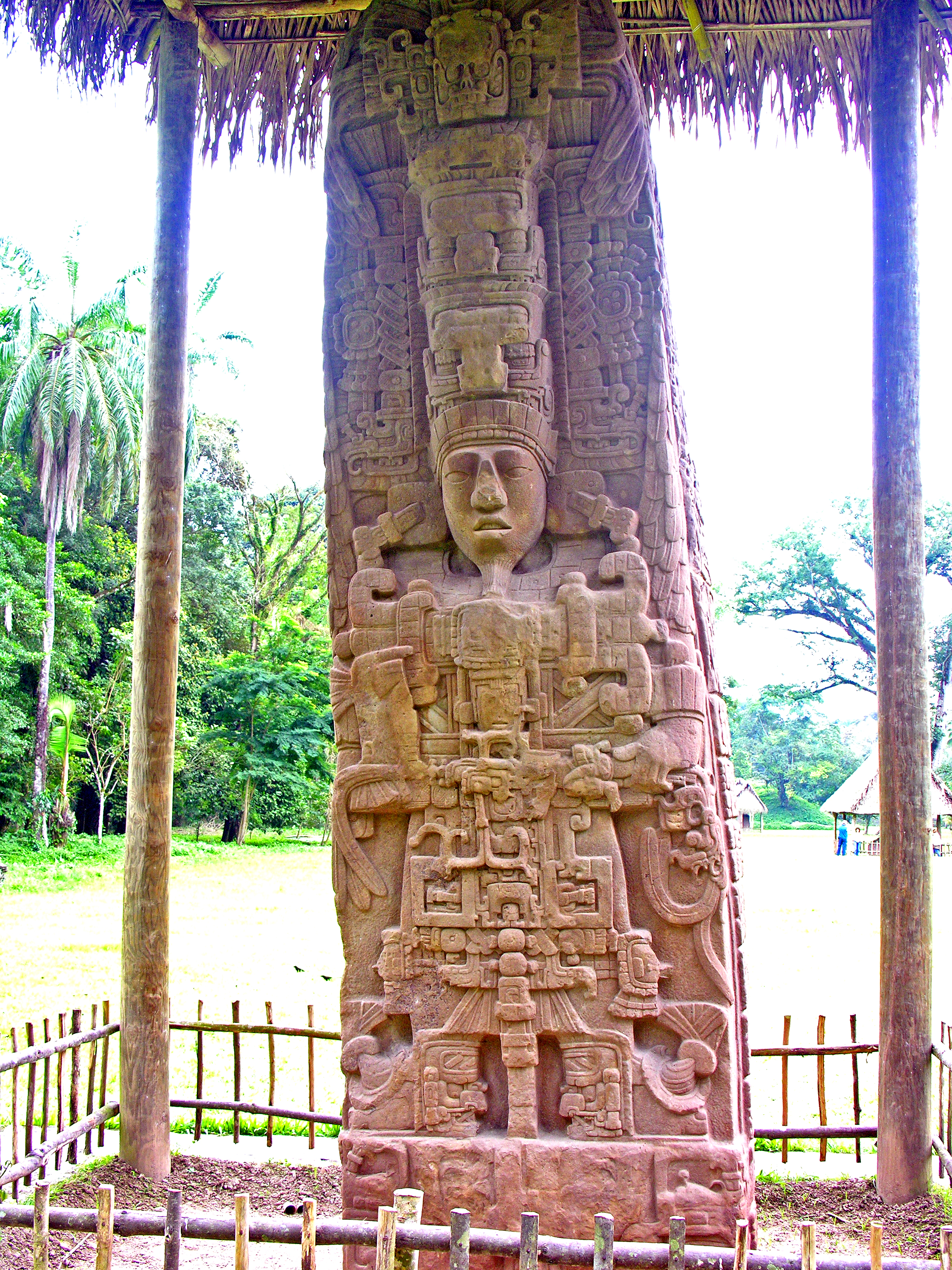
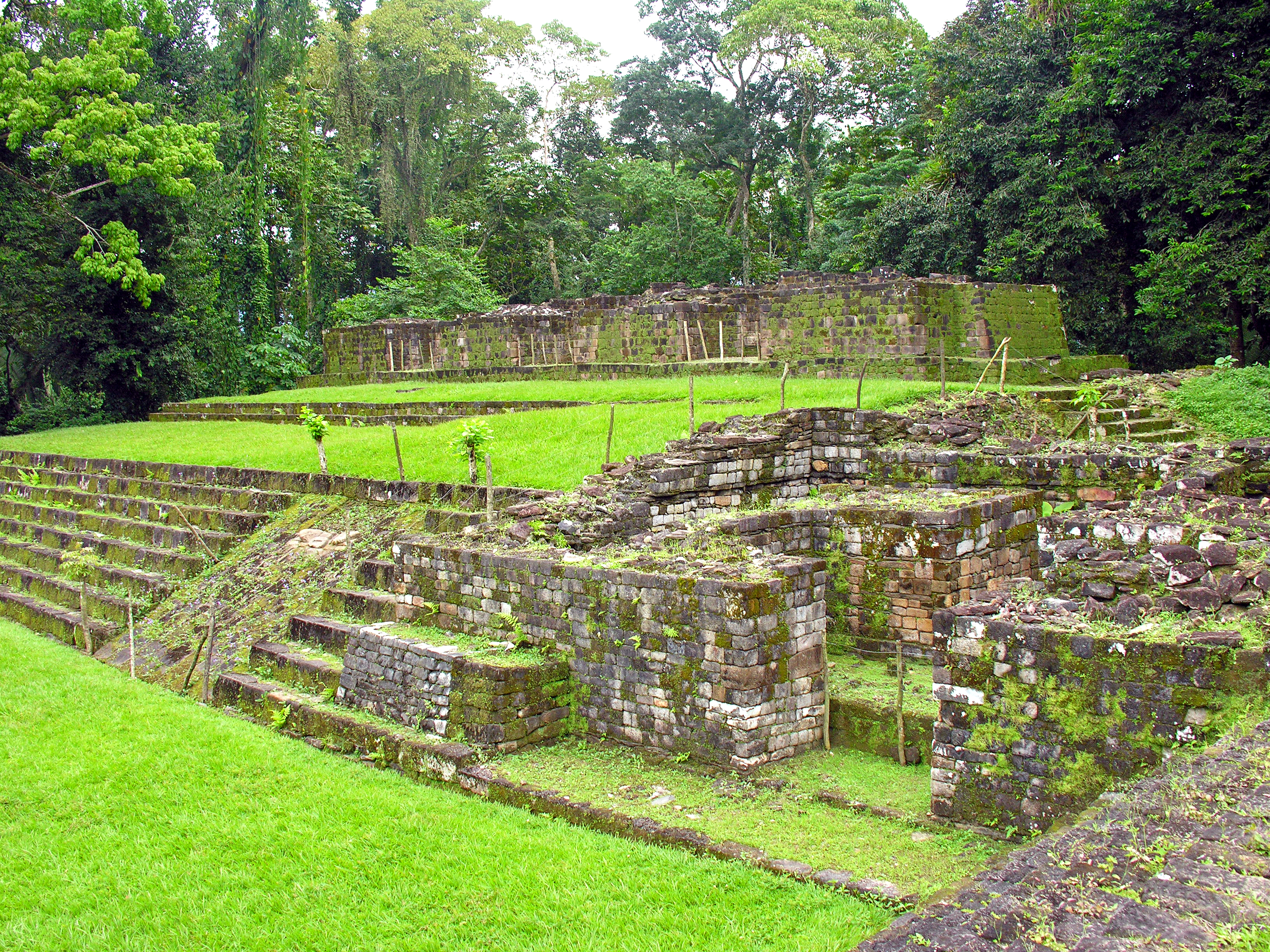
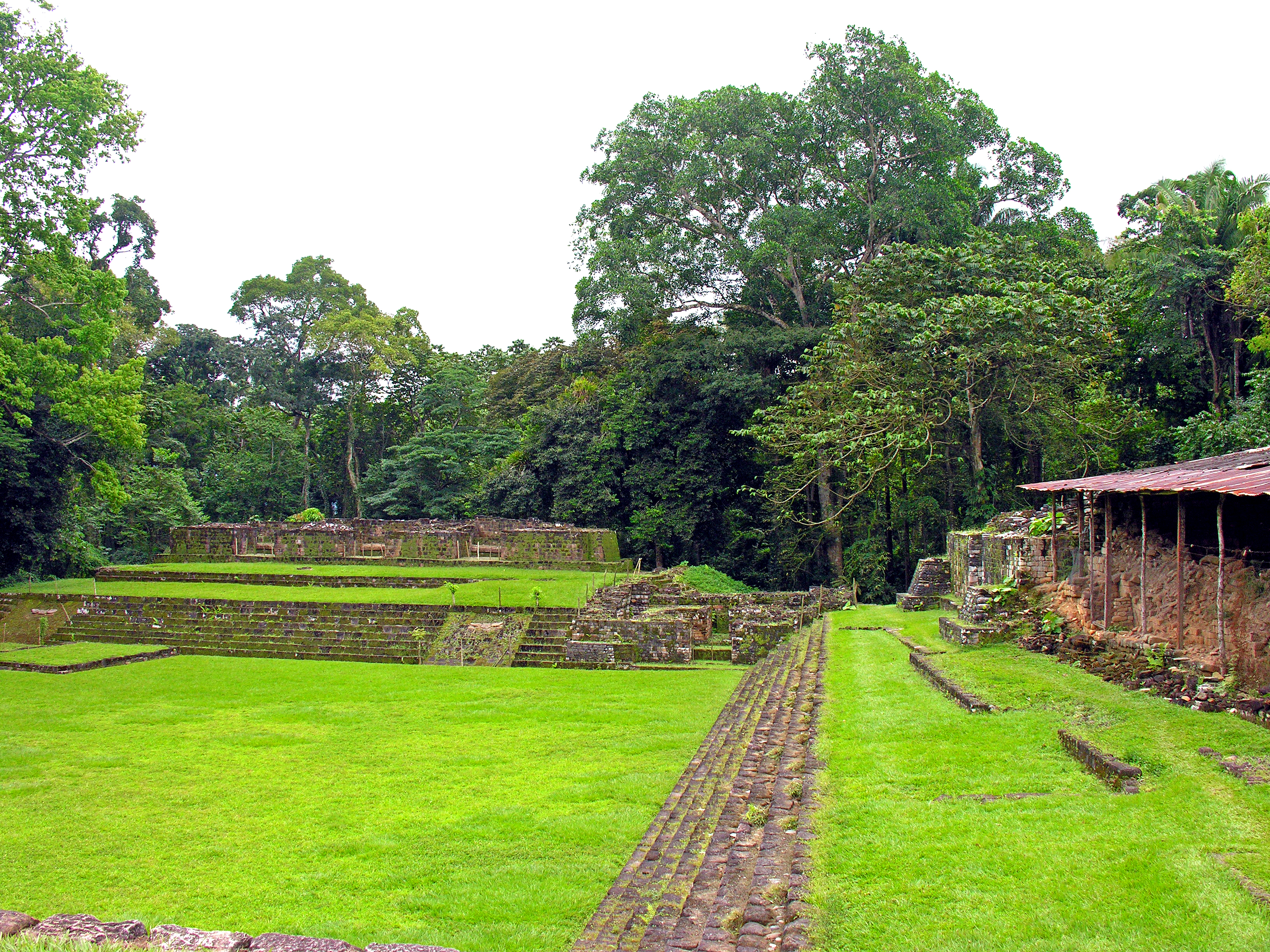
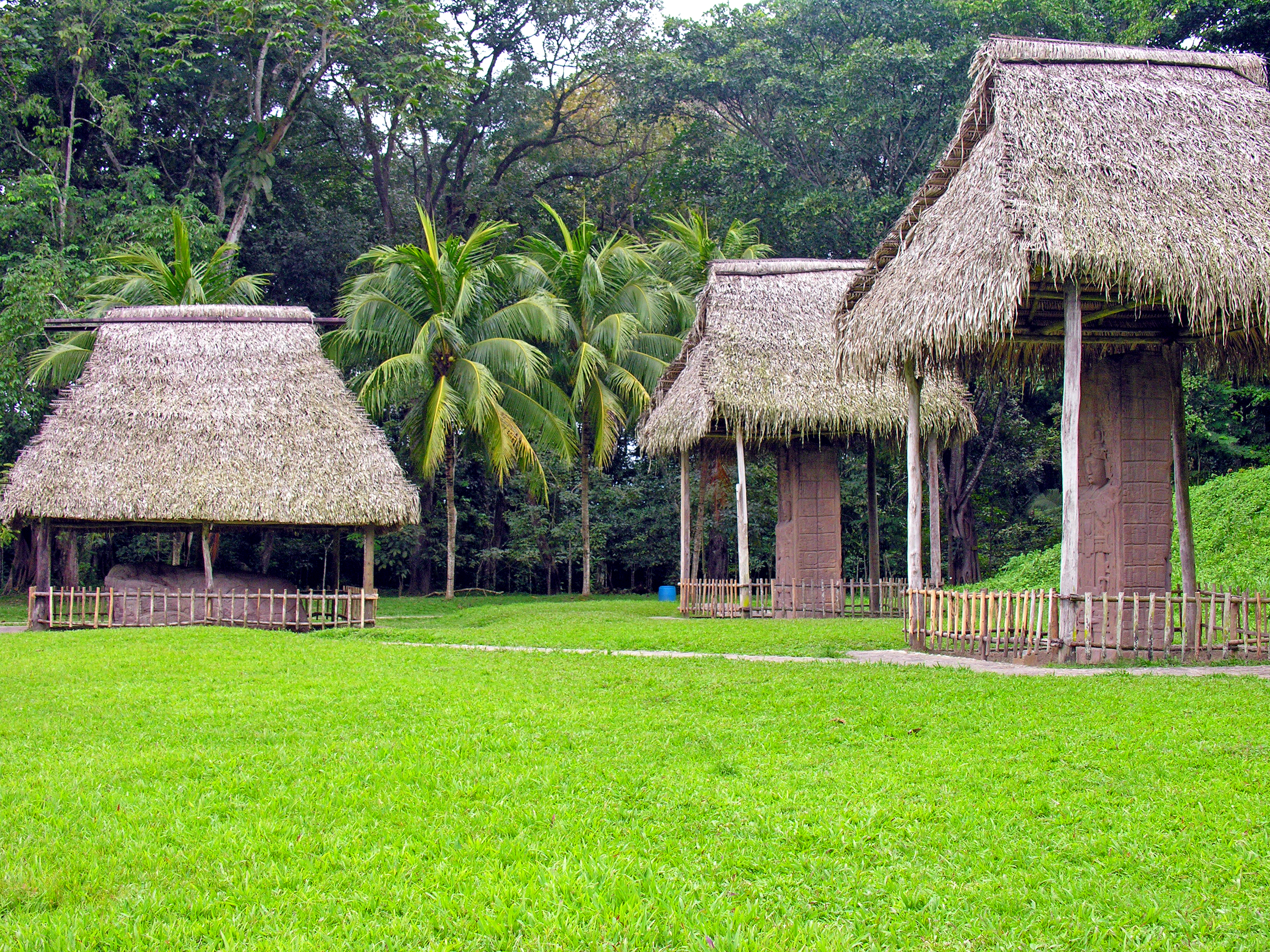
- Stela E Stela C of Quiriguá Stela D of Quiriguá Structure 1B-1 View of the acropolis Partial view of the archaeological site

- Location within Mesoamerica Location within Guatemala
- 15°16′10″N 89°2′25″W
- Periods: Late Preclassic to Early Postclassic
- Cultures: Maya civilization
- Location: Izabal Department, Guatemala

UNESCO World Heritage Site
- Official name: Archaeological Park and Ruins of Quiriguá
- Type: Cultural
- Criteria: i, ii, iv
- Designated: 1981 (5th session)
- Reference no.: 149
- Region: Latin America and the Caribbean

Quiriguá (Spanish pronunciation: [kiɾiˈɣwa]) is an ancient Maya archaeological site in the department of Izabal in south-eastern Guatemala. It is a medium-sized site covering approximately 3 square kilometres (1.2 sq mi) along the lower Motagua River, with the ceremonial center about 1 km (0.6 mi) from the north bank. During the Maya Classic Period (AD 200–900), Quiriguá was situated at the juncture of several important trade routes. The site was occupied by 200, construction on the acropolis had begun by about 550, and an explosion of grander construction started in the 8th century. All construction had halted by about 850, except for a brief period of reoccupation in the Early Postclassic (c. 900 – c. 1200). Quiriguá shares its architectural and sculptural styles with the nearby Classic Period city of Copán, with whose history it is closely entwined.

Quiriguá's rapid expansion in the 8th century was tied to king K'ak' Tiliw Chan Yopaat's military victory over Copán in 738. When the greatest king of Copán, Uaxaclajuun Ub'aah K'awiil or "18-Rabbit", was defeated, he was captured and then sacrificed in the Great Plaza at Quiriguá. Before this, Quiriguá had been a vassal state of Copán, but it maintained its independence afterwards. The ceremonial architecture at Quiriguá is quite modest, but the site's importance lies in its wealth of sculpture, including the tallest stele erected in the Mayan world. Because of its historical importance, the site of Quiriguá was inscribed on the UNESCO World Heritage List in 1981.

== Name and location ==
The southern Maya area, showing the locations of Quiriguá and Copán

The location of Quiriguá on the Motagua River, with relation to sources of jade

The archaeological site of Quiriguá is named after the nearby village of the same name, and is located a little over 200 km (120 mi) northeast of Guatemala City; it lies in the municipality of Los Amates in the department of Izabal and has an elevation of 75 m (246 ft) above mean sea level.

Positioned on the north bank of the lower reaches of the Motagua River, Quiriguá is situated at the point where the valley broadens into a flood plain, which has exposed the site to periodic flooding over the centuries. Although the river passed close to the site during the period of the city's occupation, it has since changed course and now flows 1 km (0.6 mi) south of the ceremonial centre. Quiriguá is 48 km (30 mi) north of Copán, and is located 15.7 km (9.8 mi) north-west of the international border with Honduras.

The local bedrock is a hard red sandstone, which the inhabitants used in the construction of monuments and architecture. This local sandstone is very strong and not prone to shearing or fracturing, allowing the sculptors at Quiriguá to erect the tallest freestanding stone monuments in the Americas. Quiriguá was built directly over the Motagua Fault and the city suffered damage in ancient times as a result of major earthquakes.

== Population ==
Although the Quiriguá elite were clearly Maya in ethnicity, the site lies on the southern periphery of the Mesoamerican area and the population was at least bi-ethnic, with ethnic Maya in a minority. The majority of the population belonged ethnically to the less complex Intermediate Area lying beyond the eastern border of Mesoamerica. The population density of the site has been estimated at 400 to 500 per square kilometer (1040 to 1300 per square mile) in the centre of the city during the Late Classic with an estimated peak population of 1200–1600; surveys have revealed an average of 130 structures per square kilometer (338 per square mile) at the site, compared with 1449 structures/km^{2} (3767 per square mile) in central Copán. The low population density indicates that Quiriguá served as the focus for a dispersed rural population.

The population levels of the Quiriguá valley increased rapidly after the successful rebellion against Copán in 738, although it was never a heavily populated site. In the 9th century there was a severe decline in population, culminating in the abandonment of the city.

== Economy ==
The Motagua River flows down from the western Guatemalan highlands, and Quiriguá was ideally positioned to control the trade of uncut jade, the majority of which was found in the middle reaches of the Motagua Valley, as well as controlling the flow of other important commodities up and down the river such as cacao, which was produced as a local cash crop. Although cacao was produced for trade, maize remained the primary local crop due to its central role in the Maya diet. In addition, maize probably formed an important component in the site's tribute payments to its overlords at Copán, a city that was exhausting its own local resources. Although little jade has been recovered from the site, there is evidence for trade in obsidian originating from the Ixtepeque source situated near the upper reaches of the Motagua.

In the Classic Period, the location of the site would have placed Quiriguá on a crossroads between the trading route from the highlands to the Caribbean coast and the route from Copán to the major cities of the Petén Basin.

== Known rulers ==
As recorded on hieroglyphic inscriptions at Quiriguá, all dates are AD. Maya inscriptions for rulers sometimes include reference to a number ("tzakbul-number" or count, named after its main glyph) that are believed to specify the position of that ruler in the sequence of dynastic succession to the rulership of the site. Thus a tzakbul-number of five indicates the ruler was fifth in the line of dynastic succession.

Name (or nickname)	Ruled	Dynastic succession no.
"Tok Ch'ich' "	426–?	1
Tutuum Yohl K'inich	c. 455	2
Mih Toh	c. 480	3
Chan [Yop]aat	493+	4
Unknown rulers	500+	5+
K'awiil Yopaat ("Ruler 5")	c. 653	12?
?...Kin Chaahk		13?
K'ak' Tiliw Chan Yopaat ("Cauac Sky" or "Kawak Sky")	724–785	14?
Chan Tiliw Yopaat ("Sky Xul")	785 – c. 795	15?
K'ahk' Jolow Chan Yopaat ("Jade Sky")	c. 800 – c. 810	16?

== History ==
=== Early history ===
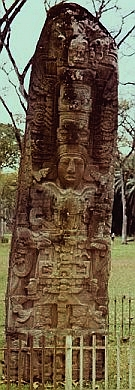
Stela D – North face

There is evidence that Quiriguá was occupied as early as the Late Preclassic (400 BC – AD 200). Although no structures have been securely dated to this period, a number of Late Preclassic artifacts have been recovered, including 63 figurines and a chert blade. Early Classic ceramics from Quiriguá are similar to finds at both Copán and Chalchuapa in El Salvador, while jade hunchback figurines from the same period resemble those found in central Honduras and in the Guatemalan highlands. These early finds demonstrate the participation of Quiriguá in the wider southeastern Maya region from the Late Preclassic onwards.

A combination of hieroglyphic texts from Tikal, Copán and Quiriguá, together with architectural styles and chemical tests of the bones of the founder of the Copán dynasty all suggest that Quiriguá and Copán were founded by elite colonists from the great city of Tikal as a part of its expansion into the southeastern border area of the Maya region. The recorded history of Quiriguá starts in 426, in the Early Classic (c. 200 – c. 600); according to hieroglyphic inscriptions at other sites, on 5 September of that year K'inich Yax K'uk' Mo' was enthroned as king of Copán. Just three days later he installed "Tok Casper", the first known king of Quiriguá, upon the throne. From this it is evident that right from the beginning of its recorded history Quiriguá was subservient to its southern neighbour, and was founded to bring the lucrative trade route of the Motagua River under the control of Copán and, indirectly, of Tikal. During the next few centuries, about which little is known, the ceremonial architecture at Quiriguá was limited to the hilltop Group A and a broad earthen platform on the valley floor. It is recorded that a stela, as yet undiscovered, was erected in 455 by Tutuum Yohl K'inich, the second king of Quiriguá. An early monument records the supervision of a ritual in 480 by the then overlord from Copán, demonstrating Quiriguá's continued status as a vassal of that city. A hieroglyphic text dating to 493 mentions two further kings of Quiriguá, but interruptions in the text make the reading and decipherment of their names particularly difficult.

There are close parallels between the 5th-century architecture and monuments of Quiriguá and Uaxactun in the northern Petén, a site that fell under the domination of Tikal in the late 4th century. The similarities show that Quiriguá remained strongly aligned with the great Tikal alliance network.

=== Hiatus and recovery ===
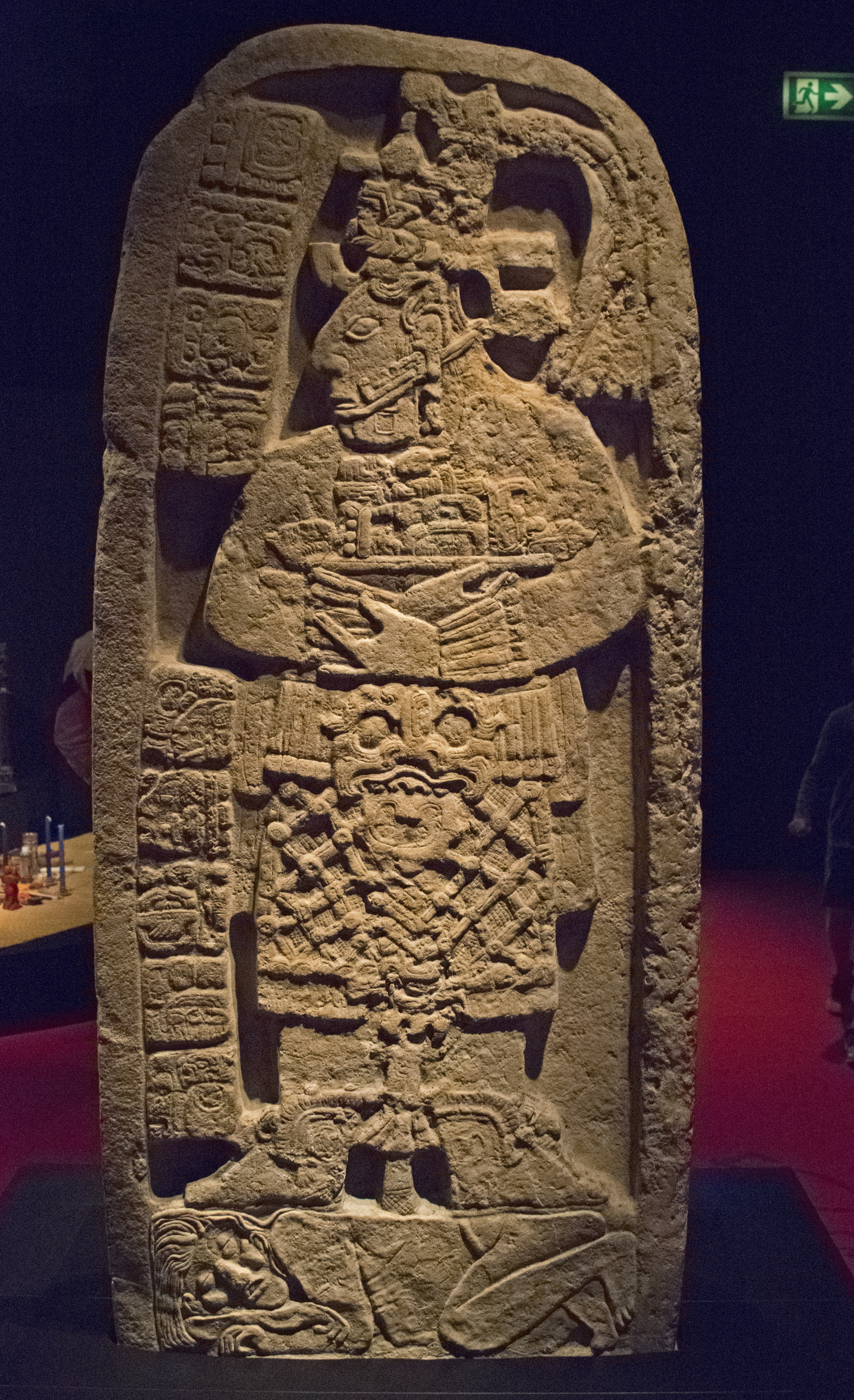
Stela from Quiriguá depicting a queen trampling a captive, ca 653, MUNAE, Guatemala City

Quiriguá suffered a hiatus from the turn of the 6th century that lasted through to the middle of the 7th century. This may be linked to the Tikal hiatus of the Middle Classic caused by Tikal's defeat by Calakmul. There is evidence that Quiriguá suffered an attack by unknown enemies in this period, as demonstrated by the apparently deliberate defacement of Stela U and Monument 26, characteristic of damage inflicted by invading warriors. No monuments were erected during this hiatus, which lasted from 495 to 653.

In the 6th or early 7th century a natural disaster caused a devastating flood of the Motagua Valley and buried the surface of the site under a deep layer of silt, completely changing the landscape. Only those buildings that stood above the mud continued in use, including group A, saved by its hilltop location. The earthen platform on the valley floor also continued in use, at least those parts of it that stood above the silt, and it was one of the site's smaller complexes that grew to become the new centre of Quiriguá, as represented by the monuments visible to this day.

A revival can be identified by the dedication of the first new monument in a century and a half, raised by the otherwise unknown king, K'awiil Yopaat, in 653. Continued contact with Copán is evident, as well as longer distance contacts, possibly with Caracol in Belize. At about the same time major construction work was undertaken in the acropolis, including the building of the site's first ballcourt.

=== Apogee ===
Quiriguá traditionally had been subordinate to its southern neighbour, Copán, and in 724 Uaxaclajuun Ub'aah K'awiil, king of Copán, installed K'ak' Tiliw Chan Yopaat upon Quiriguá's throne as his vassal. As early as 734, however, K'ak' Tiliw Chan Yopaat had shown that he was no longer an obedient subordinate of Copán when he started to refer to himself as k'ul ahaw, holy lord, instead of using the lesser term ahaw, subordinate lord; at the same time he began to use his own Quiriguá emblem glyph. These early assertions of independence can only have been made if Quiriguá had managed to form an external alliance.

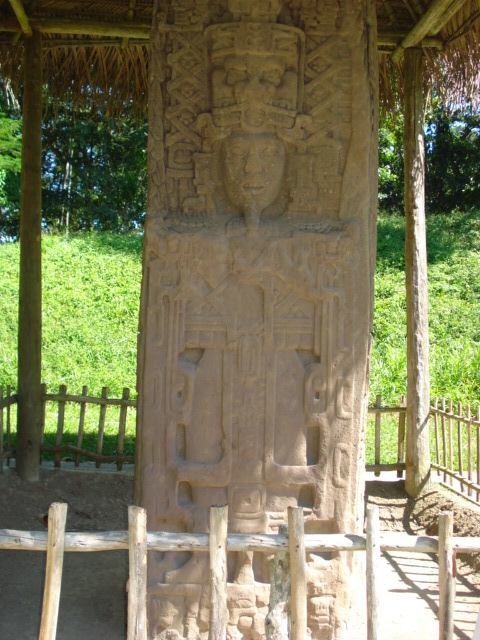
Stela C, south face, representing K'ak' Tiliw Chan Yopaat

Indeed, this local act of rebellion appears to have been part of the larger struggle between the two Maya "superpowers", the great cities of Tikal and Calakmul. In 736, only two years later, K'ak' Tiliw Chan Yopaat received a visit from Wamaw K'awiil, the high king of distant Calakmul, while Copán was one of Tikal's oldest allies. The timing of this visit by the king of Calakmul is highly significant, falling between the accession of K'ak' Tiliw Chan Yopaat to the throne of Quiriguá as a vassal of Copán and the outright rebellion that was to follow. This strongly suggests that Calakmul sponsored Quiriguá's rebellion in order to weaken Tikal and to gain access to the rich trade route of the Motagua Valley. It is likely that contact with Calakmul had been initiated soon after K'ak' Tiliw Chan Yopaat acceded to the throne, since Quiriguá experienced rapid growth soon after, suggesting that Quiriguá already was receiving external support.

In 738 the interlinked fortunes of Quiriguá and Copán took a stunning change of direction when K'ak' Tiliw Chan Yopaat, reigning lord of Quiriguá, captured the powerful, but elderly 13th king of Copán, Uaxaclajuun Ub'aah K'awiil, who had installed him on his throne in 725. This coup does not seem to have affected either Copán or Quiriguá physically, there is no evidence that either city was attacked at this time and the victor seems not to have received any detectable tribute. Quiriguá seems rather to have gained its independence and the control of important trade routes. An inscription at Quiriguá, although difficult to interpret, suggests that the capture took place on 27 April 738, when Quiriguá seized and burned the wooden images of Copán's patron deities. All of this seems to imply that K'ak' Tiliw Chan Yopaat managed to somehow ambush Uaxaclajuun Ub'aah K'awiil, rather than to have defeated him in outright battle. In the Classic Period the statues of Maya deities often were carried into battle on palanquins, facilitating their capture in the event of defeat. It has been suggested that the king of Copán was attempting to attack another site in order to secure captives for sacrifice, and was ambushed by K'ak' Tiliw Chan Yopaat and his Quiriguá warriors.

The captured lord was taken back to Quiriguá and on 3 May 738 he was decapitated in a public ritual. The sacrificial offering of the blood of such a powerful overlord greatly enhanced the standing of Quiriguá and its royal family throughout the region and it proclaimed Quiriguá as the new capital of the south-eastern Maya region. After this, Quiriguá engaged in a major monument-building programme, closely mimicking the sculptural style of Copán, possibly using captured Copán sculptors to carry out the work. The population of Quiriguá and of other sites in the valley rapidly increased after the events of 738, although Quiriguá was always a small centre and its total population probably never exceeded 2,000.

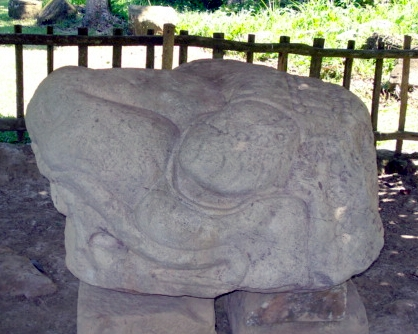
Altar M, dating to 734. It has been identified variously as feline, a crocodile, and a snake. It may be a three-dimensional representation of a rare toponymic glyph.

In the Late Classic (c. 600 – c. 900), alliance with Calakmul frequently was associated with the promise of military support. The fact that Copán, a much more powerful city than Quiriguá, failed to retaliate against its former vassal implies that it feared the military intervention of Calakmul. Calakmul itself was far enough away from Quiriguá that K'ak' Tiliw Chan Yopaat was not afraid of falling directly under its power as a full vassal state, even though it is likely that Calakmul sent warriors to help in the defeat of Copán. The alliance instead seems to have been one of mutual advantage, Calakmul managed to weaken a powerful ally of Tikal while Quiriguá gained its independence.

In 718, the city of Xkuy – an as yet undiscovered site – was attacked and burned by Copán under the leadership of king Uaxaclajuun Ub'aah K'awiil. After the king of Copán was sacrificed in 738, Xkuy seems to have become a loyal vassal of Quiriguá and in 762 K'ak' Tiliw Chan Yopaat supervised the accession of "Sunraiser Jaguar" to the subservient city's throne.

K'ak' Tiliw Chan Yopaat, who had so dramatically changed the destiny of his city, died on 27 July 785. Zoomorph G is his memorial stone and it describes how he was buried 10 days later in the 13 Kawak House, a building that has not been identified. The great king was succeeded by "Sky Xul", a king whose name has not been properly identified. "Sky Xul" became the reigning lord of Quiriguá 78 days after the death of K'ak' Tiliw Chan Yopaat, who is thought to have been his father. His reign lasted from 10 to 15 years and was a period of continued activity. In most of the Maya region cities already were suffering terminal decline, engulfed by the Classic Maya collapse, but in Quiriguá "Sky Xul" dedicated three great zoomorph sculptures and two altars, considered marvels of Maya stoneworking. "Sky Xul" died some time between 795 and 800.

=== Decline and collapse ===
Little is known of "Jade Sky", who succeeded "Sky Xul" and was the last recorded ruler of Quiriguá. The city's power already was waning, as evidenced by the two stunted stelae erected during his reign, which indicate that the kingdom no longer had access to the kind of resources needed to produce monuments of a similar quality to those of his predecessors. "Jade Sky" did build two of the largest structures in the acropolis, however.

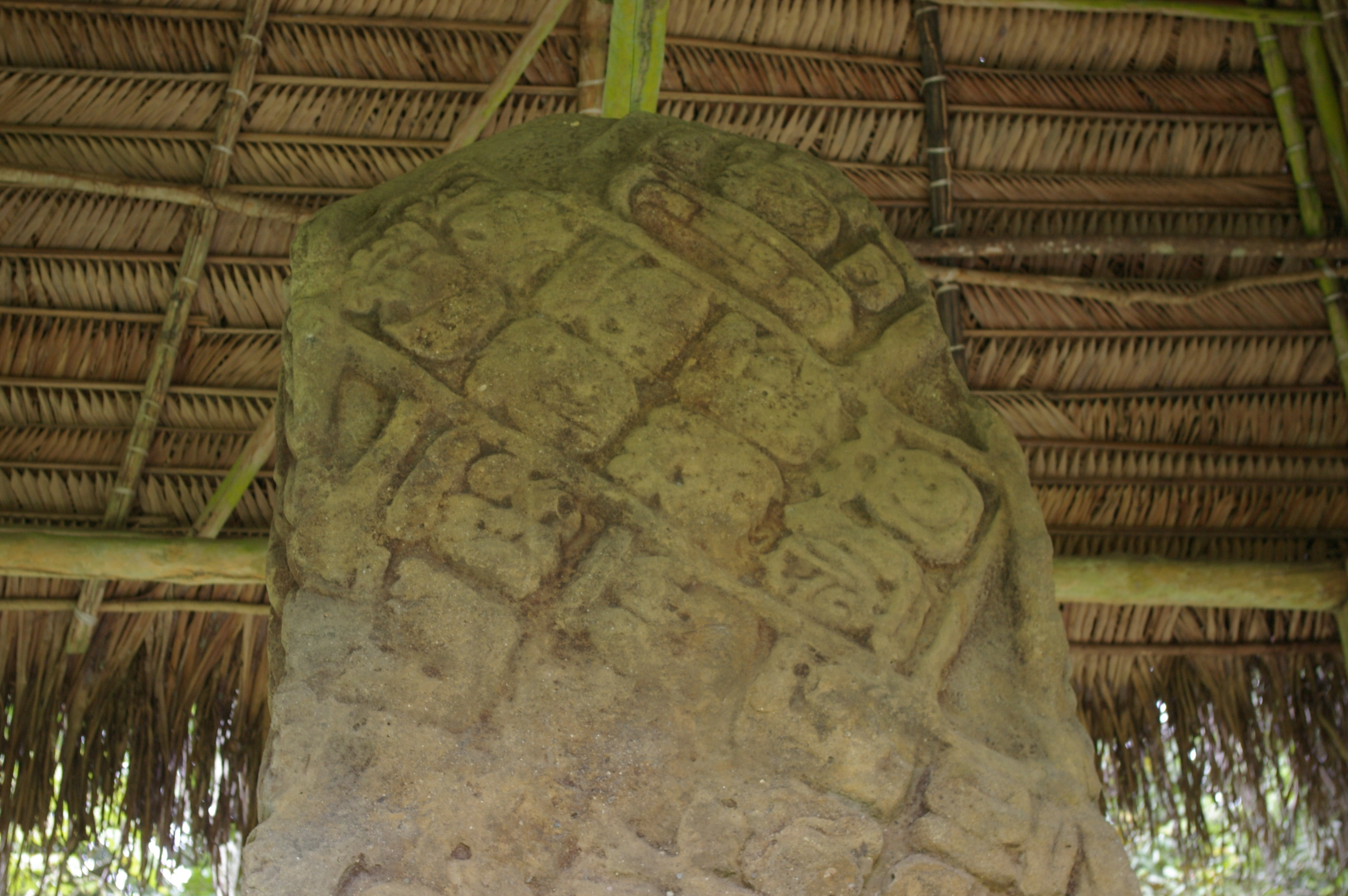
The badly eroded east face of Stela H.

Quiriguá apparently retained its independence from Copán and continued to flourish until the beginning of the 9th century. Relations between the two cities had improved somewhat by 810, when king Yax Pasaj Chan Yopaat of Copán visited Quiriguá in order to carry out a k'atun-ending ritual. However, 810 was also the year when the last hieroglyphic texts were raised at Quiriguá, although a reduced level of construction continued in the city centre. After this, Quiriguá falls into silence, engulfed by the greater phenomenon of the Classic Maya collapse – it had lost its reason for existence when trade no longer flowed along the Motagua; within a few years Quiriguá was all but deserted and sites throughout the Motagua Valley suffered severe decline or abandonment.

=== Postclassic ===
In the early Postclassic Period (c. 900 – c. 1200), Quiriguá was occupied by peoples closely linked to the Caribbean coastal areas of the Yucatán Peninsula and Belize, perhaps due to Chontal Maya control of a trade network that included the Yucatán coast and the Motagua Valley. During their brief reoccupation of the site they made substantial additions to the acropolis complex. Finds associated with their occupation include a reclining chacmool sculpture and ceramics from the east coast of Yucatán, artifacts that demonstrate a close link with the distant city of Chichen Itza. Some copper bells and ornaments were recovered from Quiriguá, they are among the earliest finds of metal artifacts in the Maya area. They have been dated to either the Terminal Classic (c. 800 – c. 950) or the Early Postclassic.

=== Modern history ===
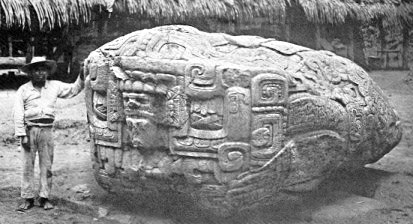
Zoomorph B – photo by Maudslay

The first European visitor to publish an account of Quiriguá was English architect and artist Frederick Catherwood, who reached the ruins in 1840. The previous landowner, by the surname of Payés, had related the existence of the ruins to his sons and to Carlos Meiney, a Jamaican Englishman resident in Guatemala. The elder Payés had recently died and passed the land to his sons and, since neither Meiney nor Payés' sons had visited the land containing the ruins, they invited John Lloyd Stephens and Catherwood to join them on their first trip to the site. Stephens had other duties to attend to, but Catherwood was able to accompany the Payés brothers to Quiriguá. Due to adverse conditions he was only able to stay a short time at the ruins, but made drawings of two of the stelae, which were published with a short account of Catherwood's visit in John Lloyd Stephens's book Incidents of Travel in Central America, Chiapas, and Yucatan in 1841. Quiriguá was the first site that Stephens and Catherwood could claim to have discovered themselves. A longer account of the ruins was made in 1854 by Karl Scherzer.

Explorer and archaeologist Alfred Maudslay visited Quiriguá for three days in 1881; they were the first pre-Columbian ruins that he saw and they were sufficiently impressive to inspire him to take up a permanent interest in Central American archaeology. He was able to return on three further occasions, the last being in 1894, and he made the first efforts to clear the monuments before recording them. He carried out a very thorough examination and made a photographic record of all visible monuments, carried out some minor excavations, made paper and plaster molds of the hieroglyphic inscriptions and surveyed the principal sculptures; these molds were then shipped to the Victoria and Albert Museum, with casts being transferred to the British Museum.

In 1910, the United Fruit Company bought Quiriguá and all the land for a great distance around the site for banana production; they set aside 75 acres (30 ha) around the ceremonial centre as an archaeological park, leaving an island of jungle among the plantations. More archaeological work was carried out from 1910 to 1914 by Edgar Lee Hewett and Sylvanus Morley for the School of American Archaeology in Santa Fe. Duplicates of the stelae of Quiriguá made from Hewett's plaster casts of the originals were exhibited at the Panama–California Exposition in San Diego, California, in 1915. The casts are still on display at the San Diego Museum of Us in their "Maya: Heart of Sky, Heart of Earth" exhibition. The Carnegie Institution conducted several intermittent projects at Quiriguá from 1915 through 1934. Aldous Huxley, writing after visiting the site in the early 1930s, noted that Quiriguá's stelae commemorated "man's triumph over time and matter and the triumph of time and matter over man." Quiriguá was among the first Maya archaeological sites to be studied intensively, although little restoration was carried out and the ruins once again became overgrown with jungle.

Quiriguá was declared a National Monument in 1970 under Ministerial Accord 1210, this was followed on 19 June 1974 by its declaration as an Archaeological Park under Governmental Accord 35-74.

From 1974 through 1979, an extensive archaeological project was conducted at Quiriguá sponsored by the University of Pennsylvania, the National Geographic Society, and the Guatemalan Instituto de Antropología e Historia. Directed by Robert Sharer and William R. Coe, the project excavated the acropolis, cleaned the monuments, and studied outlying groups. It was declared a UNESCO World Heritage Site in 1981, and in 1999 UNESCO approved one-off funding of US$27,248 for "emergency assistance for the rehabilitation of the archaeological site of Quiriguá". One of the site's stelae is depicted on the Guatemalan 10 centavo coin.

The 34-hectare (84-acre) area included within the Archaeological Park of Quiriguá has been developed for tourism with the construction of a car park, site museum, and sanitation facilities and is open to the public on a daily basis.

== The site ==
=== Architecture ===
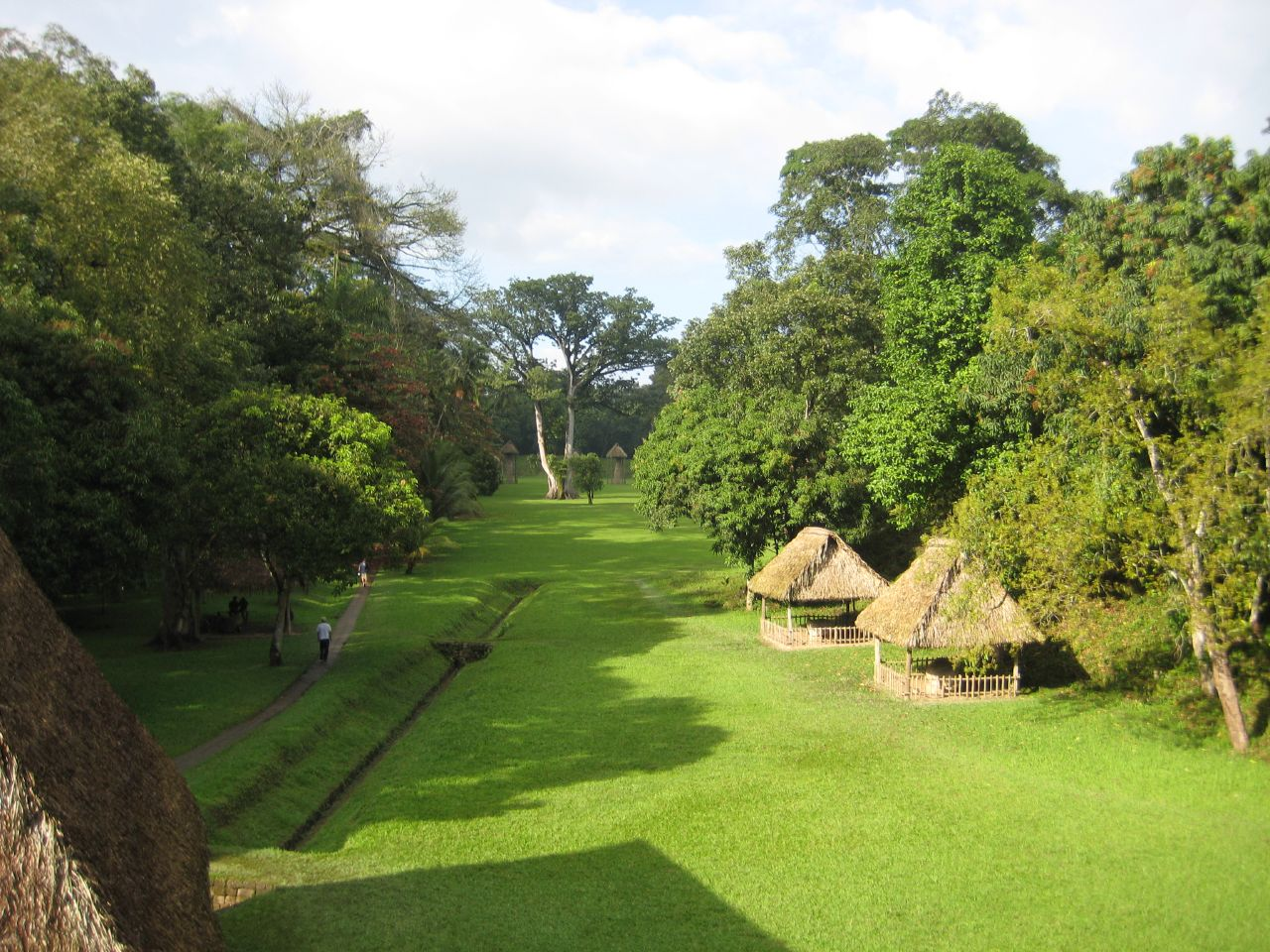
The Great Plaza of Quiriguá, originally laid out by K'ak' Tiliw Chan Yopaat; view is from the acropolis looking north

After Quiriguá's pivotal victory over Copán in 738, K'ak' Tiliw Chan Yopaat rebuilt the main group in the image of Copán itself. Thus, the acropolis, palace, and ballcourt all lie at the southern end of the Great Plaza. The ceremonial centre is laid out around three plazas, the northernmost is the Great Plaza. This plaza measures 325 m (1,066 ft) from north to south and is the largest plaza in the whole Maya region. At the southern end of the Great Plaza is the Ballcourt Plaza, surrounded on three sides by structures associated with the acropolis. The Acropolis Plaza is a fully enclosed plaza within the acropolis itself. The area to the west of the Ballcourt Plaza was probably the riverside docking area and there is evidence that the southern part of the Great Plaza was a marketplace. A number of ceramic-lined wells have been excavated close to the site core, these were all built in the 8th century and although some continued in use into the 9th century, none are known to have been built that late.

- 1A-1 is an enormous platform forming the northern part of the Great Plaza. It measures 100 by 85 metres (328 by 279 ft) and rises 0.5 metres (20 in) above the level of the southern part of the plaza. It forms the northern portion of the Great Plaza, being built by K'ak' Tiliw Chan Yopaat when he extended the plaza northward. The platform was built from river cobbles and was paved with stone slabs. Platform 1A-1 supported the stelae A, C, D, E and F and Zoomorph B. The platform was built in two phases over about 20 years.
- 1A-3 is a large mound marking the northern edge of the Great Plaza. It originally measured 82.5 by 20 metres (271 by 66 ft) and was 7 metres (23 ft) high. A 63-metre (207 ft) wide stairway climbed the southern face of the structure from the plaza. The structure was later extended to the north but this second phase of construction was never finished.
- The acropolis is the largest architectural complex at Quiriguá, it lies at the southern limit of the ceremonial centre of the city. It is a complex construction, with new buildings and features being added over time. Construction of the acropolis began in 550 and continued through to 810 when the site was abandoned. The acropolis was a palace complex used primarily as an elite residence and for administrative purposes. The acropolis complex includes structures 1B-1, 1B-2, 1B-3, 1B-4, 1B-5 and 1B-6. Excavations of the acropolis encountered the fallen remains of corbel arches, but none are still standing.
- 1B-sub.1 is also known as the K'inich Ahau Wall. It was a free-standing wall over 23 metres (75 ft) long and 1.5 metres (5 ft) thick, it stood on top of the western platform of the acropolis. The western side of the wall overlooked the river and bore five alternating mosaic masks representing solar deities and serpents with human arms. These masks were supported by a frieze consisting of two concentric ovals flanked by serpent heads. The wall was completed around 750, during the reign of K'ak' Tiliw Chan Yopaat.
- 1B-sub.4 Excavations at the acropolis discovered a completely buried ballcourt under the structures on the western side of the Acropolis Plaza, a rare example of a ballcourt having been built over by subsequent construction, in this case by K'ak' Tiliw Chan Yopaat. This was the first ballcourt at the site and dates to the middle of the 7th century. It was built with blocks of rhyolite. This ballcourt is a close copy of the ballcourts at Copán, being built in the same style, to the same dimensions, and with the same orientation. The ballcourt was buried when K'ak' Tiliw Chan Yopaat built the massive western platform to restrict access to the acropolis.

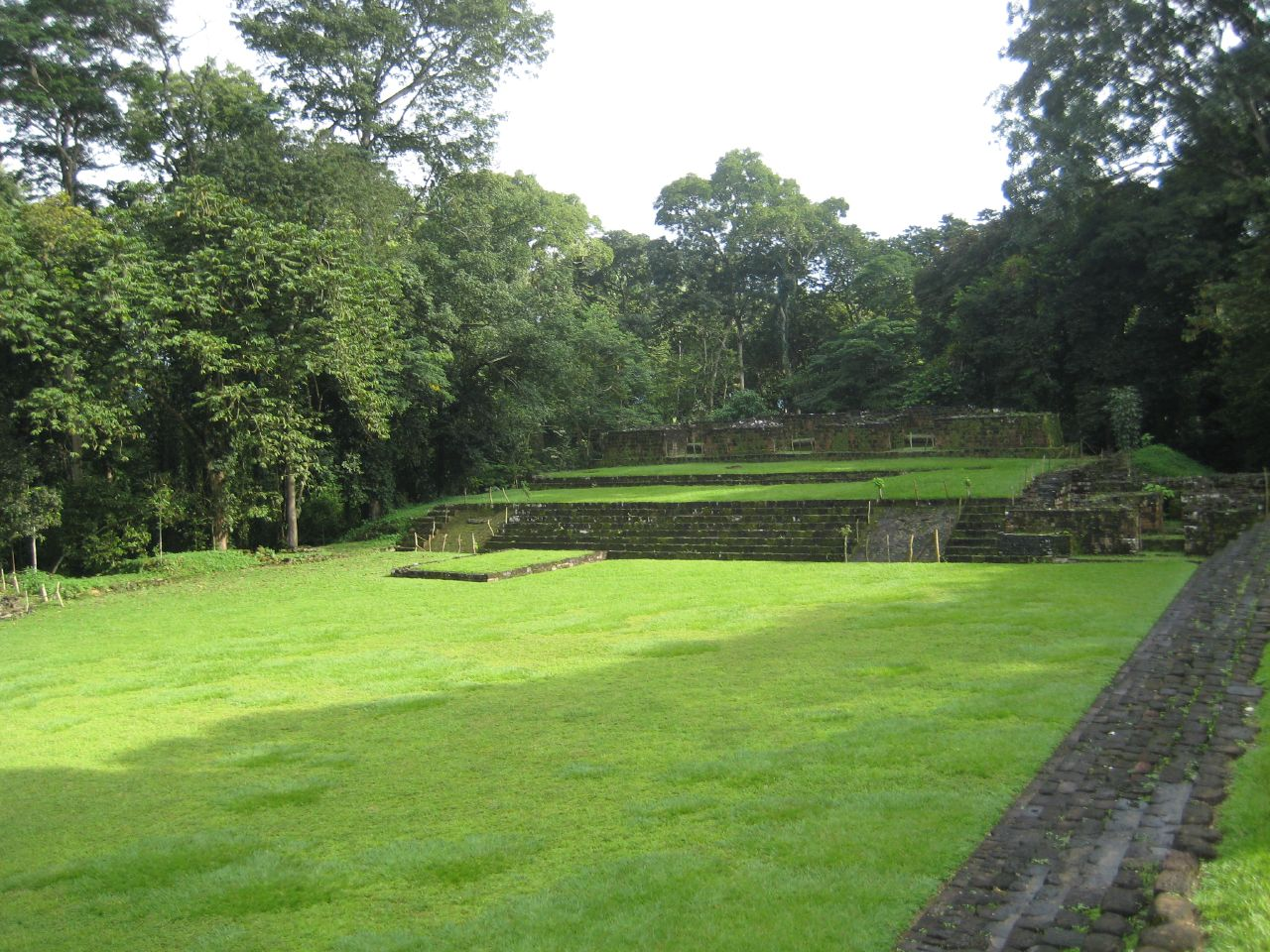
View of the acropolis across the Ballcourt Plaza

- 1B-1 is a structure which forms the southern limit of the Acropolis Plaza, a broad stairway leads down to the plaza from the northern side of the building. The lower walls of the structure are still standing and it has three entrances, each of which opens onto a small chamber. Each of the three chambers has a hieroglyphic step on the back wall leading to another small chamber. Originally the building had an external band of hieroglyphs. Both the exterior and internal glyphs bear the last known date recorded at Quiriguá, falling in June 810. This building was built during the reign of "Jade Sky".
- 1B-2 also lies south of the Acropolis Plaza, in the southwest corner. It is smaller than structure 1B-1, which it adjoins, and its lower walls also are still standing. It was a small residential building that was elaborately decorated with sculptured stonework. This structure was probably the residence of K'ak' Tiliw Chan Yopaat.
- 1B-3 and 1B-4 are structures on the west side of the Acropolis Plaza, only the lower walls remain. Between these two structures is an older free-standing wall. This wall has a westward facing mosaic frieze that bears damaged and now headless depictions of Kinich Ahau, the sun god.
- 1B-5 lies to the north of the Acropolis Plaza, at the south-eastern corner of the Ballcourt Plaza. This structure was accessed via a broad stairway from the Acropolis Plaza to the south, which rises to a single entrance opening onto seven interconnected chambers. This is the largest building at Quiriguá and its walls are still standing. It was built during the reign of "Jade Sky".
- 1B-6 lies to the east of the Acropolis Plaza and contained an ancestral shrine, reflecting a long established tradition first seen at Tikal. Located under the building was a tomb lined with slabs of schist, which contained an elite burial. The remains probably belonged to a male, the teeth were inlaid with jade, and a bead of the same material had been placed in the mouth. Associated ceramic offerings date this tomb to the Early Classic.
- 1B-7 is a ballcourt, built by K'ak' Tiliw Chan Yopaat to replace the ballcourt buried under his expansion of the acropolis. The ballcourt lies in the Ballcourt Plaza, to which it gives its name, to the northwest of the acropolis. The ballcourt has an east–west orientation that is unusual in the Maya region, where ballcourts traditionally are aligned north–south.

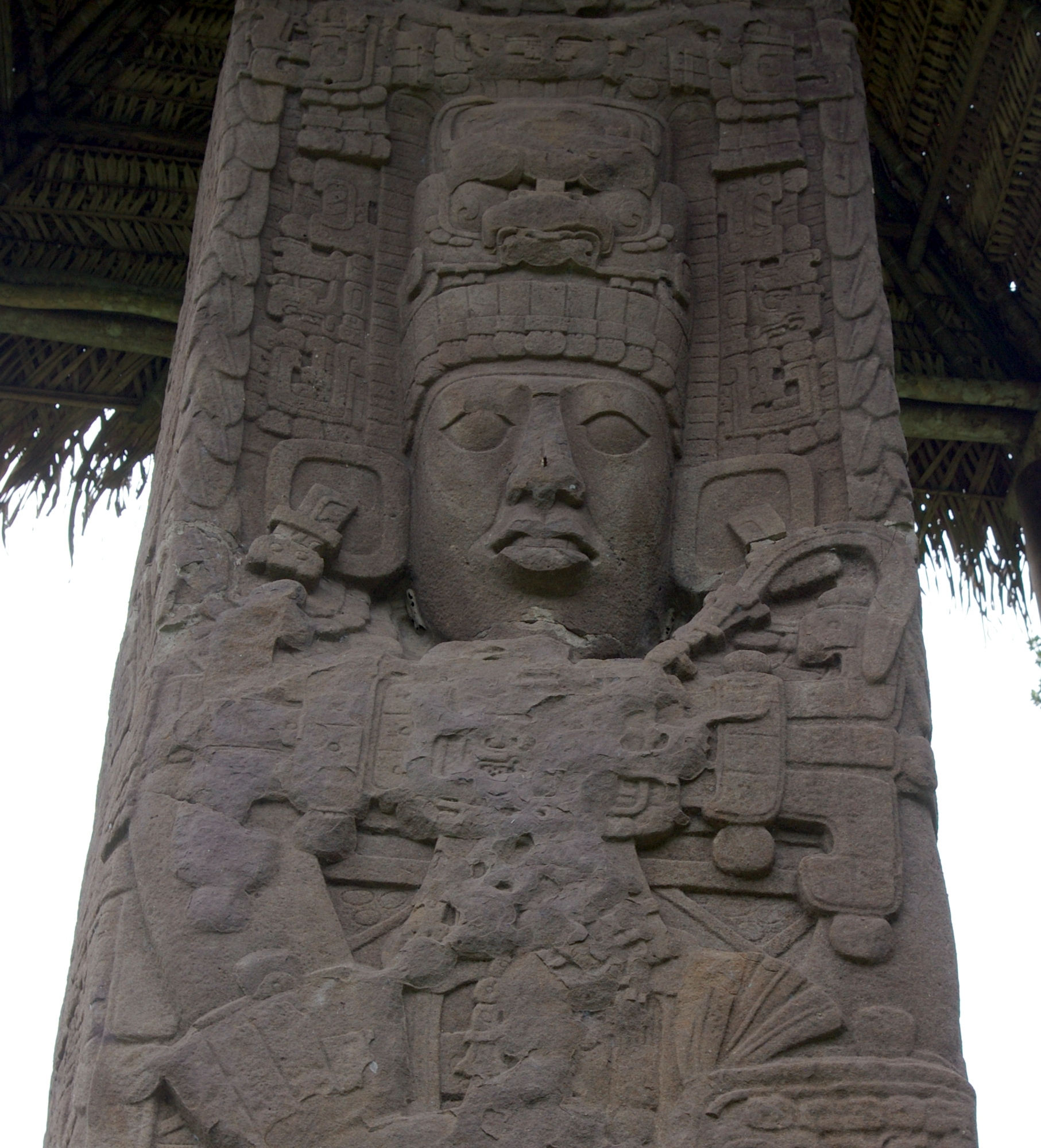
Detail of the north face of Stela E, depicting K'ak' Tiliw Chan Yopaat holding a God K sceptre

- 3C-1 is a broad earthen platform on the valley floor, it dates to the middle of the Classic Period and is one of the earlier constructions at the site, parts of it continuing in use after a catastrophic flood.
- 3C-7 is a group dating to the Early Classic. It is on the floodplain some distance to the north of the acropolis.
- 3C-8 is another Early Classic group located to the north of the acropolis.
- Locus 011 and Locus 057 may have been watchposts, they were situated at the points where the Quiriguá and the Jubuco rivers entered the Motagua Valley and may have been used to control passing traffic on these routes. Locus 057 was situated on one of the most probable routes to Copán and may have been a watchpost to look out for enemy warriors after the defeat of Copán by K'ak' Tiliw Chan Yopaat.
- Locus 122 and Locus 123 are groups located on the floodplain south of the river. Locus 122, although unexcavated, is a compound consisting of a pyramidal mound and a NE–SW oriented plaza, similar to some Preclassic complexes in the highlands, for which reason it is presumed to date from that period.

Groups A, B and C lie at a distance of 1.5–5 kilometres (1–3 mi) from the site core.

- Group A is a hilltop complex roughly dating to the early Classic Period. A stela found in this group dates to 493.
- Group B, also known as Group 7A-1, is to the north of the site core. It is the location of the badly eroded Stela S, which was moved here from the Great Plaza in ancient times.
- Group C has an unsculptured stela.

=== Monuments ===
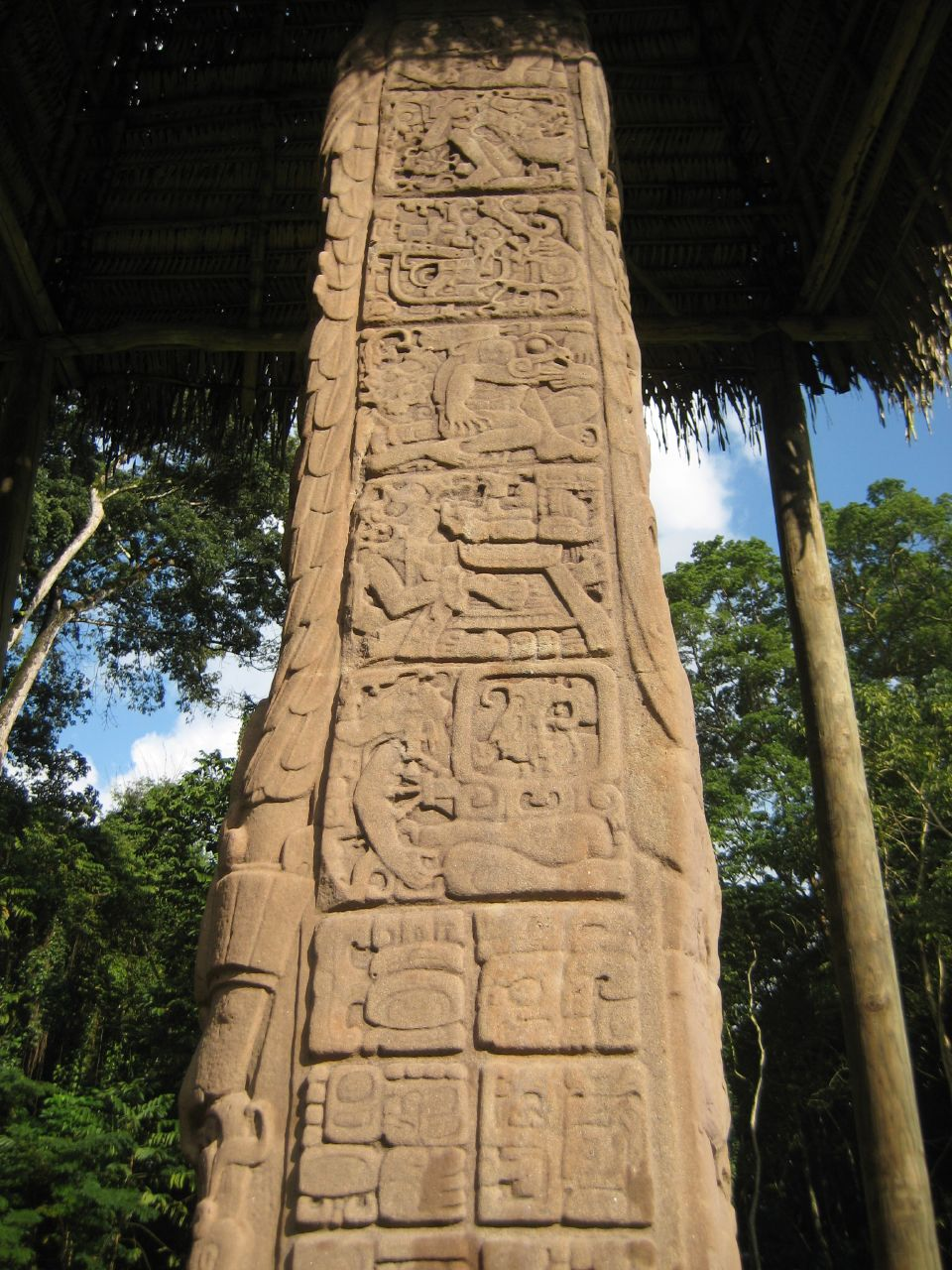
Elaborate full-figure hieroglyphs on the west side of Quiriguá Stela D

The monuments at Quiriguá include unusually large stelae elaborately carved from single blocks of red sandstone, brought from quarries 5 kilometres (3 mi) away. The characteristics of this hard rock allowed the local sculptors to produce low-relief sculptures enhanced by three-dimensional faces, in contrast with the contemporary two-dimensional sculpture of the Petén region. After the defeat and execution of the king of Copán in 738, the sculptural style of Quiriguá closely resembled that of its former overlord. The enormous stelae at Quirigá originally would have been visible from the Motagua River, which once flowed past the west side of the Great Plaza, announcing the new-found power of the city to passing traders. The monuments include long panels of glyphic text that are considered among the most complex and beautiful of all Maya stone inscriptions. A characteristic of these texts is the use of full-figure glyphs in which the normal bar and dot number glyphs of Maya script are replaced with exquisitely carved representations of the deities. However, by the latter part of the 8th century Quiriguá had developed an original style with the production of boulders elaborately sculpted into the forms of composite mythological animals bearing elements of toads, jaguars, crocodiles, and birds of prey; these sculptures are referred to as zoomorphs and were completed by two later kings after the death of K'ak' Tiliw Chan Yopaat in 785.

There also are various altars and sculptures used as decoration in the facades of buildings; most Quiriguá monuments have a grand formal monumentality that is rather stiff compared to the naturalistic grace of the art of some other Maya sites. Traces of red pigment have been found on some of the monuments and most of the monuments were likely to have been painted red, the colour of birth, sacrifice, and renewal.

The epigraphic record carved across the monoliths of Quiriguá details crucial dynastic titles, mythological creation dates, and political declarations of sovereignty as follows:

- Emblem Glyph & Toponymy:
  - Emblem Glyph: Read phonetically as K'uhul Un Ajaw ("Divine Lord of Amate/Paper"), signifying the royal lineage's sacred authority over the Motagua trade corridor.
  - Primordial Toponym: Recorded on monuments as Ihk' Way Nal ("Black Hole/Cenote Place"), a mythical location replicated by K'ak' Tiliw Chan Yopaat in the design of the Great Plaza.
- Royal Titles & Epigraphic Epithets:
  - K'uhul Ajaw ("Holy Lord"): Title first claimed by K'ak' Tiliw Chan Yopaat on Altar M (AD 734) to declare independence from the hegemony of Copán.
  - Nohol Kalomte ("Quiebra-lanzas del Sur" / "Overlord of the South"): Military title recorded on Stela J (AD 756) asserting regional dominance following the capture of Copán's ruler.
- Cosmological & Historical Inscriptions:
  - Creation Date Record (Stela C): Features the Long Count date 13.0.0.0.0 4 Ahaw 8 Kumk'u (13 August 3114 BC), marking the mythical origin of the present creation era.
  - Full-Figure Glyphic Variants (Stela D & Zoomorph B): Elaborate anthropomorphic and zoomorphic glyphs substituting standard bar-and-dot numerical notation with portraits of deities.

- Stela A was erected in 775 by K'ak' Tiliw Chan Yopaat. Stela A and Stela C form a pair and were both dedicated on 29 December 775.
- Zoomorph B was dedicated in 780 by K'ak' Tiliw Chan Yopaat, it is a multi-ton boulder sculptured into a half-crocodile half-mountain beast. The hieroglyphic text on this monument consists entirely of full-figure glyphs. Traces of red pigment have been found on this zoomorph, which is 4 metres (13 ft) long. A dedication cache was found buried in a pit under Zoomorph B, it included seven flint blades between 14 and 46 cm (5.5 and 18.1 in) in length.
- Stela C was erected in 775 by K'ak' Tiliw Chan Yopaat. The hieroglyphic text contains references to 455 and Tutuum Yohl K'inich, an early king. The stela also bears a reference to the date 13.0.0.0.0 4 Ahaw 8 Kumk'u (13 August 3114 BC). This date is recorded throughout the entire Maya area as the beginning of the current creation, when the deities were placed in order. Stela C forms a pair with Stela A and was dedicated on the same date.
- Stela D dates to 766, during the reign of K'ak' Tiliw Chan Yopaat. It is distinguished by the relatively rare, extravagant, full-figure anthropomorphic versions of Maya hieroglyphics on the upper parts of its sides, which are particularly well preserved. Stela D is roughly 6 metres (20 ft) in height.

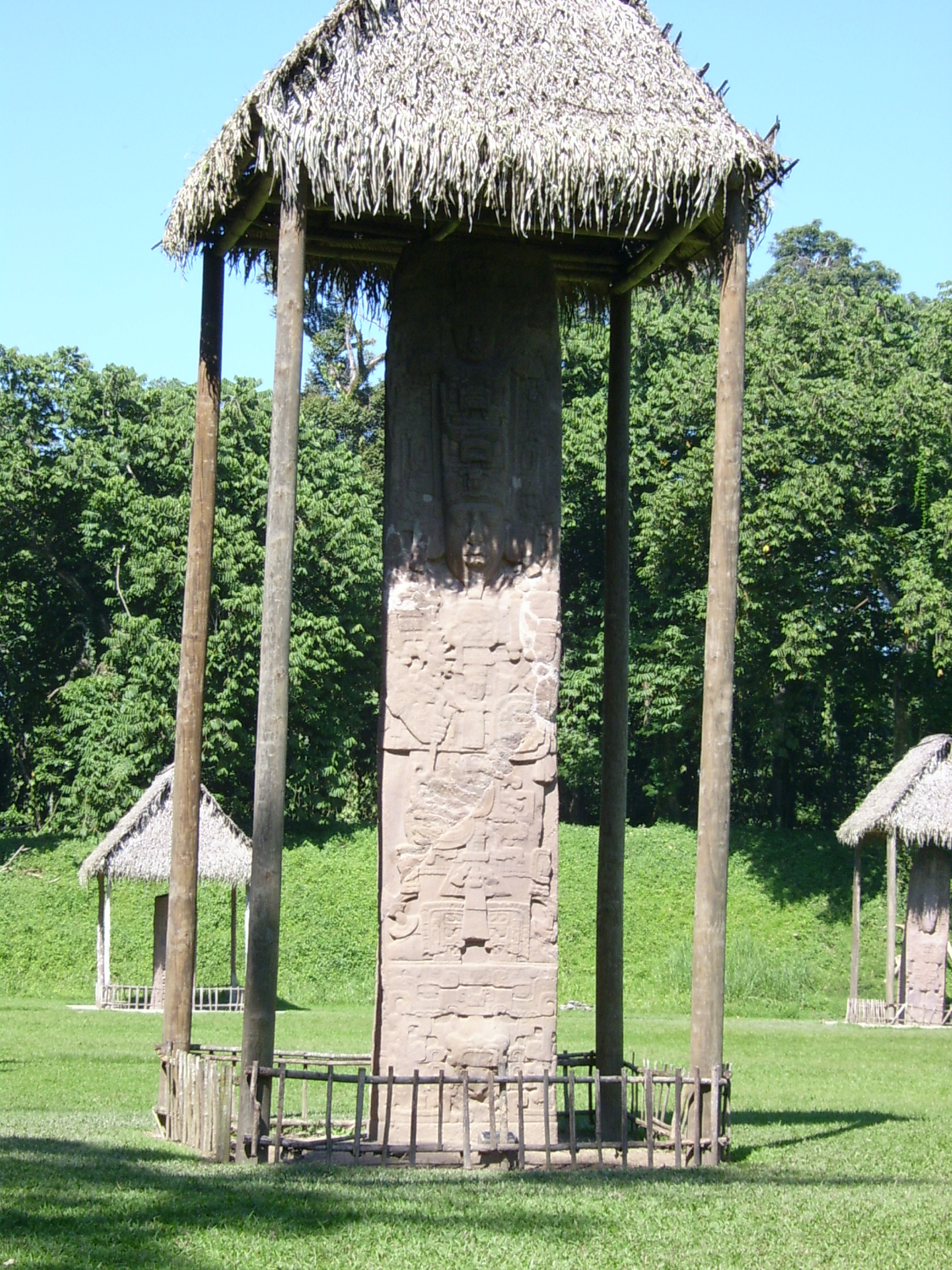
Stela E at Quiriguá, possibly the largest freestanding stone monument in the New World

- Stela E stands in the northern half of the Great Plaza. This stela was dedicated on 24 January 771 by K'ak' Tiliw Chan Yopaat. Its total shaft measures 10.6 metres (35 ft) in height, including the buried portion holding it in place, which measures just under 3 metres (10 ft). This enormous monolith is the largest stone ever quarried by the ancient Maya and weighs approximately 65 tons, it may even be the largest free-standing worked monolith in the New World. In 1917 this stela, already tilting away from vertical, finally fell over completely after heavy rains, although it remained unbroken. In 1934 an attempt was made to raise the stela using a winch and steel cables, during which the cables snapped and the monolith fell and was broken into two pieces, which have since been joined back together using concrete. This stela bears portraits of K'ak' Tiliw Chan Yopaat on its front and back.
- Stela F is an enormous 7.3-metre (24 ft) high monolith carved from sandstone. It bears representations of K'ak' Tiliw Chan Yopaat on its north and south sides and hieroglyphic inscriptions on its east and west sides. It dates to 761 and when it was raised it was the tallest monument ever erected by the Maya; it was only surpassed when Stela E was erected 10 years later.
- Zoomorph G is the memorial monument to K'ak' Tiliw Chan Yopaat, dedicated during the reign of "Sky Xul". It shows the face of the dead king emerging from the maw of an enormous jaguar. The text of this monument describes the death and burial of Quiriguá's greatest king.
- Stela H dates to 751, during the reign of K'ak' Tiliw Chan Yopaat. Its glyphs are arranged in a rare mat pattern, copied from Copán. The stela is executed in the wrap-around style. A flint blade was found buried under the stela butt, buried as an offering when the stela was dedicated. The hieroglyphic inscriptions on Stela H are badly damaged.
- Stela J was erected by K'ak' Tiliw Chan Yopaat in 756 and is carved in the wrap-around style. It stands 5 metres (16 ft) high and is located in the southern part of the Great Plaza. The dedicatory cache consisted of a house-shaped clay box with unknown contents.
- Altar L is fairly crudely worked and dates to 653. The text bears the name of king K'awiil Yopaat and also mentions "Smoke Imix", the 12th king of Copán. The altar is a rhyolite disk 1 metre (39 in) in diameter and 0.25 metres (10 in) thick. The sculptural style of this altar is unique, and shows affinities with the distant site of Caracol in Belize.
- Altar M this modest monument is the earliest known monument dedicated by K'ak' Tiliw Chan Yopaat. The importance of this monument lies in its text, in which this preeminent king of Quiriguá claimed the title of k'uhul ajaw, holy lord, and began his bid for independence from Copán. This rhyolite sculpture was dedicated on 15 September 734 and has the form of a monstrous head, possibly that of a crocodilian.
- Altar N is another small rhyolite sculpture stylistically similar to Altar M. This sculpture has the form of a turtle shell with a skeletal head with a mirror on its forehead emerging sideways from one end and an elderly figure from the other. This is a representation of the bicephalic deity Pawatun (God N), a prominent underworld deity.
- Zoomorph O is a crocodile-mountain hybrid monster, dedicated in 790 by king "Sky Xul". It is accompanied by an altar depicting a lightning god. It is located in the Ballcourt Plaza, just south of the ballcourt itself.
- Zoomorph P (which explorer Maudslay nicknamed The Great Turtle) was dedicated in 795 by "Sky Xul" and is a masterpiece of Mesoamerican art. It weighs around 20 tons. On one side it depicts a larger-than-life portrait of "Sky Xul" himself seated cross-legged in the open jaws of an enormous crocodile-mountain hybrid monster. The design of this zoomorph is incredibly intricate and the whole monument is covered with skilfully executed sculpture. It is located in the Ballcourt Plaza, just south of the ballcourt. Zoomorph P is accompanied by an altar depicting an unidentified deity leaping from a split in the earth. A hieroglyphic text on the zoomorph describes the founding of Quiriguá under the supervision of the king of Copán. Traces of red pigment have been found on this monument, suggesting that it was originally painted red.

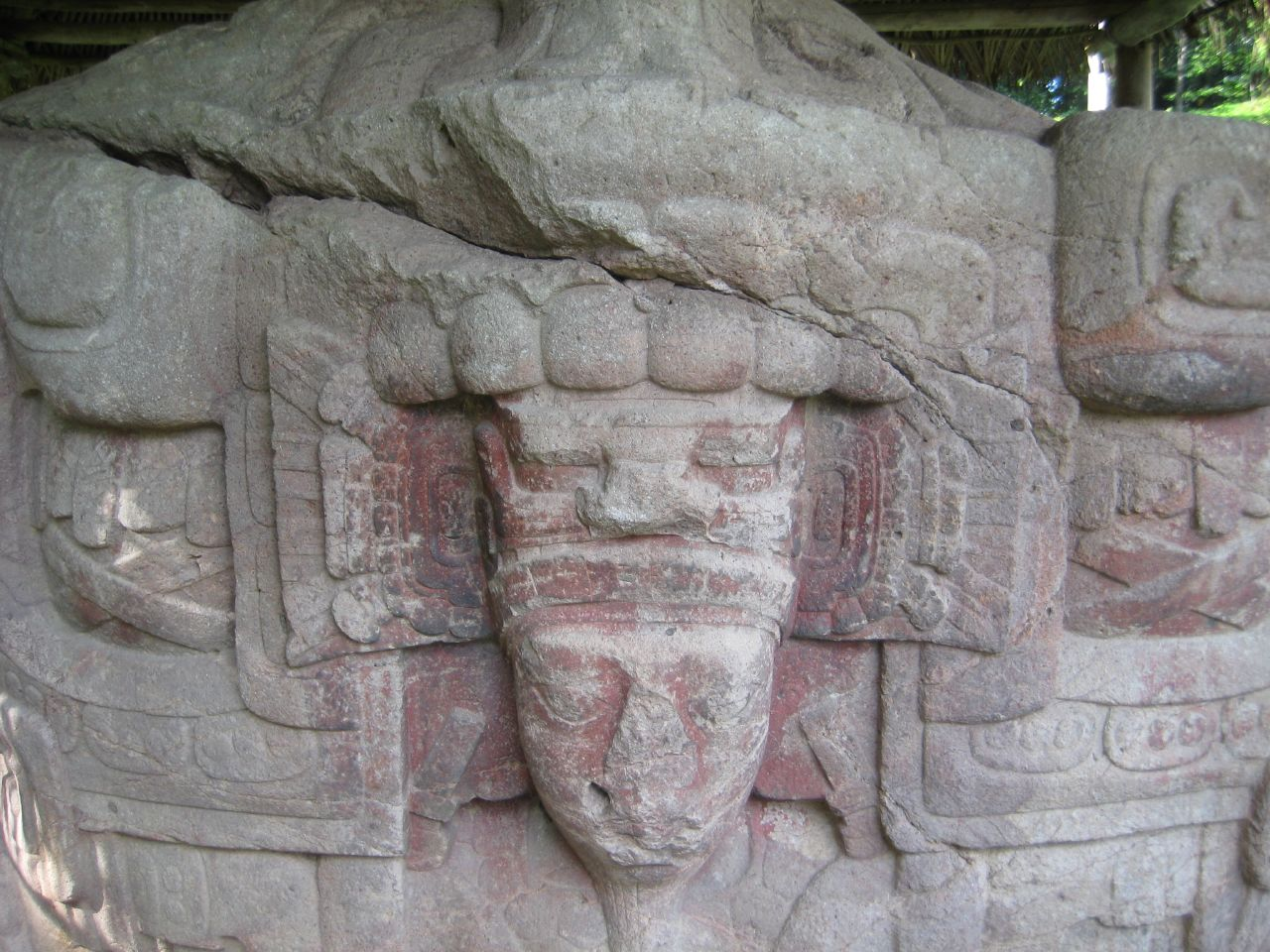
Detail from Zoomorph B, dedicated in 780 by K'ak' Tiliw Chan Yopaat

- Altar Q and Altar R are two small rhyolite disks that probably served as ballcourt markers for the earliest ballcourt, the buried Structure 1B-sub.4. Together with a third stone they would have marked the central axis of the ballcourt. They both bear seated cross-legged figures carved in shallow relief.
- Stela S is the earliest surviving monument of K'ak' Tiliw Chan Yopaat, it dates to 746. It was originally located in the northern half of the Great Plaza but was moved to an outlying group in ancient times. It is heavily eroded, some of the damage may have been inflicted by the process of moving it. It was fashioned from sandstone and bears the figure of K'ak' Tiliw Chan Yopaat on the front, the other three sides being covered by hieroglyphic text. Unfortunately, due to the heavy erosion most of the text is illegible. Stela S is 2.8 metres (9 ft) high (not including the part of the stela buried in the ground) and the dimensions of the base are 1.6 metres (5.2 ft) by 1.2 metres (3.9 ft), making it the earliest of the huge stelae that were to characterise Quiriguá, although it is significantly smaller than those that were to follow.
- Stela T was dedicated in 692 by an unknown ruler. It is a badly eroded schist sculpture bearing mostly unreadable glyphs accompanying a poorly preserved figure. The stela is conservative in style, being similar to the much older Stela U.
- Stela U comes from Group A and bears a heavily eroded portrait of a king in wrap-around style (extending over three sides of the stela). This style originated in Tikal and indicates contact with the central Petén region. This stela has an identifiable date, corresponding to 18 April 480, and a reference to a ritual taking place that was supervised by the king of Copán. This stela is carved from schist and is broken in two pieces, being snapped off at the knees – apparently deliberately during an attack by unknown enemies. It was originally 2.7 metres (9 ft) in height.
- Monument 25 is a plain round column carved from schist. It is about 2.5 metres (8 ft) long and 0.6 metres (2 ft) in diameter. It was found in Locus 011.
- Monument 26 is a stela in wrap-around style found close to structure 3C-1. A date corresponding to 493 is contained in the hieroglyphic text on its back, this text mentions the third and fourth rulers of Quiriguá but their names are currently unreadable. It is carved from schist and was originally 2 metres (6.6 ft) high but the stela was broken in ancient times, apparently deliberately. It was broken off at the knees and the left eye of the ruler's portrait was scratched away, damage characteristic of that inflicted by invading warriors. Only two pieces have been recovered, an upper section measuring 1 metre (3.3 ft) and a lower section measuring 0.6 metres (2 ft).
- Monument 29 and Monument 30 are heavily eroded columnar sculptures fashioned from schist, each measuring a little over 1 m in length. They were found together in a modern drainage ditch to the north and northwest of the ceremonial centre of Quiriguá. They apparently were sculptures of anthropomorphs or monkeys standing on pedestals with their hands clasped on their chests. It is thought on stylistic grounds that these two monuments date to the Late Preclassic.

== See also ==
- El Puente
- List of megalithic sites
- Manche Ch'ol
- Yopaat
