= Kʼakʼ Tiliw Chan Yopaat =

King of Quiriguá from 724 to 785

- Ajaw
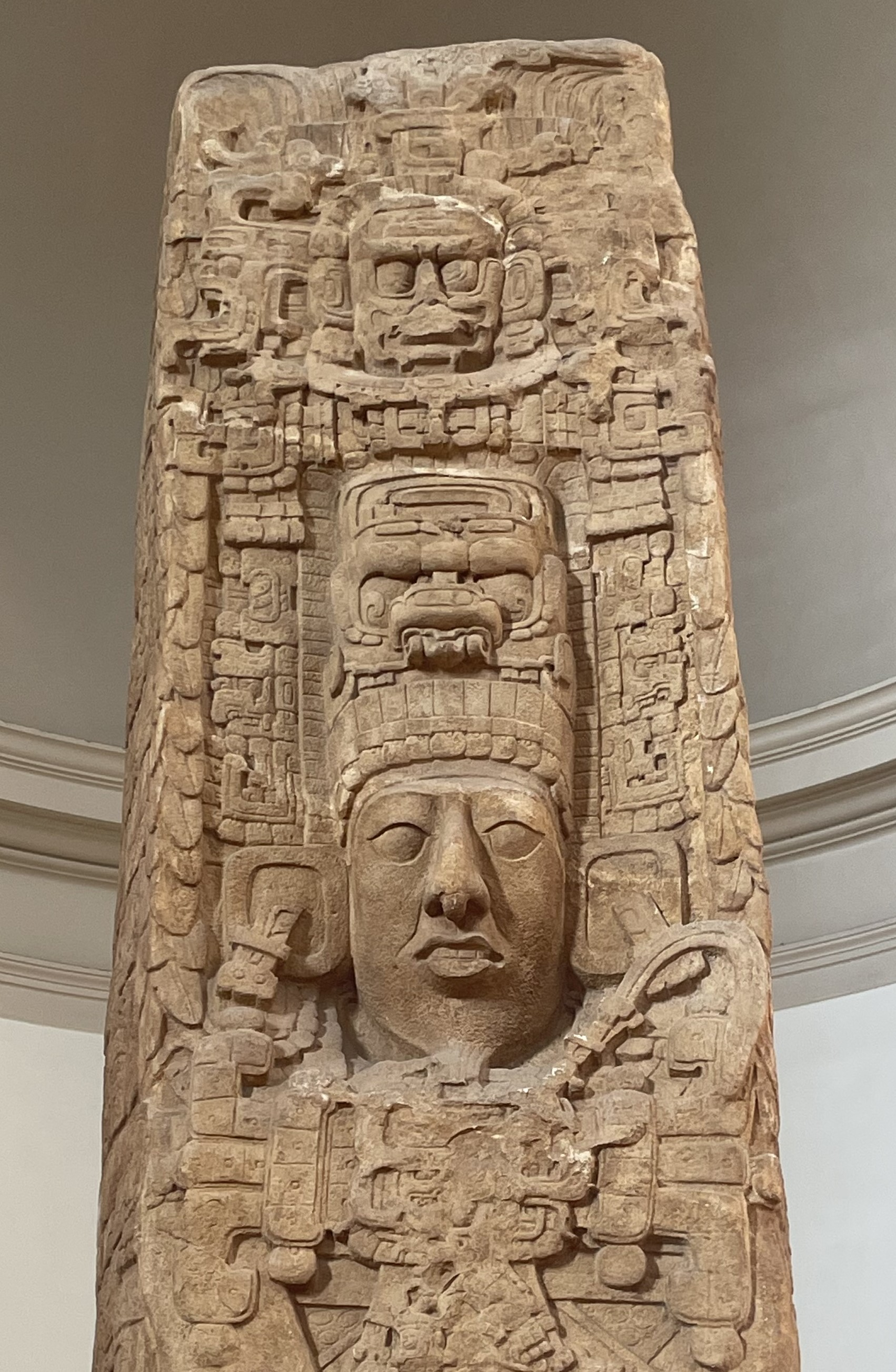
- Kʼakʼ Tiliw Chan Yopaat as depicted on Stela E at Quiriguá

King of Quiriguá
- Reign: 29 December 724 - 27 July 785
- Predecessor: Unknown (Last known ruler: K'awiil Yopaat)
- Successor: Sky Xul
- Born: c. 690; Quiriguá
- Died: 31 July 785 (aged 94–95); Quiriguá
- Issue: Sky Xul (possibly)
- Religion: Maya religion

Kʼakʼ Tiliw Chan Yopaat (Note: Mayan pronunciation: [kʼakʼ tiˈliw tʃan joˈpaːt]) (previously known variously as Cauac Sky (Note: Cauac meaning "rainstorm".), Kawak Sky, Butsʼ Tiliw (Note: Mayan pronunciation: [ɓutsʼ tiˈliw]) and Butzʼ Tiʼliw), was the leader of the ancient Maya city-state of Quiriguá.

== Reign ==
Kʼakʼ Tiliw Chan Yopaat ruled the city from 724 to 785 AD. The most significant event of his reign—and of Quiriguá's history—occurred in AD 738 (9.15.6.14.6 on the Mayan calendar), when his forces defeated the city of Copán. The ruler of Copán, Uaxaclajuun Ubʼaah Kʼawiil (formerly known as "18 Rabbit") was captured and later beheaded. It began when, in 734, on Altar M at Quirigua, Kʼak Tiliw Chan Yopaat gives himself the title kʼuhul ajaw, thus declaring Quirigua's independence from Copan. To formally declare his sovereignty, he received the K'awiil sceptre to signify his accession.

Before Kʼakʼ Tiliw Chan Yopaat's bold move, Quiriguá had been a vassal of Copán. The defeat of Copán led to its decline but heralded a golden age for its former dependent. For the next 38 years, stonecutters of Quiriguá created zoomorphs and stele celebrating their legendary king.

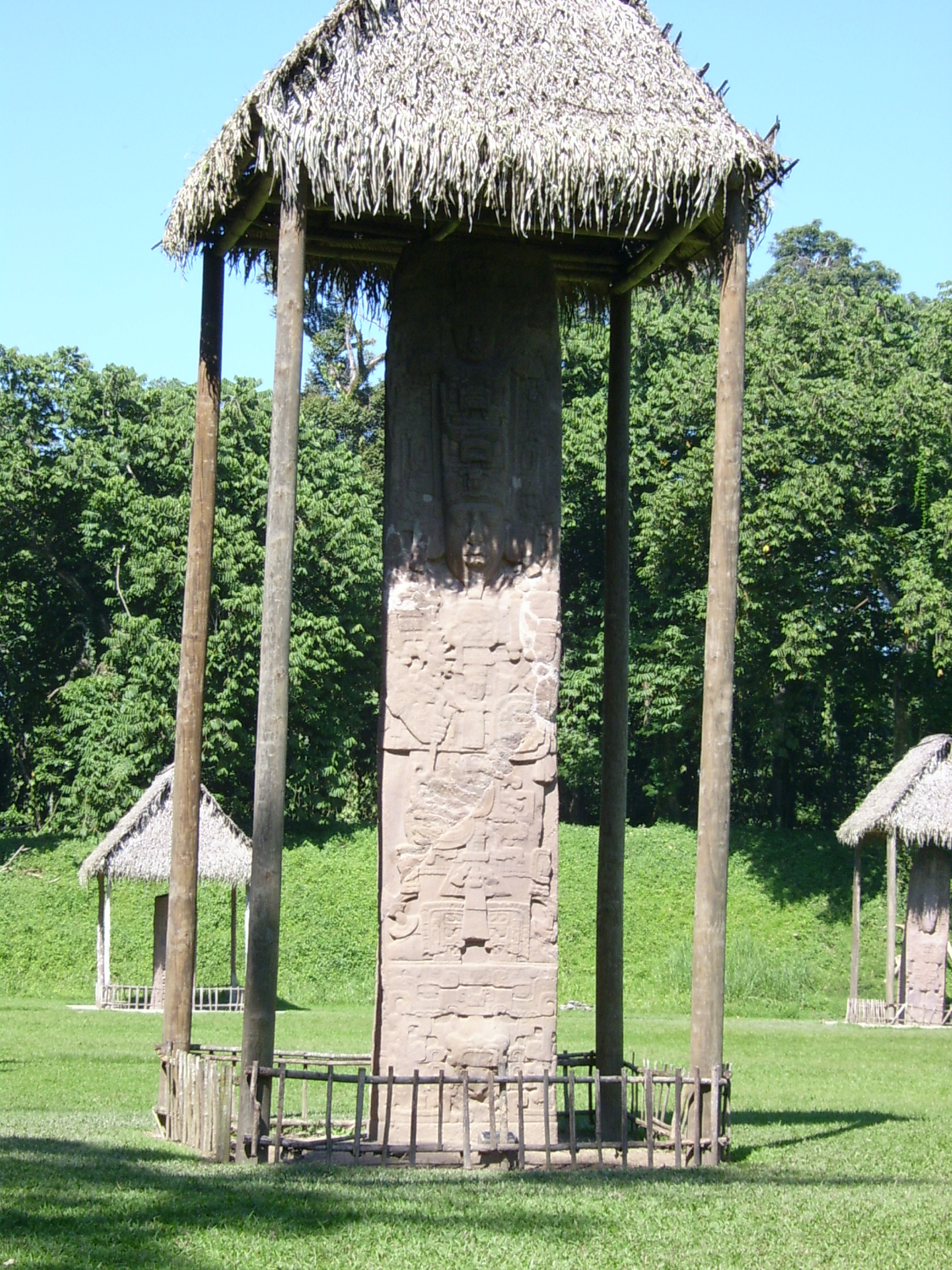
Stela E at Quiriguá, possibly the largest freestanding stone monument in the Americas.

His monuments are significant as their discovery by Frederick Catherwood and John Lloyd Stephens in 1840 contributed to dispelling the European misconception that pre-columbian Indigenous populations were less advanced, showcasing their ability to create monumental and highly sophisticated civilizations. His monumental achievements include the towering Stele E, carved from a single stone. It is known as the tallest stele in the Maya world, stretching 35 feet (10.7 metres high).

Quiriguá became a fully autonomous city which controlled the main trade route from the Caribbean to the Maya world. Meanwhile, this incident was followed by a 20-year hiatus in inscriptions at Copán, as well as the disappearance of any further mention of 18 Rabbit.

=== Death ===
Current evidence leads to the conclusion that Kʼakʼ Tiliw Chan Yopaat died in 785 AD. There remains a stone at Quiriguá, now identified as Zoomorph G, which seems to have served as his funeral marker.

=== Succession ===
Two other rulers are known to have reigned at Quiriguá in ensuing years—Sky Xul and Jade Sky—each for about ten years.
