= Classic Maya collapse =

Decline of classic Maya civilization

In archaeology, the classic Maya collapse is a model to describe the destabilization of Classic Maya civilization and the violent collapse and abandonment of many southern lowlands city-states between the 7th and 9th centuries CE. Modern scholars increasingly describe this period as a "rupture" or transformation rather than a true collapse, because a number of Maya cities survived even if they faced a period of instability.

The Classic Period of Mesoamerican chronology is generally defined as the period from 250 to 900 CE, the last century of which is referred to as the Terminal Classic. The Classic Maya collapse is one of the greatest unsolved mysteries in archaeology. Urban centers of the southern lowlands, among them Palenque, Copán, Tikal, and Calakmul, went into decline during the 8th and 9th centuries and were abandoned shortly thereafter. Archaeologically, this decline is indicated by the cessation of monumental inscriptions and the reduction of large-scale architectural construction at the primary urban centers of the Classic Period.

Although termed a collapse, it did not mark the end of the Maya civilization but rather a shift away from the Southern Lowlands as a power center; the Northern Yucatán in particular prospered afterwards, although with very different artistic and architectural styles, and with much less use of monumental hieroglyphic writing. In the Post-Classic Period following the collapse, the state of Chichén Itzá built an empire that briefly united much of the Maya region, and centers such as Mayapán and Uxmal flourished, as did the Highland states of the Kʼicheʼ and Kaqchikel Maya. Independent Maya civilization continued until 1697 when the Spanish conquered Nojpetén, the last independent city-state. Millions of Maya people still inhabit Guatemala and the Yucatán Peninsula today.

Because parts of Maya civilization unambiguously continued, a number of scholars strongly dislike the term "collapse". In his recent book, The Four Heavens, David Stuart argues that historical ruptures were a regular if dramatic part of Maya culture, noting similar abandonment events at Aguada Fenix in 1000 BCE and El Mirador at the end of the Preclassic. He notes that one of the major changes was the government system--the abandonment of the Ajawlel. This may have been the result of the political rise of the merchant class.

But an objection to the term "collapse" is nothing new. As early as the 1970s, E. Wyllys Andrews IV went as far as to say, "in my belief no such thing happened."

== Progression of the decline ==
The Maya often recorded dates on monuments they built. Few dated monuments were being built circa 500 – around ten per year in 514, for example. The number steadily increased to twenty per year by 672 and forty by around 750. After this, the number of dated monuments begins to falter relatively quickly, collapsing back to ten by 800 and to zero by 900. Likewise, recorded lists of kings complement this analysis. Altar Q at Copán shows a reign of kings from 426 to 763. One last king not recorded on Altar Q was Ukit Took, "Patron of Flint", who was probably an usurper. The dynasty is believed to have collapsed entirely shortly thereafter. In Quirigua, 49 kilometres (30 mi) north of Copán, the last king Jade Sky began his rule between 795 and 800, and throughout the Maya area all kingdoms similarly fell around that time.

A third piece of evidence of the progression of Maya decline, gathered by Ann Corinne Freter, Nancy Gonlin, and David Webster, uses a technique called obsidian hydration dating. The technique allowed them to map the spread and growth of settlements in the Copán Valley and estimate their populations. Between 400 and 450, the population was estimated at a peak of twenty-eight thousand, between 750 and 800 the population then began to steadily decline. By 900 the population had fallen to fifteen thousand, and by 1200 the population was again less than 1000.

Another piece of evidence used by historians to date the Classic Mayan decline is the absence of new buildings in the central Maya area after 830.

== Theories ==
More than 80 different theories or variations of theories attempting to explain the Classic Maya collapse have been identified. From climate change to deforestation to lack of action by Maya kings, there is no universally accepted collapse theory, although drought has gained momentum in the first quarter of the 21st century as the leading explanation, as more scientific studies are conducted.

=== Foreign invasion ===
The archaeological evidence of the Toltec intrusion into Seibal, Peten, suggests to some the theory of foreign invasion. The latest hypothesis states that the southern lowlands were invaded by a non-Maya group whose homelands were probably in the gulf coast lowlands. This invasion began in the 9th century and set off, within 100 years, a group of events that destroyed the Classic Maya. It is believed that this invasion was somehow influenced by the Toltec people of central Mexico. However, most Mayanists do not believe that foreign invasion was the main cause of the Classic Maya collapse; they postulate that no military defeat can explain or be the cause of the protracted and complex Classic collapse process. Teotihuacan influence across the Maya region may have involved some form of military invasion; however, it is generally noted that significant Teotihuacan-Maya interactions date from at least the Early Classic period, well before the episodes of Late Classic collapse.

The foreign invasion theory does not answer the question of where the inhabitants went. David Webster believed that the population should have increased because of the lack of elite power. Further, it is not understood why the governmental institutions were not remade following the revolts, which happened under similar circumstances in places like China. A study by anthropologist Elliot M. Abrams came to the conclusion that buildings, specifically in Copán, did not require an extensive amount of time and workers to construct. However, this theory was developed during a period when the archaeological evidence showed that there were fewer Maya people than there are now known to have been. Revolutions, peasant revolts, and social turmoil change circumstances, and are often followed by foreign wars, but they run their course. There are no documented revolutions that caused wholesale abandonment of entire regions.

=== Collapse of trade routes ===
It has been hypothesized that the decline of the Maya is related to the collapse of their intricate trade systems, especially those connected to the central Mexican city of Teotihuacán. Preceding improved knowledge of the chronology of Mesoamerica, Teotihuacan was believed to have fallen during 700–750, forcing the "restructuring of economic relations throughout highland Mesoamerica and the Gulf Coast". This remaking of relationships between civilizations would have then given the collapse of the Classic Maya a slightly later date. However, after researchers learned more about the events and the periods when they occurred, it is believed that the strongest Teotihuacan influence was during the 4th and 5th centuries. In addition, the civilization of Teotihuacan started to lose its power, and maybe abandoned the city, during 600–650. This differs greatly from the previous belief that Teotihuacán power decreased during 700–750. But since the new decline date of 600–650 has been accepted, the Maya civilizations are now thought to have lived on and prospered "for another century and more" than what was previously believed. Rather than the decline of Teotihuacan directly preceding the collapse of the Maya, its decline is now seen as contributing "to the 6th-century 'hiatus'".

=== Epidemic diseases ===
The disease theory is also a contender as a factor in the Classic Maya collapse. Widespread disease could explain some rapid depopulation, both directly through the spread of infection itself and indirectly as an inhibition to recovery over the long run. According to Dunn (1968) and Shimkin (1973), infectious diseases spread by parasites are common in tropical rainforest regions, such as the Maya lowlands. Shimkin specifically suggests that the Maya may have encountered endemic infections related to American trypanosomiasis, Ascaris, and some enteropathogens that cause acute diarrheal illness. Furthermore, some experts believe that, through development of their civilization (that is, development of agriculture and settlements), the Maya could have created a "disturbed environment", in which parasitic and pathogen-carrying insects often thrive. Among the pathogens listed above, it is thought that those that cause the acute diarrheal illnesses would have been the most devastating to the Maya population, because such illness would have struck a victim at an early age, thereby hampering nutritional health and the natural growth and development of a child. This would have made them more susceptible to other diseases later in life, and would have been exacerbated by an increasing dependence on carbohydrate-rich crops. Such ideas as this could explain the role of disease as at least a possible partial reason for the Classic Maya Collapse.

=== Drought theory ===
The drought theory holds that rapid climate change in the form of severe drought (a megadrought) brought about the Classic Maya collapse. Paleoclimatologists have discovered abundant evidence that prolonged droughts occurred in the Yucatán Peninsula and Petén Basin areas during the Terminal Classic. Large droughts likely caused a decline in agricultural fertility due to regular seasonal drought drying up surface waters, as well as causing thin tropical soils to erode when deprived of vegetation and forest cover.

Climatic factors were first implicated in the collapse as early as 1931 by Mayanists Thomas Gann and J. E. S. Thompson. In 1995, Hodell, Curtis, and Brenner published a paleoclimate record from Lake Chichancanab on the Yucatán Peninsula that showed an intense, protracted drought occurred in the 9th century AD and coincided with the Classic Maya collapse. In The Great Maya Droughts, Richardson Gill gathered and analyzed an array of climatic, historical, hydrologic, tree ring, volcanic, geologic, and archeological research, and suggested that a prolonged series of droughts likely caused the Classic Maya collapse. The drought theory provides a comprehensive explanation, because non-environmental and cultural factors (excessive warfare, foreign invasion, peasant revolt, less trade, etc.) can all be explained by the effects of prolonged drought on Classic Maya civilization.

According to Gill in The Great Maya Droughts:

[Studies of] Yucatecan lake sediment cores ... provide unambiguous evidence for a severe 200-year drought from AD 800 to 1000 ... the most severe in the last 7,000 years ... precisely at the time of the Maya Collapse.

The role of drought in the collapse of Classic Maya civilization has remained controversial, however, largely because the majority of paleoclimate records only provide qualitative data, for example whether conditions were simply "wetter" or "drier". The lack of quantitative data makes it difficult to predict how climatic changes would have affected human populations and the environment in which they lived. In 2012, a study attempted to quantify the drought using four detailed paleoclimate records of the drought event. Semi-quantitative rainfall estimates were achieved by correlating oxygen isotopes measurements in carbonate cave formations (speleothems) with modern seasonal rainfall amounts recorded in the nearby city of Mérida, northern Yucatán, which were extrapolated back to the time of the Terminal Classic Period. The authors suggest that modest rainfall reductions, amounting to only 25 to 40 percent of annual rainfall, may have been the tipping point to the Maya collapse. Although this analysis referred to the estimated decrease in rainfall as "modest", subsequent studies suggest that the same data could represent a 20 to 65 percent decrease in rainfall.

A study published in the journal Science in 2018 provides the most robust estimate of the magnitude of rainfall reduction to date. Evans and co-authors developed a method to measure the different isotopes of water trapped in the hydrate mineral, gypsum, a mineral that forms in lakes of the Yucatán Peninsula during times of drought when the water level is lowered. When gypsum forms, water molecules are incorporated directly into its crystalline structure, and this water records the different isotopes that were present in the ancient lake water at the time of its formation. The "fossil water" inside the crystals allowed Evans and his co-authors to analyze the properties of the lake water during each drought period. Based on these measurements, the researchers found that annual precipitation decreased between 41 and 54 percent during the period of the Maya civilisation's collapse, with periods of up to 70 percent rainfall reduction during peak drought conditions, and that relative humidity declined by 2 to 7 percent compared to today. This quantitative climate data can be used to better predict how these drought conditions may have affected agriculture, including yields of the Maya's staple crops, such as maize.

Critics of the drought theory question the spatial patterns of drought and its relation to the timing of the degradation of Maya city-states. Archaeological research demonstrates that while many regions of the Maya Lowlands were indeed abandoned during the eighth to eleventh centuries CE, other regions experienced only minor disruption, or even flourished. Although the spatial patterns of societal collapse are complex, population centers continued in many coastal regions and in the northern Yucatán Peninsula, including Chichen Itza, Uxmal, and Coba, whereas most states in the central regions collapsed and landscapes were depopulated. The reasons for this spatial heterogeneity in societal disintegration are largely unknown, but researches have hypothesised that central regions may have been more affected because of a very deep water table (which would have exacerbated the effects of drought), or that the longevity of the northern regions was likely facilitated by access to the coast, and thus trade routes.

Other critics of the megadrought theory, including David Webster, note that much of the evidence of drought comes from the northern Yucatán and not the southern part of the peninsula, where Classic Maya civilization flourished. Webster states that if water sources were to have dried up, then several city-states would have moved to other water sources. That Gill suggests that all water in the region would have dried up and destroyed Maya civilization is a stretch, according to Webster, although Webster does not have a precise competing theory explaining the Classic Maya Collapse. Since publication, further records from the more southerly states have strengthened the argument of a synchronous drought occurring across the Yucatán Peninsula.

Climatic changes are, with increasing frequency, found to be major drivers in the rise and fall of civilizations all over the world. Professors Harvey Weiss of Yale University and Raymond S. Bradley of the University of Massachusetts have written, "Many lines of evidence now point to climate forcing as the primary agent in repeated social collapse." In a separate publication, Weiss illustrates an emerging understanding of scientists:

Within the past five years new tools and new data for archaeologists, climatologists, and historians have brought us to the edge of a new era in the study of global and hemispheric climate change and its cultural impacts. The climate of the Holocene, previously assumed static, now displays a surprising dynamism, which has affected the agricultural bases of pre-industrial societies. The list of Holocene climate alterations and their socio-economic effects has rapidly become too complex for brief summary.

A number of causal mechanisms for droughts in the Maya area have been proposed, but there is no consensus among researchers regarding a single causal mechanism. Instead, it is likely that multiple mechanisms were involved, including solar variability, shifts in the position of the Intertropical Convergence Zone, changes in tropical cyclone frequency and deforestation.

The Maya are often perceived as having lived in a rainforest, but technically, they lived in a seasonal desert without access to stable sources of drinking water. The exceptional accomplishments of the Maya are even more remarkable because of their engineered response to the fundamental environmental difficulty of relying upon rainwater rather than permanent sources of water. "The Maya succeeded in creating a civilization in a seasonal desert by creating a system of water storage and management which was totally dependent on consistent rainfall." The constant need for water kept the Maya on the edge of survival. "Given this precarious balance of wet and dry conditions, even a slight shift in the distribution of annual precipitation can have serious consequences." Water and civilization were vitally connected in ancient Mesoamerica. Vernon Scarborough, an archaeologist and specialist in pre-industrial land and water usage practices, believes water management and access were critical to the development of Maya civilization.

=== Systemic ecological collapse model ===
Some ecological theories of Maya decline focus on the worsening agricultural and resource conditions in the late Classic period. It was originally thought that the majority of Maya agriculture was dependent on a simple slash-and-burn system. Based on this method, the hypothesis of soil exhaustion was advanced by Orator F. Cook in 1921. Similar soil exhaustion assumptions are associated with erosion, intensive agricultural, and savanna grass competition.

More recent investigations have shown a complicated variety of intensive agricultural techniques utilized by the Maya, explaining the high population of the Classic Maya polities. Modern archaeologists now comprehend the sophisticated intensive and productive agricultural techniques of the ancient Maya, and several of the Maya agricultural methods have not yet been reproduced. Intensive agricultural methods were developed and utilized by all the Mesoamerican cultures to boost their food production and give them a competitive advantage over less skillful peoples. These intensive agricultural methods included canals, terracing, raised fields, ridged fields, chinampas, the use of human feces as fertilizer, seasonal swamps or bajos, using muck from the bajos to create fertile fields, dikes, dams, irrigation, water reservoirs, several types of water storage systems, hydraulic systems, swamp reclamation, swidden systems, and other agricultural techniques that have not yet been fully understood. Systemic ecological collapse is said to be evidenced by deforestation, siltation, and the decline of biological diversity.

In addition to mountainous terrain, Mesoamericans successfully exploited the very problematic tropical rainforest for 1,500 years. The agricultural techniques utilized by the Maya were entirely dependent upon ample supplies of water, lending credit to the drought theory of collapse. The Maya thrived in territory that would be uninhabitable to most peoples. Their success over two millennia in this environment was "amazing."

=== Sociological ===
Anthropologist Joseph Tainter wrote extensively about the collapse of the Southern Lowland Maya in his 1988 study The Collapse of Complex Societies. His theory about Maya collapse encompasses some of the above explanations, but focuses specifically on the development of and the declining marginal returns from the increasing social complexity of the competing Maya city-states. Psychologist Julian Jaynes suggested that the collapse was due to a failure in the social control systems of religion and political authority, due to increasing socioeconomic complexity that overwhelmed the power of traditional rituals and the king's authority to compel obedience.

== See also ==
- Societal collapse, the collapse of a complex human society
- Bronze Age collapse, a similar collapse in the ancient Middle East
