= 504 (disambiguation) =

504 may refer to:

- 504, a year
- Avro 504, a World War 1 era biplane aircraft built by Avro
- Peugeot 504, a large family car
- Area code 504, telephone code in Louisiana, United States
- Section 504 of the Rehabilitation Act, which protects Americans with disabilities from discrimination by any entity that receives Federal funding
- 504 Gateway Timeout, a server error in web browsing etc. – see List of HTTP status codes § Server errors
- 504 King, a streetcar route in Toronto, Canada
- No. 504 Squadron RAF, of Britain's Royal Air Force
- List of highways numbered 504

== See also ==
- 504th (disambiguation)
