= Copán Bench Panel =

Mayan bench panel

- Material: Stone
- Size: Length of left and right panels - c. 263 cm each
- Weight: c. 321 kg (each panel)
- Writing: Mayan Script
- Created: 775 AD
- Discovered: Copan, Honduras
- Present location: British Museum, London
- Registration: Am1923, Maud.15

The Copán Bench Panel or Copan Bench Panel is the name of a sculpted platform that was originally located in Temple 11 at the Maya site of Copán in Honduras. Discovered by the English archaeologist Alfred Maudslay in the late nineteenth century, it now forms part of the British Museum's extensive collection of ancient artefacts from Central America. Dated to the late 8th Century AD, the panel is both a work of art and a significant historical record of royal authority.

== Description ==
The stone bench is composed of two long panels that when aligned together are over 5 metres in length. Both panels depict twenty seated individuals, split into two groups of ten facing each other, between which is engraved a central panel with hieroglyphic text. The scene portrayed on this enormous sculpture is thought to depict King Yax-Pac's accession to the throne, overseen by his ancestors from previous dynasties. Yax-pac is shown seated to the right of the central text; it is conjectured that the deceased kings' presence helped to justify his claim to the royal throne. The iconography of the bench panel is very similar to the famous Copán Altar Q.

== Provenance ==
Maudslay found this bench panel in pieces above a raised platform inside Temple 11 at Copán in 1881. He shipped it to England along with a number of other sculptures from the site and later donated most of his collection to the Victoria and Albert Museum, which in turn transferred Maudslay's original sculptures and extensive range of casts to the British Museum in 1923.

== See also ==
- Yaxchilan Lintel 24
- Fenton Vase
- Tulum Stela 1

== Bibliography ==
- M. Coe, Breaking the Maya code (London, Thames & Hudson, 1992)
- L. Schele and M.E. Miller, The blood of kings (London, Thames & Hudson, 1986)
- M. Coe and J. Kerr, The art of the Maya scribe (London, Thames & Hudson, 1997)
