= Fenton Vase =

Maya vase

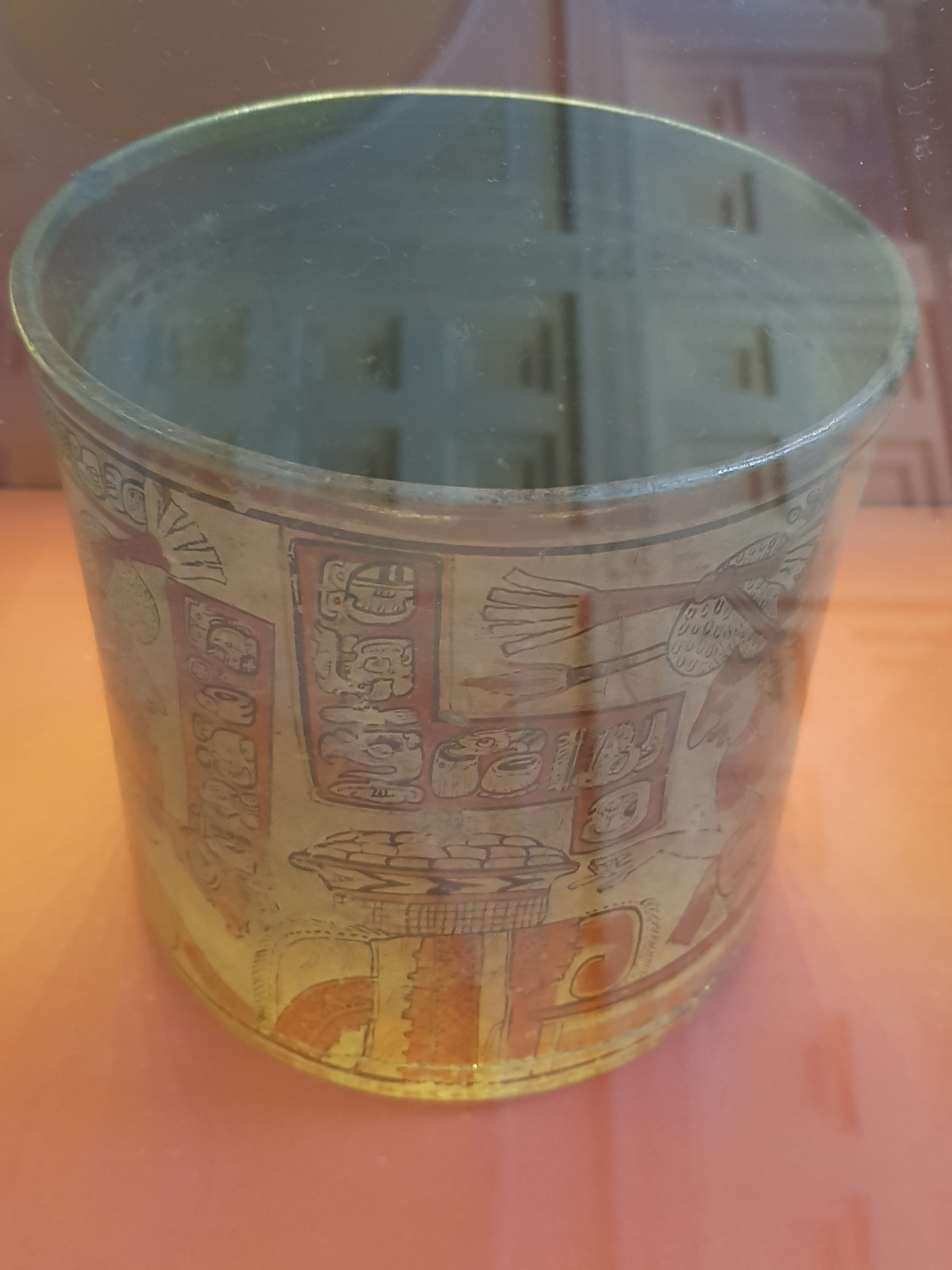
- Fenton Vase in the British Museum
- Material: Polychromed ceramic
- Size: 17.2 cm in diameter
- Writing: Mayan Script
- Created: 600-800 AD
- Discovered: Nebaj, Guatemala
- Present location: British Museum, London
- Registration: AOA 1930-1

The Fenton Vase is the name of a famous ancient Maya vase or cup that was excavated from the archeological site of Nebaj in the western Guatemala highlands. It is known for its intricate painting and historical record of the Maya elite. The vase was acquired by the British Museum in 1930, which named it after a donor. Other examples of Maya ceramics include the Princeton Vase.

== Description ==
The elaborately decorated pottery beaker records a tribute scene to a lord who sits on a palace throne. The seated lord points to the tribute in front of a kneeling prince. Behind the lord is another seated individual, who appears to hold a codex. Two standing figures frame the scene with hieroglyphic text displayed throughout. All the figures wear expensive clothing and jewellery. The seated Lord receiving the tribute is adorned with the most refined regalia and headdress.

== Provenance ==
The ceramic pot was discovered in 1904 at the archeological site of Nebaj in the highlands of Guatemala. It was later acquired by English collector CL Fenton. The British Museum purchased it from him in 1930, with the support of the National Art Collections Fund. Four similar vessels have been unearthed in the area since the late 20th century, suggesting there was a workshop or artist based in the vicinity of Nebaj during the late Classical Period. These high-quality items may have been commissioned by an individual Maya lord to represent important events from his life.

== See also ==
- Copán Bench Panel
- Yaxchilan Lintel 24
- Tulum Stela 1

== Bibliography ==
- C. McEwan, Ancient Mexico in the British (London, The British Museum Press, 1994)
- M. Coe, Breaking the Maya Code (London, Thames & Hudson, 1992)
- L. Schele and M.E. Miller, The Blood of Kings (London, Thames & Hudson, 1986)
- M. Coe and J. Kerr, The Art of the Maya Scribe (London, Thames & Hudson, 1997)
