= Tzi-Bʼalam =

Tzi-Bahlam
- Ajaw
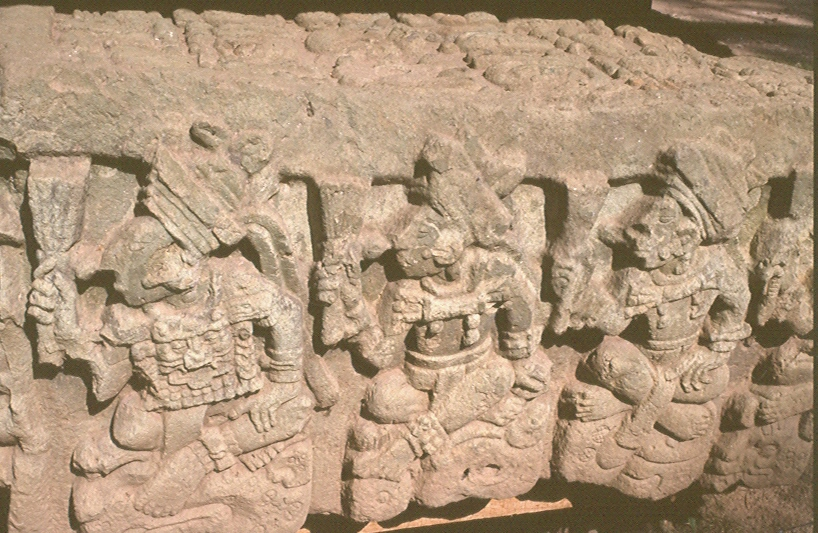
- Portraits of Wil Ohl K'inich, Sak-Lu and Tzi-Bahlam on Altar Q

King of Copán
- Reign: 26 May 553 – 26 October 578
- Predecessor: Sak-Lu
- Successor: Kʼakʼ Chan Yopaat
- Born: 6th century Copán
- Died: 26 October 578; Copán
- Issue: Kʼakʼ Chan Yopaat
- Father: Bahlam Nehn
- Religion: Maya religion

Tzi-Bʼalam was the tenth ruler of Copan. He was nicknamed Moon Jaguar by archaeologists. He was a son of Bʼalam Nehn, the 7th ruler. He was enthroned in May 553. His surviving monuments were found in the modern village of Copán Ruinas, which was a major complex during the Classic period. The most famous construction dating to his reign is the elaborate Rosalila phase of Temple 16, discovered entombed intact under later phases of the temple during archaeological tunneling work.
