= Sak-Lu =

- Ajaw
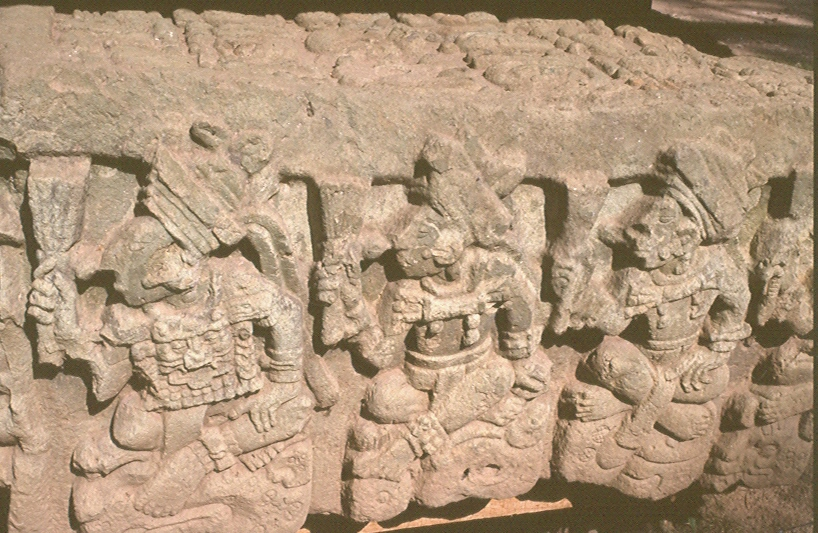
- Portraits of Wil Ohl K'inich, Sak-Lu and Tzi-Bahlam on Altar Q

King of Copán
- Reign: 551–553
- Predecessor: Wil Ohl K'inich
- Successor: Tzi-Bahlam
- Born: 6th century Copán
- Died: 553; Copán
- Father: Wil Ohl K'inich
- Religion: Maya religion

Sak-Lu was the ninth ruler of the Maya city state Copán.
