= Wil Ohl Kʼinich =

Ruler of the Maya city state Copan

Wil Ohl K'inich
- Ajaw
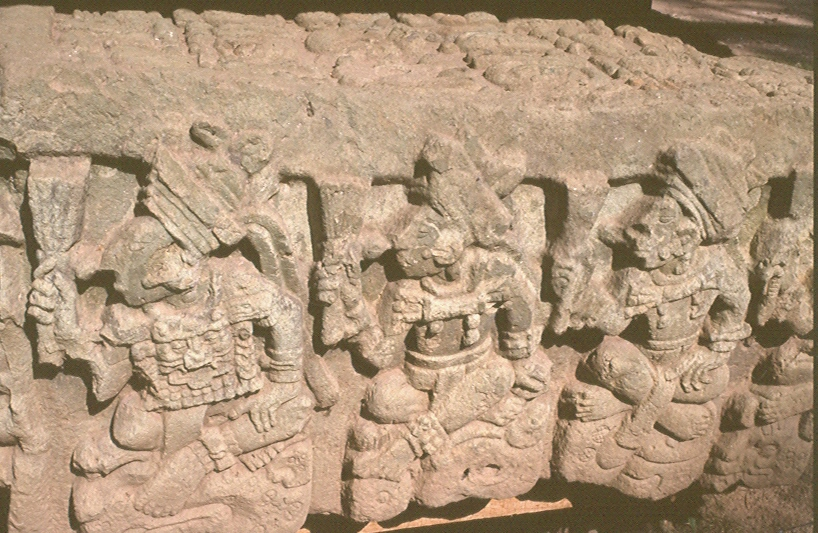
- Portraits of Wil Ohl K'inich, Sak-Lu and Tzi-Bahlam on Altar Q

King of Copán
- Reign: 544–551
- Predecessor: B'alam Nehn
- Successor: Sak-Lu
- Born: 6th century Copán
- Died: 551; Copán
- Issue: Sak-Lu
- Father: B'alam Nehn
- Religion: Maya religion

Wil Ohl Kʼinich was the eighth ruler of the Maya city state Copan. He was nicknamed Head on Earth by archaeologists.
