= Ukit Took =

Ajaw of Copán
- Reign: 6 February 822 – c. 830
- Predecessor: Yax Pasaj Chan Yopaat
- Successor: City-state abolished
- Born: Copán
- Died: c. 837? Copán
- Father: Yax Pasaj Chan Yopaat
- Religion: Maya religion

Ukit Took was the last Ajaw of Copán. He ascended the throne on 6 February 822. He commissioned Altar L in the style of Altar Q, but the monument was never finished — one face shows the enthronement of the king and a second face was started but two others were completely blank. The long line of kings at the once great city had come to an end. Before the end, even the nobility had been struck by disease, perhaps because epidemics among the malnourished masses spread to the elite. With the end of political authority at Copán, the population fell to a fraction of what it had been at its height. The collapse of the city-state, which is believed to have occurred sometime between 822 and 830 AD, was sudden.
