= Kʼakʼ Yipyaj Chan Kʼawiil =

- Ajaw
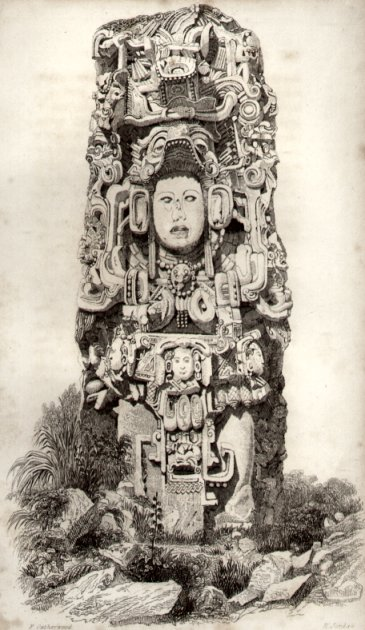
- Kʼakʼ Yipyaj Chan Kʼawiil's portrait on Stela N

King of Copán
- Reign: 18 February 749 – January 763
- Predecessor: Kʼakʼ Joplaj Chan Kʼawiil
- Successor: Yax Pasaj Chan Yopaat
- Born: Copán
- Died: January 763; Copán
- Spouse: A noblewoman/princess of Palenque
- Issue: Yax Pasaj Chan Yopaat
- House: Yax Kuk Mo Dynasty
- Father: Kʼakʼ Joplaj Chan Kʼawiil
- Religion: Maya religion

Kʼakʼ Yipyaj Chan Kʼawiil (died 763) was a ruler of the Maya city of Copán. He was the son of Kʼakʼ Joplaj Chan Kʼawiil. The early period of his rulership fell within Copán's hiatus but later on he began a programme of renewal in an effort to recover from the earlier disaster of the city. He built a new version of Temple 26, with the Hieroglyphic Stairway being reinstalled on the new stairway and doubled in length. Five life-size statues of seated rulers were installed seated upon the stairway. Kʼakʼ Yipyaj Chan Kʼawiil died in the early 760s and is likely to have been interred in Temple 11, although the tomb has not yet been excavated.

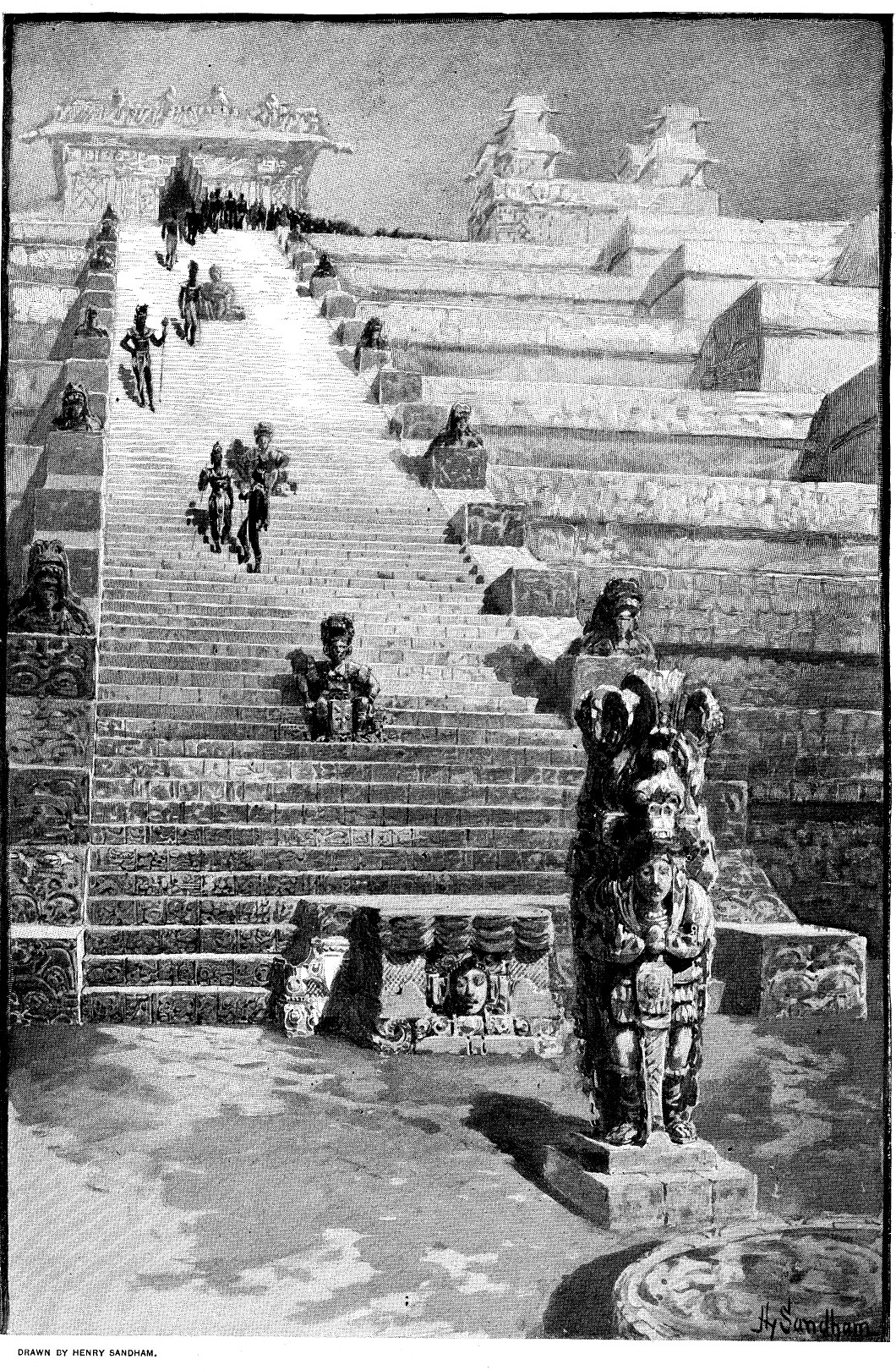
An old reconstruction drawing of the hieroglyphic stairway

The Hieroglyphic Stairway climbs the west side of Structure 10L-26. It is 10 meters (33 ft) wide and has a total of 62 steps. Stela M and its associated altar are at its base and a large sculpted figure is located in the centre of every 12th step. These figures are believed to represent the most important rulers in the dynastic history of the site. The stairway takes its name from the 2200 glyphs that together form the longest known Maya hieroglyphic text. The text is still being reconstructed, having been scrambled by the collapse of the glyphic blocks when the façade of the temple collapsed. The staircase measures 21 meters (69 ft) long and was first built by Uaxaclajuun Ubʼaah Kʼawiil in AD 710, being reinstalled and expanded in the following phase of the temple by Kʼakʼ Yipyaj Chan Kʼawiil in AD 755.
