= Chan Imix Kʼawiil =

Ajaw of Copán from 628 to 695

- Ajaw
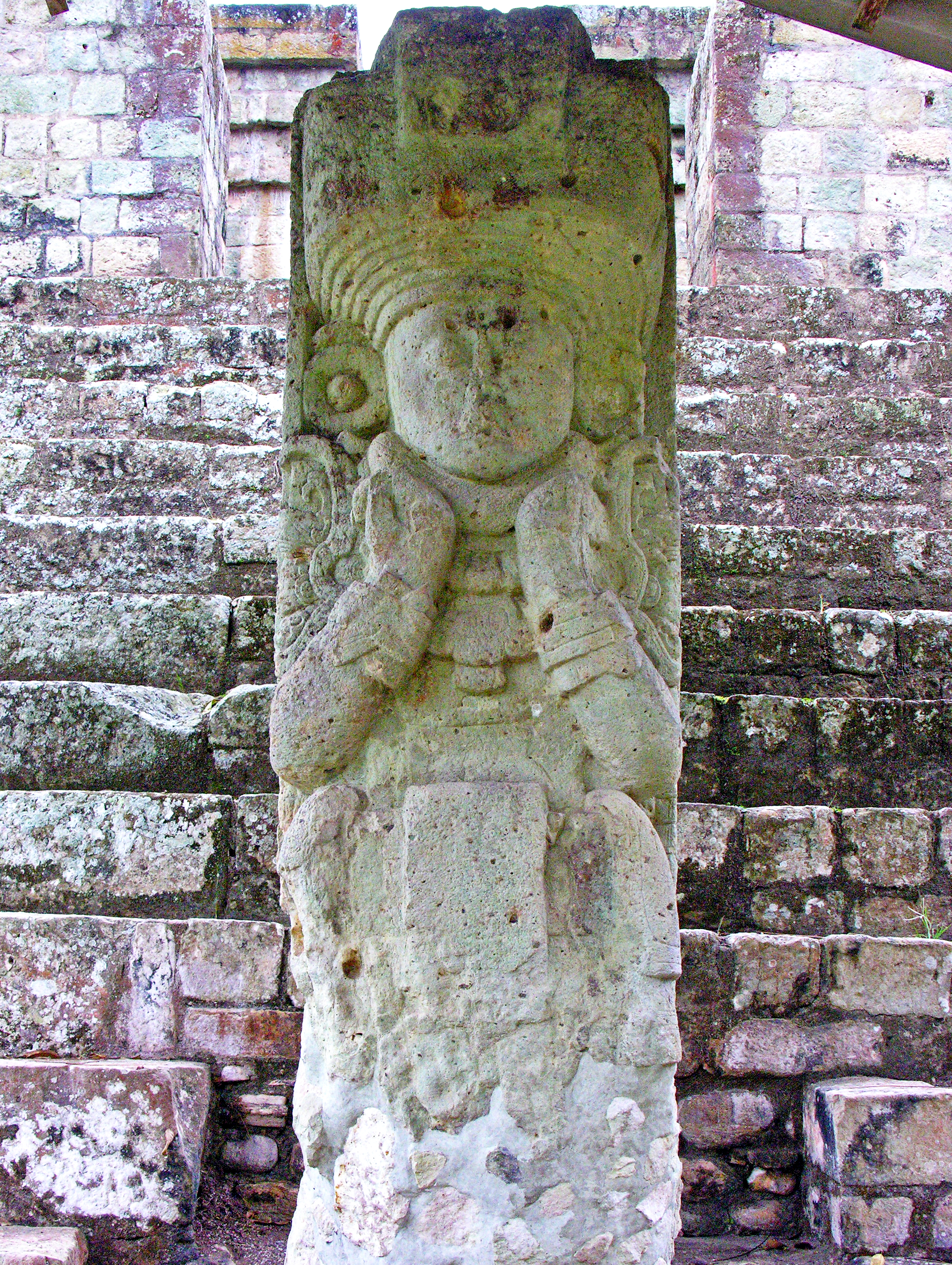
- Chan Imix K'awiil's portrait on Stela 1

King of Copán
- Reign: 8 February 628 – 18 June 695
- Predecessor: Kʼakʼ Chan Yopaat
- Successor: Uaxaclajuun Ubʼaah Kʼawiil
- Born: 14 November 604; Copán
- Died: 18 June 695 (aged 90); Copán
- Issue: Uaxaclajuun Ubʼaah Kʼawiil
- Father: Kʼakʼ Chan Yopaat
- Religion: Maya religion

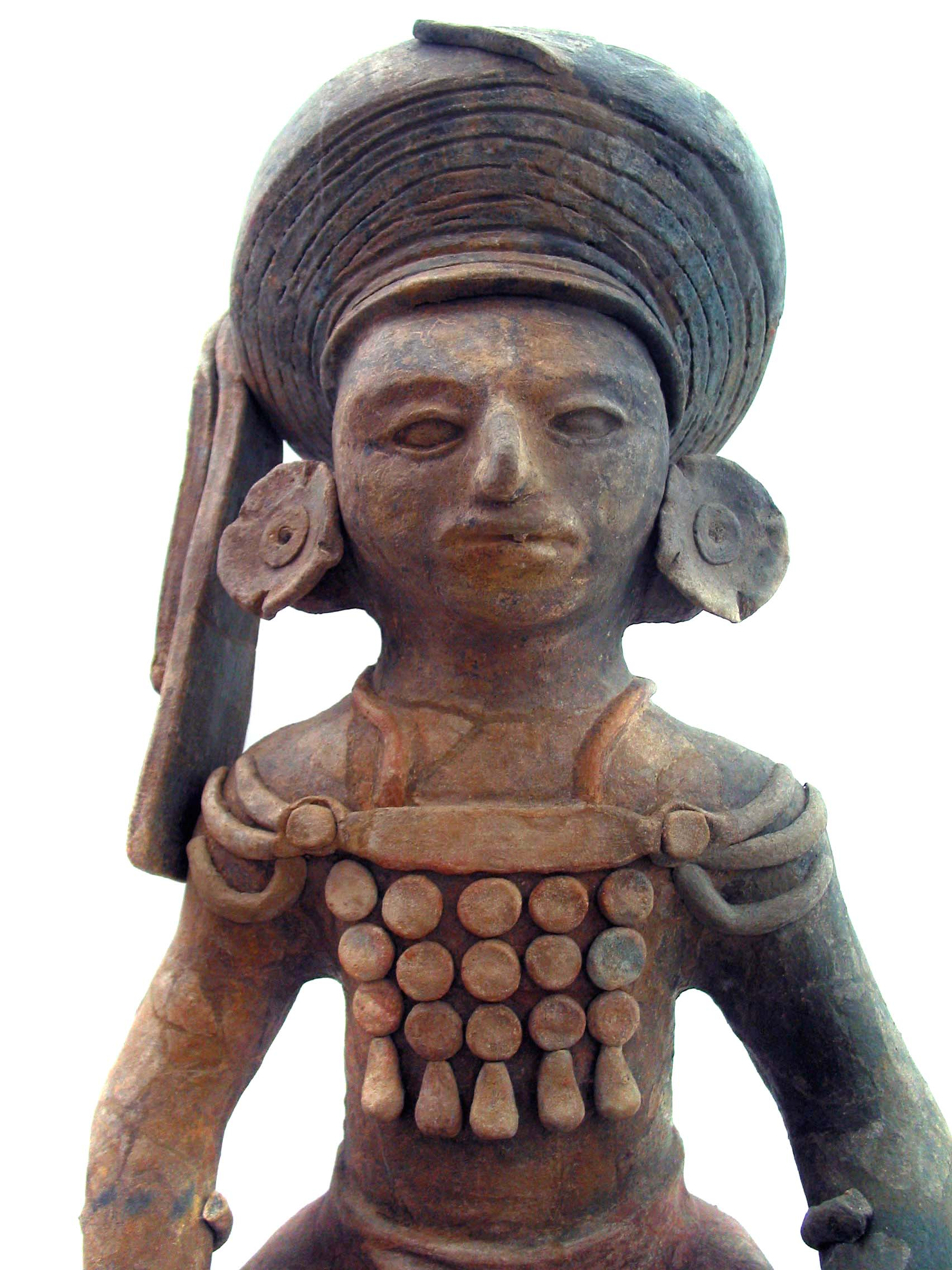
Statue of Chan Imix K'awiil, 12th king of Copán

Chan Imix Kʼawiil was the twelfth ruler of the Maya city state Copán. His nickname was Smoke Jaguar.

Smoke Jaguar is thought to have been the longest-reigning king of Copán, ruling from 628 to 695.

== Early life and crowning ==
Smoke Imix is believed to have been born in 604 CE and to have become king at the age of 23. He was crowned 16 days after the death of Kʼakʼ Chan Yopaat.

== Reign ==
Archaeologists have recovered little evidence of activity for the first 26 years of his reign, but in 652 CE there was a sudden rise in monument production, with two stelae being erected in the Great Plaza and four others in important locations across the Copán Valley. These monuments all celebrated a kʼatun-ending. He also erected a stela at the Santa Rita site 12 kilometers (7 1/2 mi) away and is mentioned on Altar L at Quiriguá in relation to the same event in 652. It is thought that he was trying to stamp his authority throughout the whole valley after the end of some earlier restriction to his freedom to rule as he wished.

After this sudden spate of activity, Smoke Imix continued to rule until almost the end of the 7th century; he dedicated another nine known monuments and made important changes to the architecture of Copán, including the construction of Structure 2 which closes the northern side of the Great Plaza and a new version of Temple 26, nicknamed Chorcha.

== Death and burial ==
Smoke Imix ruled Copán for 67 years and died on 18 June 695 at the age of 90, an age that was so distinguished that it is used to identify him in place of his name on Altar Q. His tomb had already been prepared in the Chorcha phase of Temple 26 and he was buried just two days after his death.

== In popular culture ==
Chan Imix is a playable leader (as "Smoke-Jaguar") of the Maya state in the 2001 video game Civilization III.

== See also ==
- List of longest-reigning monarchs
