= 504th =

504th may refer to:

- 504th Battlefield Surveillance Brigade (BfSB), located at Fort Hood, Texas
- 504th Bombardment Group (504th BG), a World War II United States Army Air Forces combat organization
- 504th Expeditionary Air Support Operations Group, active United States Air Force unit
- 504th Fighter Squadron or 137th Airlift Squadron flies the C-5 Galaxy and the C-17A Globemaster III
- 504th Infantry Regiment (United States), an airborne forces regiment of the US Army

== See also ==
- 504 (number)
- 504, the year 504 (DIV) of the Julian calendar
- 504 BC
