= Kʼakʼ Chan Yopaat =

- Ajaw
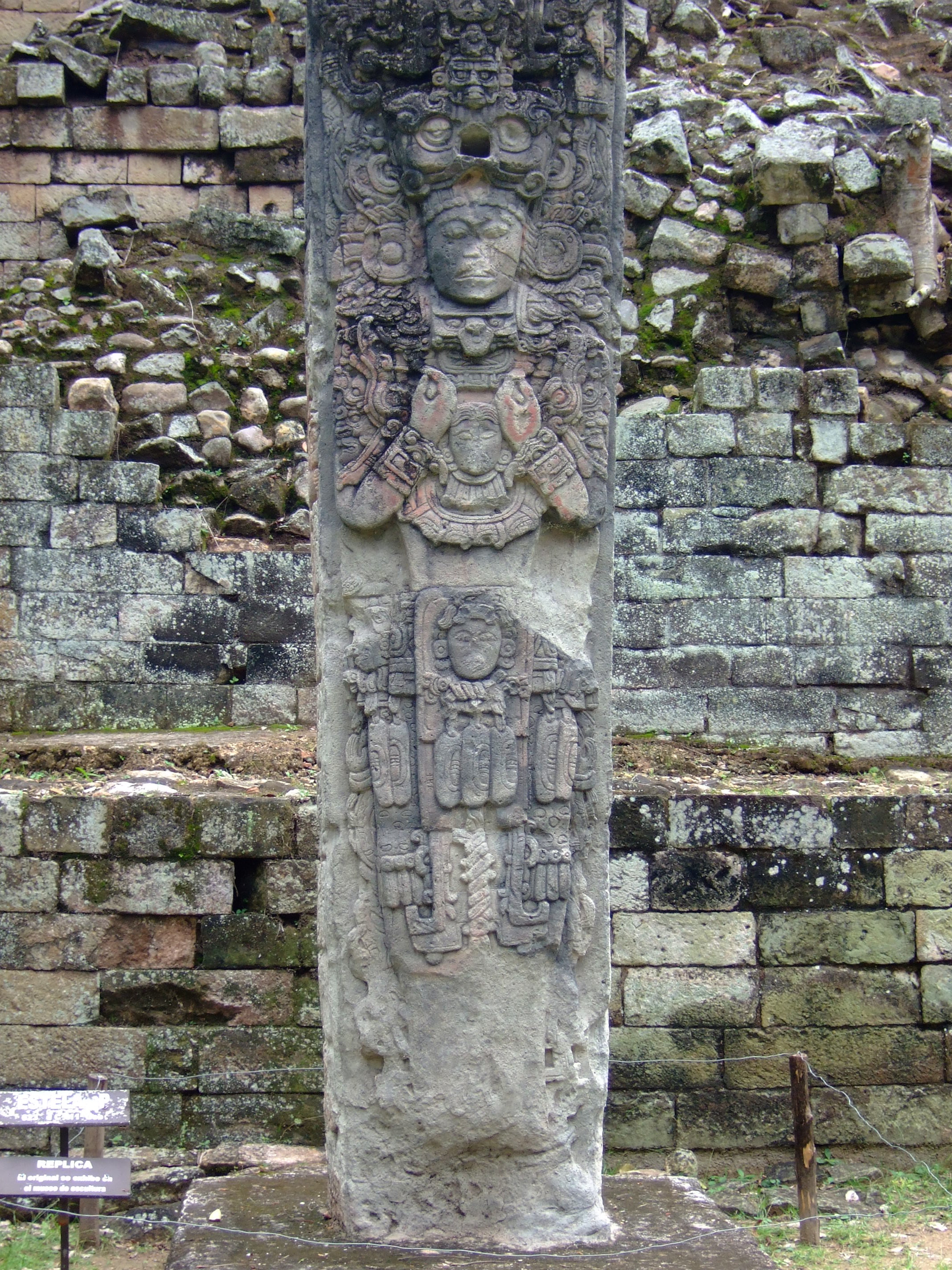
- Kʼakʼ Chan Yopaat's portrait on Stela P

King of Copán
- Reign: 19 November 578 – 5 February 628
- Predecessor: Tzi-Bʼalam
- Successor: Chan Imix Kʼawiil
- Born: 6th century Copán
- Died: 5 February 628; Copán
- Issue: Chan Imix Kʼawiil
- Father: Tzi-Bʼalam
- Religion: Maya religion

Kʼakʼ Chan Yopaat was the eleventh dynastic ruler at Copán. He was crowned as king in AD 578, 24 days after the death of Tzi-Bʼalam. At the time of his rule Copán was undergoing an unprecedented rise in population, with residential land use spreading to all available land in the entire Copán Valley. The two surviving stelae of Kʼakʼ Chan Yopaat contain long hard-to-decipher hieroglyphic texts and are the oldest monuments at the site to survive without being either broken or buried. He had a long reign, ruling at Copán for 49 years, and he died on 5 February 628. His name is recorded on four stelae erected by his successors, one of which describes a rite performed with relics from his tomb in AD 730, almost a hundred years after his death.
