= Tulum Stela 1 =

Mayan archaeological site in Tulum, Mexico

- Material: Limestone
- Size: c.1.8 metres
- Writing: Mayan Script
- Created: 564 AD
- Discovered: Tulum, Mexico
- Present location: British Museum, London
- Registration: Am1924,0510.1

Tulum Stela 1 is the name of a Mayan engraved monolith that was found at the ancient Mesoamerican site of Tulum in Mexico. Known for its important inscription, the stela was purchased by the British Museum in 1924.

== Description ==
The large stone stela portrays in low relief a standing Maya lord in full regalia, with a long inscription in Mayan hieroglyphs framing the image. The headdress is that of K'awiil, the skirt that of the Tonsured Maize God. The pillar was badly damaged when discovered and is missing parts of the base. The condition of the extant carving has also faded through water erosion. The long inscription includes a date that corresponds to 564 AD, based on the Mayan system of recording time.

== Provenance ==
Stela 1 was found by John Lloyd Stephens and Frederick Catherwood during their exploration of the Yucatán peninsular in the early nineteenth century. It was discovered near the 'Temple of the Initial Series' which lies to the south of the main castle at Tulum. This temple was named after Stela 1 as its Mayan inscription has the earliest recorded date in Tulum. Archaeologists estimate that most of Tulum is Post-Classic and that the city was largely built after 900 AD. As this stela predates this phase, it has been conjectured that it was moved from a neighbouring Maya city, perhaps Coba. The stela was subsequently owned by the British archaeologist Thomas Gann, who sold it to the British Museum in 1924.

== See also ==
- Copán Bench Panel
- Yaxchilan Lintel 24

== Bibliography ==
- C. McEwan, Ancient Mexico in the British (London, The British Museum Press, 1994)
- M. Coe, Breaking the Maya code (London, Thames & Hudson, 1992)
- L. Schele and M.E. Miller, The blood of kings (London, Thames & Hudson, 1986)
- M. Coe and J. Kerr, The art of the Maya scribe (London, Thames & Hudson, 1997)
