= Kʼakʼ Joplaj Chan Kʼawiil =

- Ajaw

King of Copán
- Reign: 11 June 738 – 4 February 749
- Predecessor: Uaxaclajuun Ubʼaah Kʼawiil
- Successor: Kʼakʼ Yipyaj Chan Kʼawiil
- Born: Copán
- Died: 4 February 749; Copán
- Issue: Kʼakʼ Yipyaj Chan Kʼawiil
- House: Yax Kuk Mo Dynasty
- Father: Uaxaclajuun Ubʼaah Kʼawiil
- Religion: Maya religion

Kʼakʼ Joplaj Chan Kʼawiil was installed as the 14th dynastic ruler of Copán on 7 June 738, 39 days after the execution of Uaxaclajuun Ubʼaah Kʼawiil. Little is known of his reign due to the lack of monuments raised after Quiriguá's surprise victory. Copán's defeat had wider implications due to the fracturing of the city's domain and the loss of the key Motagua River trade route to Quiriguá. The fall in Copán's income and corresponding increase at Quiriguá is evident from the massive commissioning of new monuments and architecture at the latter city and Copán may even have been subject to its former vassal. Kʼakʼ Joplaj Chan Kʼawiil died in January 749.
