= Bʼalam Nehn =

Bahlam Nehn
- Ajaw

King of Copán
- Reign: 504–544
- Predecessor: Muyal Jol
- Successor: Wil Ohl Kʼinich
- Born: 5th century Copán
- Died: 544; Copán
- Issue: Wil Ohl Kʼinich; Tzi-Bʼalam
- Father: Muyal Jol
- Religion: Maya religion

Bʼalam Nahn was the seventh ruler of Copan after the reformation initiated by Kʼinich Yax Kʼukʼ Moʼ. His nicknames were Jaguar Mirror and Waterlily-Jaguar. Bʼalam Nehn (often referred to as Waterlily Jaguar) was the first king to actually record his position in the dynastic succession, declaring that he was seventh in line from Kʼinich Yax Kʼukʼ Moʼ. Stela 15 records that he was already ruling Copán by AD 504. Bʼalam Nehn is the only king of Copán to be mentioned in a hieroglyphic text from outside of the southeastern Maya region. His name appears in a text on Stela 16 from Caracol, a site in Belize. The stela dates to AD 534 but the text is not well understood. Bʼalam Nehn undertook major construction projects in the Acropolis, building over an early palace with a number of important structures.
