= Yax Pasaj Chan Yopaat =

- Ajaw

King of Copán
- Reign: 2 July 763 – c. 810
- Predecessor: K'ak' Yipyaj Chan K'awiil
- Successor: Ukit Took
- Born: c. 754; Copán
- Died: c. 810 (aged 55–56); Copán
- Issue: Ukit Took
- Father: K'ak' Yipyaj Chan K'awiil
- Mother: A noblewoman/princess of Palenque
- Religion: Maya religion

Yax Pasaj Chan Yopaat, also known as Yax Pasaj Chan Yoaat, Yax Pac and Yax Pasah, was ruler of the Maya kingdom of Xukpi from 763 to 810 or later. This is on the site of the city of Copán in western Honduras. He is the king who made Altar Q.

He was the sixteenth and last king in line, whose name translates as 'New son on the Horizon'. He was the son of Smoke Shell and a noble woman of Palenque, and as soon as he had been crowned in AD 763 he began a program of artistic and architectural improvement of the city, which included the renovation of the structures built by his predecessors and the encouragement of the work of scientists and scribes. Moreover, he was also responsible for a series of agricultural improvements which led to a great increase in population. It was this king who commissioned Altar Q. In a frieze he is depicted receiving the royal scepter from the founder of the dynasty K'inich Yax K'uk' Mo'. He is also depicted on a travertine vase now belonging to the Princeton University Art Museum. By the time of his death in 800, nearly all the structures still visible on the Acropolis of the city today were standing complete. After his death Copán begun to sink into a period of decline, due to ineffective ruling authority. This resulted in the emigration of Copan's people to other city states.
