= Yaxchilan Lintel 24 =

Ancient Maya limestone relief from Mexico

Lintel 24
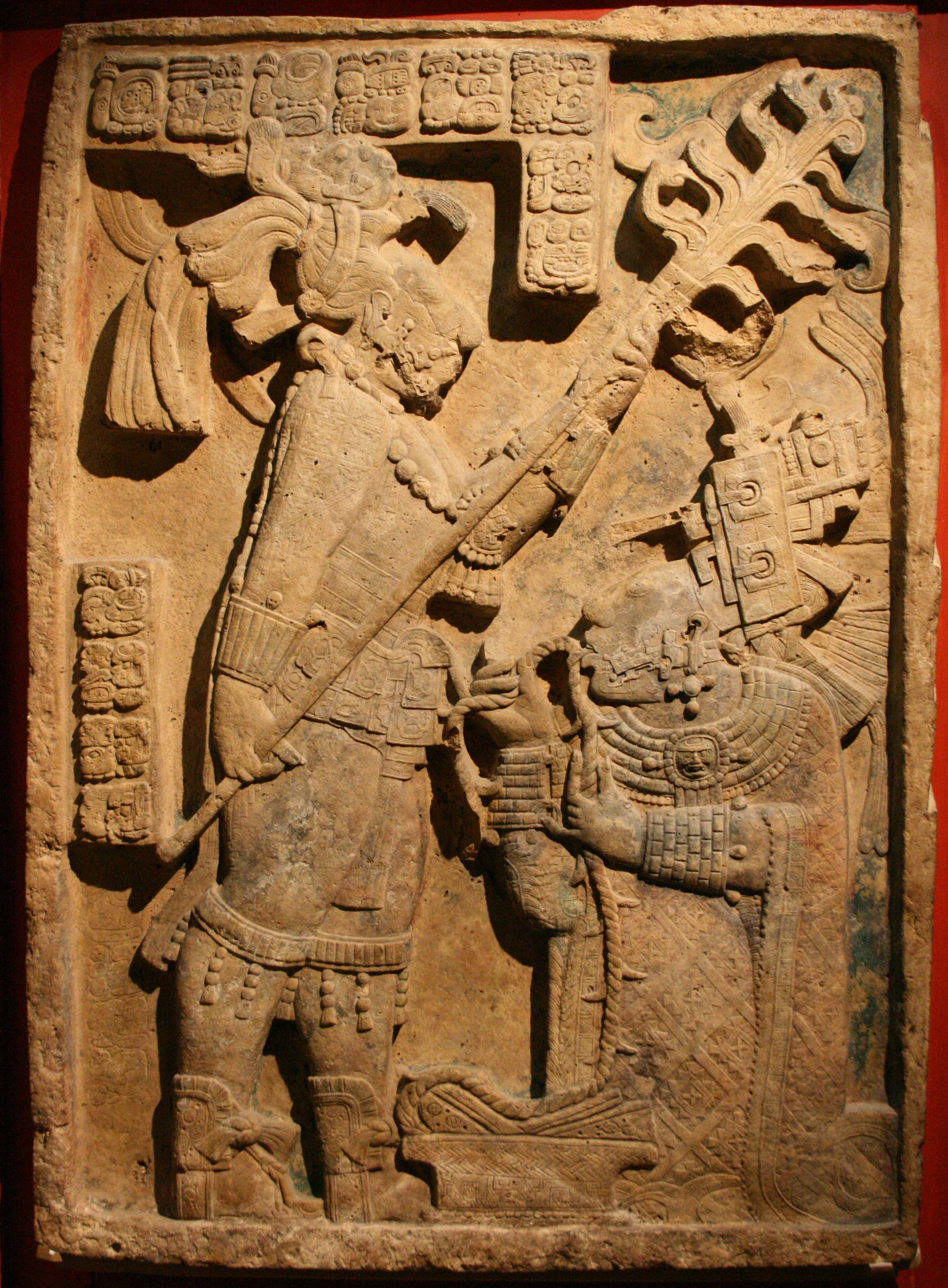
- The lintel as displayed in the British Museum
- Material: Limestone
- Created: Estimated to be 709 AD
- Present location: British Museum, London

Lintel 24 is the designation given by modern archaeologists to an ancient Maya limestone relief sculpture from Yaxchilan, in modern Chiapas, Mexico, which is now in the British Museum, London. The lintel dates to about 723–726 AD, placing it within the Maya Late Classic period. Its mid-relief carving depicts the ruler of Yaxchilan, Itzamnaaj Bahlam III (also known as Shield Jaguar), and his consort Lady K’abal Xoc, performing a ceremony of bloodletting; the imagery is also accompanied by descriptive captions, and (unusually for a Maya monumental text) a signature by the sculptor, Mo’ Chaak.

== Discovery and removal ==
Lintel 24 was found in its original context alongside Lintels 25 and 26 in Structure 23 of Yaxchilan. Alfred Maudslay had the lintel cut from the wall of a side entrance in 1882 and shipped to Great Britain where it remains today in the British Museum in London. Lintel 25 made the journey in 1883. Lintel 26 was discovered in 1897 by Teobert Maler. It was removed to the Museo Nacional de Antropología e Historia in 1964.

== Inscriptions ==
The text comprises three discrete sections. The uppermost describes Itzamnaaj Bahlam, where the second raised section describes Lady Xoc. The final sentence, which is not elevated like the other two, is an artist’s signature.

=== A1-F3 ===
ti-5-EB 15-ma-AK-u-ba-hi ti-CH’AB-li ti-K’AK’-la-ju-lu u-CH’AB-4-WINIKHAB-AJAW ITZ’-BALAM-ma-u-cha-CHAN-nu a-NIK-ki K’UHUL-[PA’]CHAN-AJAW
ti ho (?) holaju’n mak u baah ti ch’abil ti k’ak’al jul u ch’ab chan winikhaab ajaw Itz’[amnaaj] Bahlam u cha’n Aj Nik k’uhul Pa’chan ajaw
"On 5 [Eb] 15 Mak, his image at the penance with the flaming spear, his penance, the four-k’atun lord Itzamnaaj Bahlam, captor of Ah Nik and holy lord of Yaxchilan."

=== G1-G4 ===
u-ba-ti-CH’AB-li IX-CH’AK?-ku-na-XOK-ki IX-k'a[ba]-la-XOK-ki IX-KALOM-TE’
u baah ti ch’abil ix ch’akan xook Ix K’abal Xook ix kalo’mte’
"Her image at the penance, the cut lady, Ix K’abal Xoc, female autocrat."

=== H1-H4 ===
T’AB-ya yu-xu-lu MO’-CHAK-ki a-HIX?-la
t’abiiy yuxul mo’ chaak aj hixiil?
"His sculpture was erected, Mo’ Chaak, he of Hixil?"

== Style ==
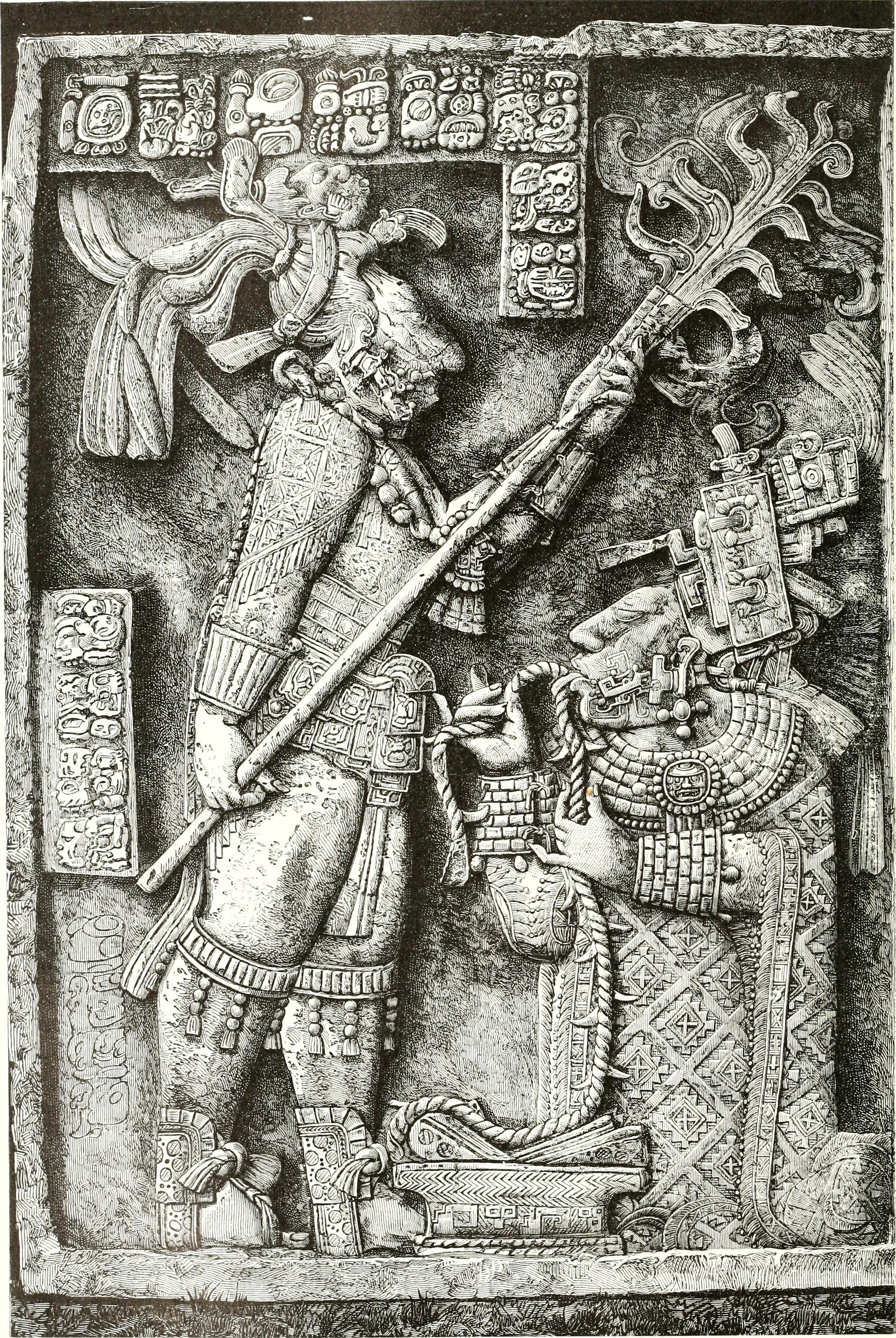
Drawing by Désiré Charnay (1885)

The lintel is done in high relief style with the background deeply recessed. All three were apparently commissioned by Lady Xoc for the doorways of Structure 23. The lintels show the elaborate costumes of the king and queen with remarkable detail and an uncharacteristic lack of abstraction. These lintels are considered by some to be the pinnacle of Mayan art. We are able to study the detail of Mayan weaving as depicted in these carvings, and see the pearls woven into the fabric. Subtle differences in the three lintels suggest that the compositions were completed by two or three different artists. Each of the works is signed, indicating that the production of such works was regarded as a highly specialized skill rather than a trade.

== The King ==
Itzamnaaj Bahlam III was a central figure in directing the course of Yaxchilan. He ascended to power in AD 681 and died in AD 742. There are numerous documented references to him on artifacts at the end of Stage V at Yaxchilan. In Lintel 24, he is depicted holding a torch above his first wife, Lady Xoc. The king is wearing his hair back with quetzal feathers indicating that he will also let blood in this ceremony. Attached to his head band is what appears to be a representation of the Jester Mask. The jester mask is considered analogous to the glyph for kingship, ajaw, and is named so for the vegetation often depicted coming from the crown of it. Since the rest of the costume is depicted without much abstraction, it is suggested that Maya kings may have literally attached a shrunken head to their head band as a representation of power. He is shown wearing a pectoral with a representation of the sun god depicted. It is strung from a jade bead necklace that is counterbalanced by a long strand of jade beads and what are probably carved shells going down his back. The artist was careful to show such minute details as the strings that are tied to hold on the wrist cuffs worn by both royals, and the pattern woven on Itzamnaaj Bahlam’s beautiful cape.

== The Queen ==
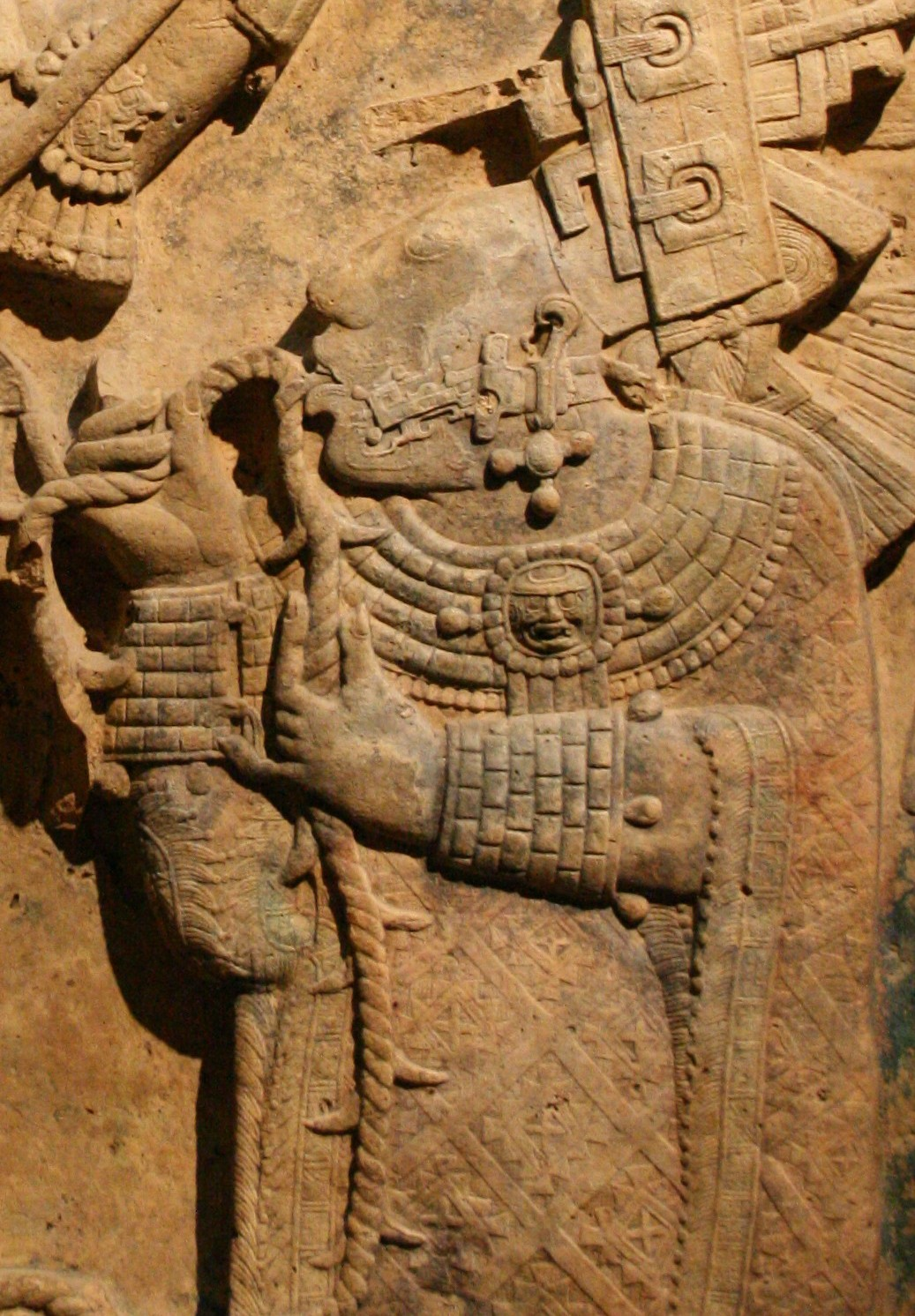
Detail of Lady Xoc

Lady Xoc is one of the most prominent and probably politically powerful women in the Maya civilization. Lady Xoc is shown here performing an important royal rite of blood letting. By pulling the rope studded with obsidian shards through her tongue, she causes blood to drip onto paper strips held in a woven basket to be burned as depicted on Lintel 25. Blood scrolls can be seen on her face. The queen also wears an elaborate headdress. There are flower tassels on the main part of the head band and a mosaic depiction of Tlaloc sprouting quetzal feathers. Her elaborately carved huipil is trimmed with fringe and pearls. Her necklace also appears to have a pectoral depiction of the sun god. It is probably made of shell or jade plaques, as are her wrist cuffs.

== Associated tombs ==
Recent excavations have unearthed what is thought to be the tombs of Itzamnaaj Bahlam and Lady Xoc within Structure 23. Discovered in association with the female burial attributed to Lady Xoc were 146 prismatic obsidian blades, each with two lateral notches on the edges. These were located in what is known as Element 21 in Room 1 of Structure 23 at Yaxchilan. Due to the association with Lady Xoc’s burial in Room 2, these have been interpreted as being depicted on Lintel 24. The original interpretation of the studded rope was that there were thorns attached, but this new evidence in context has caused the interpretation to shift. We now know that it was a rope studded with obsidian blades used in the ritual, and may have the very physical shards depicted themselves. Lady Xoc’s burial is known as Tomb 3. Itzamnaaj Bahlam’s remains lay not far, in Room 3. This is referred to as Tomb 2. Elaborate grave goods were found in association with both burials.

== See also ==
- Copán Bench Panel
- Fenton Vase

== Notes ==
Preceded by 50: Silk princess painting	A History of the World in 100 Objects; Object 51	Succeeded by 52: Harem wall painting fragments
