= Uaxaclajuun Ubʼaah Kʼawiil =

- Ajaw
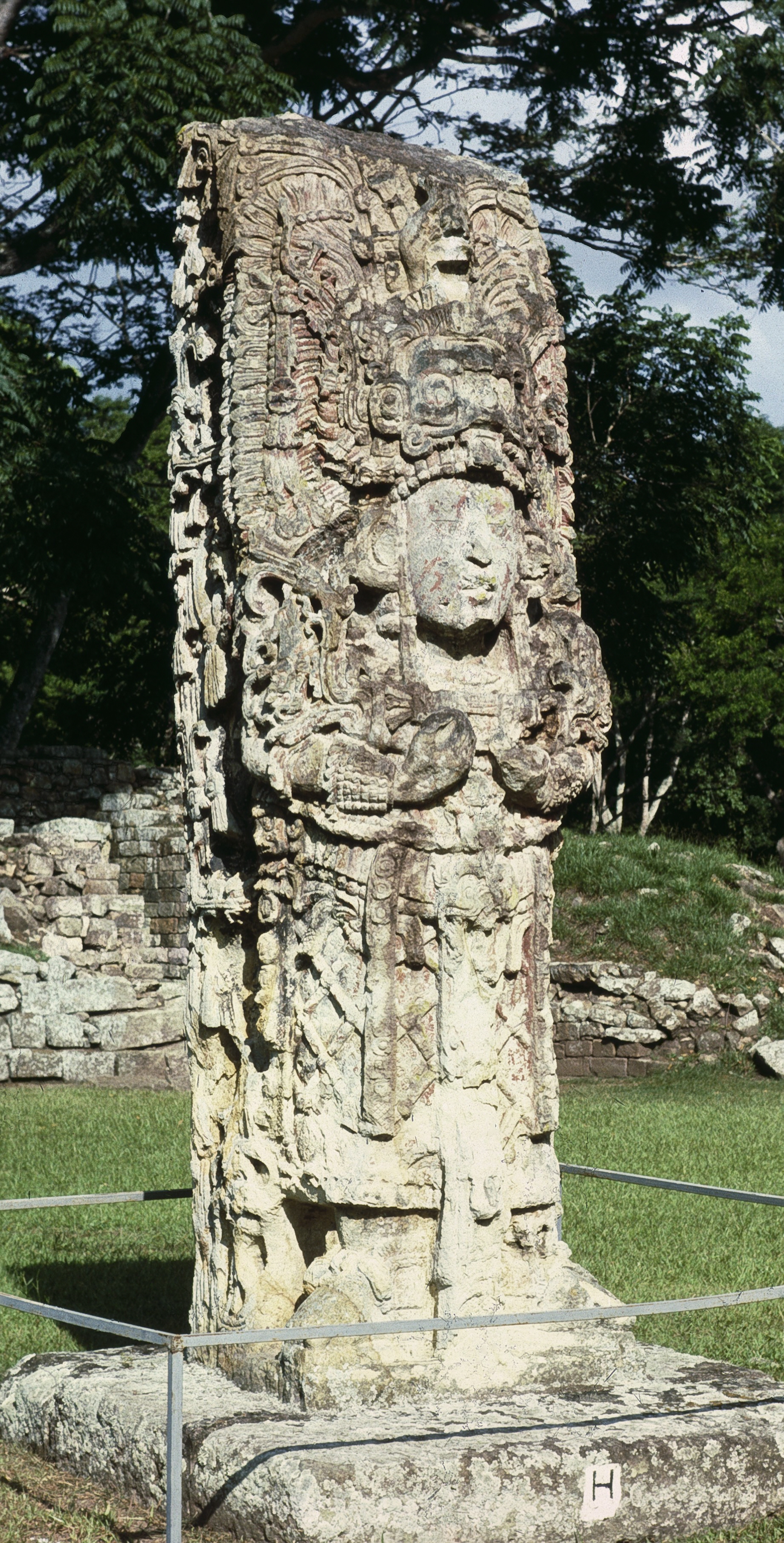
- Uaxaclajuun Ubʼaah Kʼawiil's portrait on Stela H

King of Copán
- Reign: 9 July 695 – 3 May 738
- Predecessor: Chan Imix Kʼawiil
- Successor: Kʼakʼ Joplaj Chan Kʼawiil
- Born: 675; Copán
- Died: 3 May 738 (aged 62–63); Quiriguá
- Issue: Kʼakʼ Joplaj Chan Kʼawiil
- House: Yax Kuk Mo Dynasty
- Father: Chan Imix Kʼawiil
- Religion: Maya religion

Uaxaclajuun Ubʼaah Kʼawiil (also known as "Eighteen Rabbit" or "Waxaklajuun Ub'aah K'awiil"), was the 13th ajaw or ruler of the powerful Maya polity associated with the site of Copán in modern Honduras (its Classic Maya name was probably Oxwitik). He ruled from January 2, 695, to May 3, 738.

== Etymology ==
His name translates as "Eighteen are the Faces (or Images) of K'awiil" and is a reference to the many forms that the Maya god K'awiil (a god of power, creation, and lightning) could take.

== History ==
Uaxaclajuun Ubʼaah Kawiil ascended to the throne of Copan upon the death of the 12th ruler in the line of the founder, Smoke Imix, in 695. He began his reign with the construction of the Esmeralda Structure in order to entomb the remains of Smoke Imix. This ritually terminated the adjacent ancient temple of Papagayo constructed 250 years earlier by the celebrated Ruler 2, son of Kʼinich Yax Kʼukʼ Moʼ. He later constructed the original hieroglyphic stairway on the east side of the Esmeralda Structure. A passage on the stairway commemorates its construction 15 years after the death of Smoke Imix.

== Architecture ==
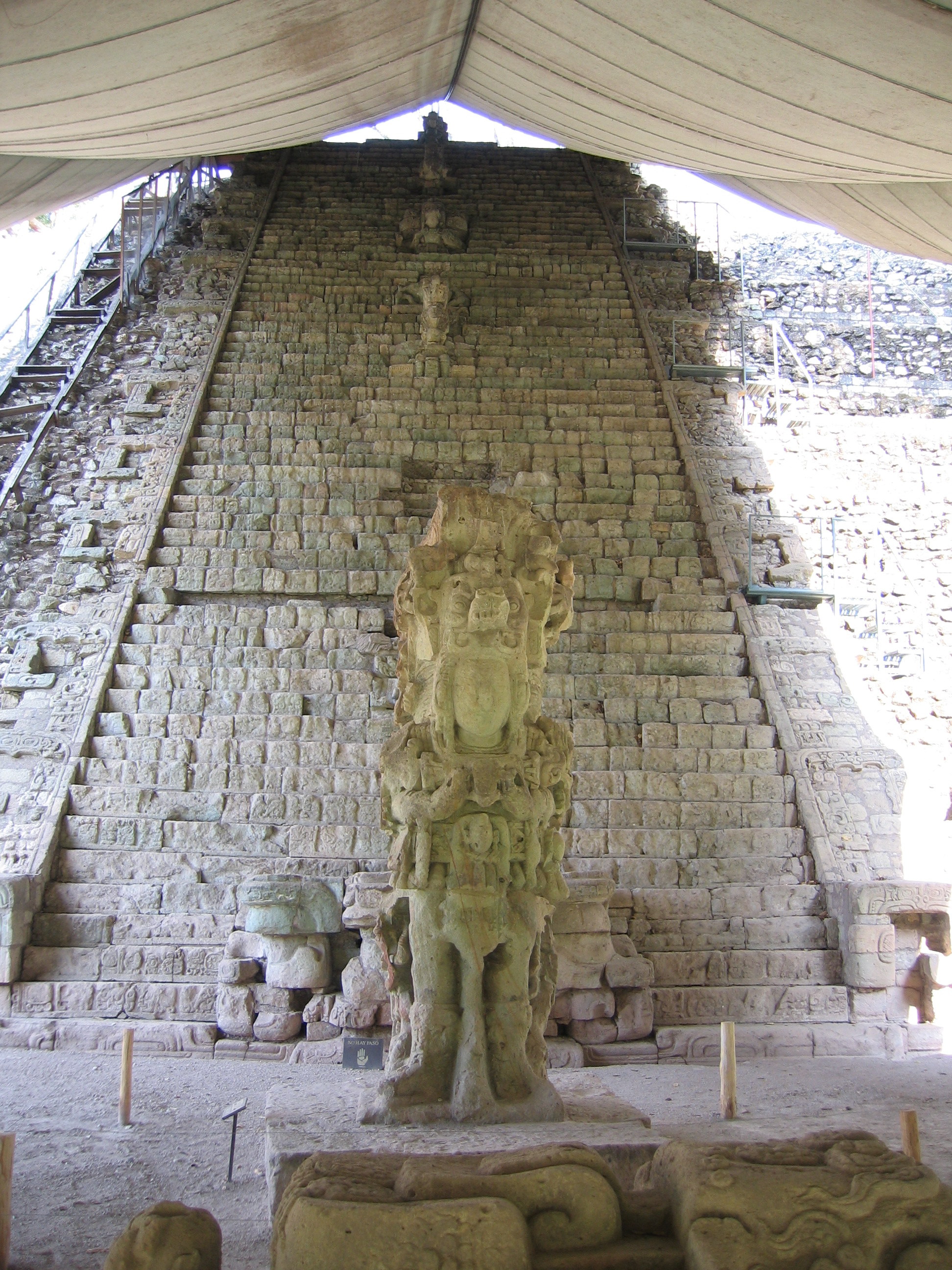
The Hieroglyphic Stairway.

Based on the number of structures and monuments constructed during his reign, Uaxaclajuun Ubʼaah Kawiil is considered the greatest patron of the arts in Copan's history. This period was characterized by a deep, florid relief, which represents the culmination of the sculptural tradition of Copan.

=== The living mountain ===
The reign of Uaxaclajuun Ubʼaah Kawiil saw the construction of several structures, some of which were lost to erosion by the Copan River. The most impressive of these is Structure 10L-22, which represents a sacred man-made mountain. The inner chamber of 10L-22 was likely central in the performance of auto-sacrificial bloodletting rituals. The corners of the structure are decorated with stone masks, textually labeled as 'stone mountain'. The entrance was carved in the likeness of an arching Celestial Monster, representing the mouth of a cave and a symbolic entrance into the earth.

=== Ballcourt ===
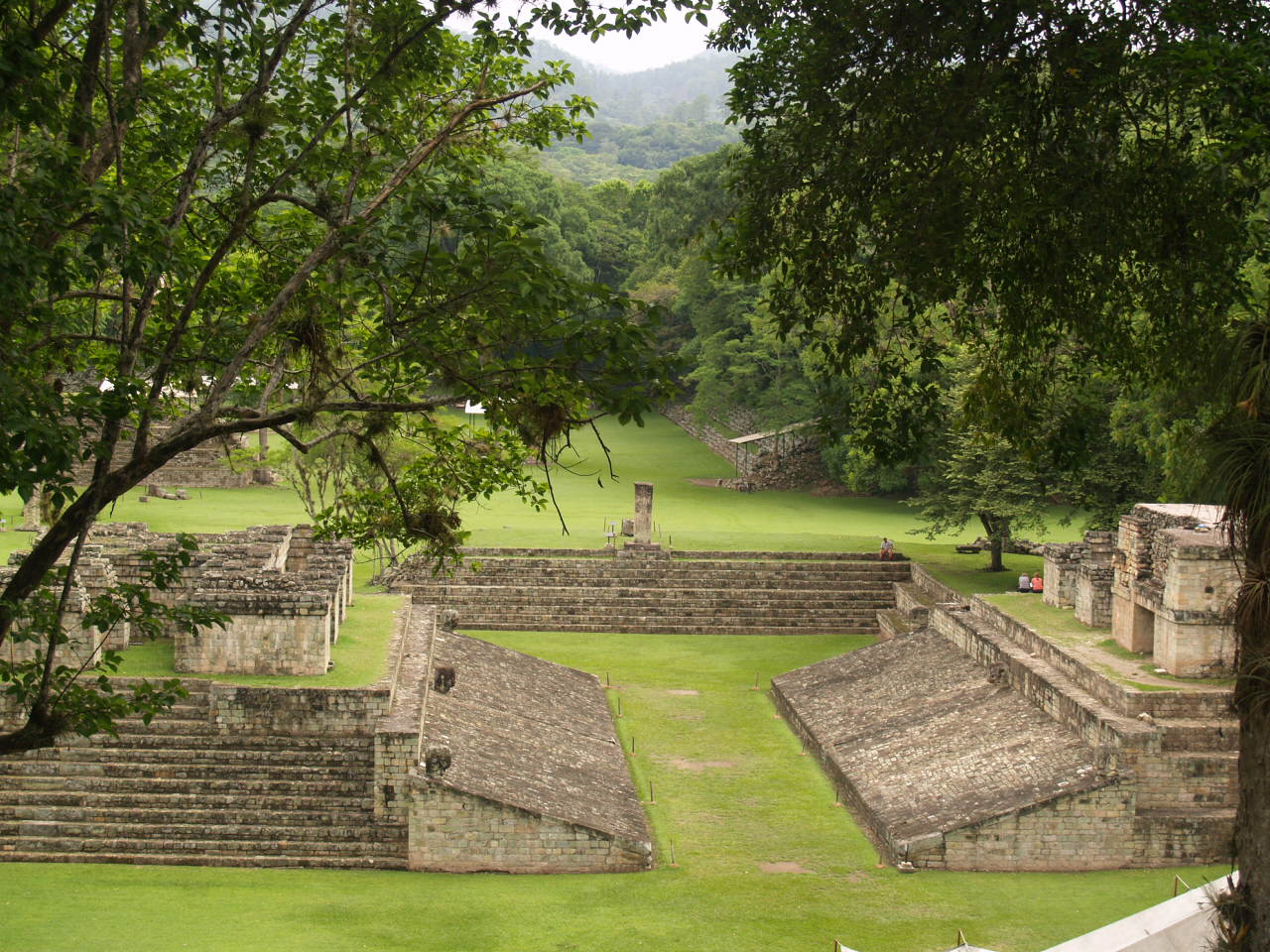
The final version of the ballcourt was dedicated by Uaxaclajuun Ubʼaah Kʼawiil in AD 738.

The final architectural achievement of Uaxaclajuun Ubʼaah Kawiil was Ballcourt A-III. It is one of the most imposing Mesoamerican ballcourts in the region, surpassed only by that of Chichen Itza. It is remarkable for the sloping benches used by players of the game, and by six macaw markers, the function of which is not completely resolved. Many of the stone macaws associated with the ballcourt wear the sign for darkness, akbal, on their tails. The macaw is typically symbolic of the sun, so these akbal macaws may be symbolic of sun in the Underworld. This could make the players symbolic combatants in the battle between light and dark. The inclined benches of the ballcourt are inscribed with hieroglyphic text, one of these being the commemoration date. It was dedicated in 738, only 113 days before Uaxaclajuun Ubʼaah Kawiil's death.

== Sculpture ==
Between 711 and 736, Uaxaclajuun Ubʼaah Kawiil commissioned the construction of seven monuments. Stelas C, F, 4, H, A, B, and D (erected in that order) represent one of the greatest achievements in Classic Maya sculpture. Each stela depicts Uaxaclajuun Ubʼaah Kawiil in ritual pose, with a two-headed centipede bar clasped to his chest. The text of Stela A proclaims that Copan ranked with three other kingdoms, Calakmul, Palenque, and Tikal, as the four great polities of the Maya World.

== Death and aftermath ==
=== Beheading ===
Uaxaclajuun Ubʼaah Kawiil was captured and beheaded by Kʼakʼ Tiliw Chan Yopaat, ruler of the small polity of Quirigua, on May 3, 738. Quirigua was a vassal of Copan, founded by a subordinate of Kʼinich Yax Kʼukʼ Moʼ in 426. Though only about one-tenth the size of Copan, it was an important location controlling the Motagua River trade route. About 35 years into his reign, Uaxaclajuun Ubʼaah Kawiil presided over the accession of Kʼak Tiliw Chan Yopaat, who was to be subject to Copan's authority. In 734 on Altar M at Quirigua, Kʼak Tiliw Chan Yopaat gives himself the title kʼuhul ajaw, thus declaring Quirigua's independence from Copan. In 738, a date given conspicuous prominence in Quirigua's monuments, Kʼakʼ Tiliw Chan Yopaat captured and beheaded Uaxaclajuun Ubʼaah Kawiil. This event is recorded on Quirigua's monuments as an 'ax event', referring to the beheading of Uaxaclajuun Ubʼaah Kawiil. The only reference at Copan is on the Hieroglyphic Stairway, recording the death of Uaxaclajuun Ubʼaah Kawiil by 'flint and shield'. There is no evidence of a large-scale battle at or around Copan during the 730's, suggesting that Uaxaclajuun Ubʼaah Kawiil was captured abroad.

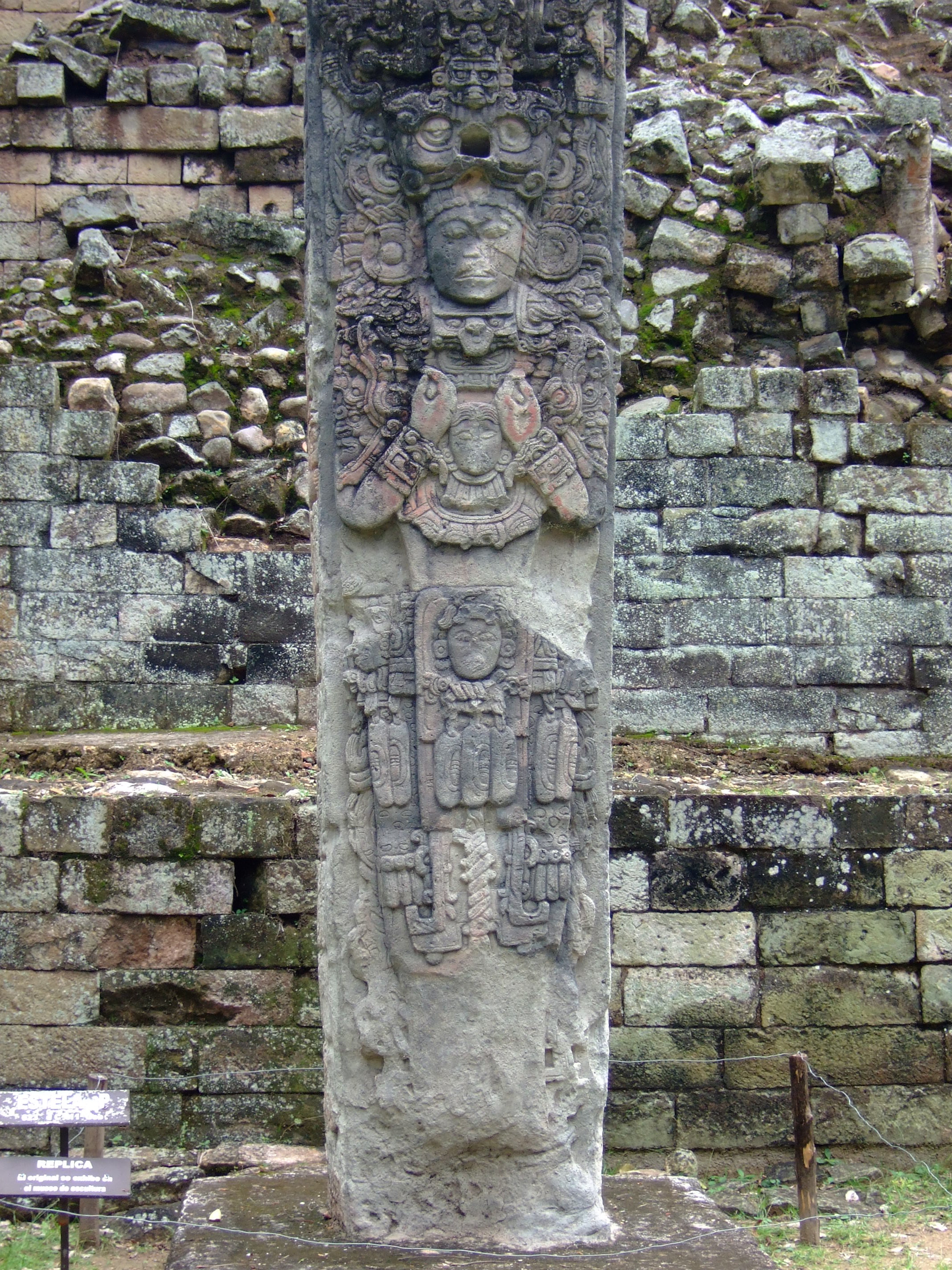
Stela P at Copán, depicting Quirigua's Kʼakʼ Chan Yopaat.

=== Political implications ===
It is unlikely that a polity only one-tenth the size of Copan could overthrow centuries of regional hegemony by acting alone. Stela I at Quirigua states that in 736, two years before Uaxaclajuun Ubʼaah Kawiil's defeat and two years after the inscription declaring Quirigua's independence, Kʼakʼ Tiliw Chan Yopaat hosted a delegation from the polity of Calakmul, including its ruler Wamaw Kʼawiil. This suggests that Calakmul played a role in Copan's defeat, possibly even providing the armed forces necessary to overpower a polity the size of Copan. Calakmul's possible motives include control of important trade routes, but more importantly striking a blow against its rival polity Tikal, Copan's greatest ally.

=== Aftermath ===
The effects of Uaxaclajuun Ubʼaah Kawiil's death were profound. After an era of unprecedented architectural and sculptural achievement, no new structures or monuments were erected for 18 years after Copan's defeat. Kʼakʼ Joplaj Chan Kʼawiil succeeded Uaxaclajuun Ubʼaah Kawiil as ruler of Copan, but his was likely under Kʼak Tiliw Chan Yopaat's jurisdiction. Inscriptions at Quirigua name Kʼak Tiliw Chan Yopaat as the 14th ruler in the line of the founder, a possible reference to him as successor of Uaxaclajuun Ubʼaah Kawiil. At the very least, the loss of the Quirigua trade routes would have meant a substantial economic and political setback.
