= 504 =

Calendar year

504 in various calendars
- Gregorian calendar: 504; DIV
- Ab urbe condita: 1257
- Assyrian calendar: 5254
- Balinese saka calendar: 425–426
- Bengali calendar: −90 – −89
- Berber calendar: 1454
- Buddhist calendar: 1048
- Burmese calendar: −134
- Byzantine calendar: 6012–6013
- Chinese calendar: 癸未年 (Water Goat); 3201 or 2994 — to — 甲申年 (Wood Monkey); 3202 or 2995
- Coptic calendar: 220–221
- Discordian calendar: 1670
- Ethiopian calendar: 496–497
- Hebrew calendar: 4264–4265
- Hindu calendars
- Vikram Samvat: 560–561
- Shaka Samvat: 425–426
- Kali Yuga: 3604–3605
- Holocene calendar: 10504
- Iranian calendar: 118 BP – 117 BP
- Islamic calendar: 122 BH – 121 BH
- Javanese calendar: 390–391
- Julian calendar: 504; DIV
- Korean calendar: 2837
- Minguo calendar: 1408 before ROC 民前1408年
- Nanakshahi calendar: −964
- Seleucid era: 815/816 AG
- Thai solar calendar: 1046–1047
- Tibetan calendar: ཆུ་མོ་ལུག་ལོ་ (female Water-Sheep); 630 or 249 or −523 — to — ཤིང་ཕོ་སྤྲེ་ལོ་ (male Wood-Monkey); 631 or 250 or −522

City of Copán during the Maya civilization

Year 504 (DIV) was a leap year starting on Thursday of the Julian calendar. At the time, it was known as the Year of the Consulship of Nicomachus without colleague (or, less frequently, year 1257 Ab urbe condita). The denomination 504 for this year has been used since the early medieval period, when the Anno Domini calendar era became the prevalent method in Europe for naming years.

== Events ==
=== By place ===
==== Byzantine Empire ====
- War with Sassanid Persia: Emperor Anastasius I gains the upper hand in Armenia, with the renewed investment of Amida.
- King Kavadh I hands over the fortress-city of Amida, and agrees to an armistice with the Byzantine Empire.

==== Europe ====
- King Theodoric the Great defeats the Gepids, and drives them out of their homeland (Pannonia).
- The Ostrogoths sack Belgrade, on the Danube and Sava rivers (modern Serbia).

==== Mesoamerica ====
- A major expansion of Copán's ceremonial center, the Acropolis complex, is undertaken by B'alam Nehn (Waterlily Jaguar), the seventh ruler (ajaw) of the southeastern Maya city (approximate date).

=== By topic ===
==== Religion ====
- Theodoric the Great builds the Basilica of Sant'Apollinare Nuovo, originally dedicated to Christ the Redeemer.

== Deaths ==
- Muyal Jol, ruler of Copan
