= Copán Altar Q =

Altar Q
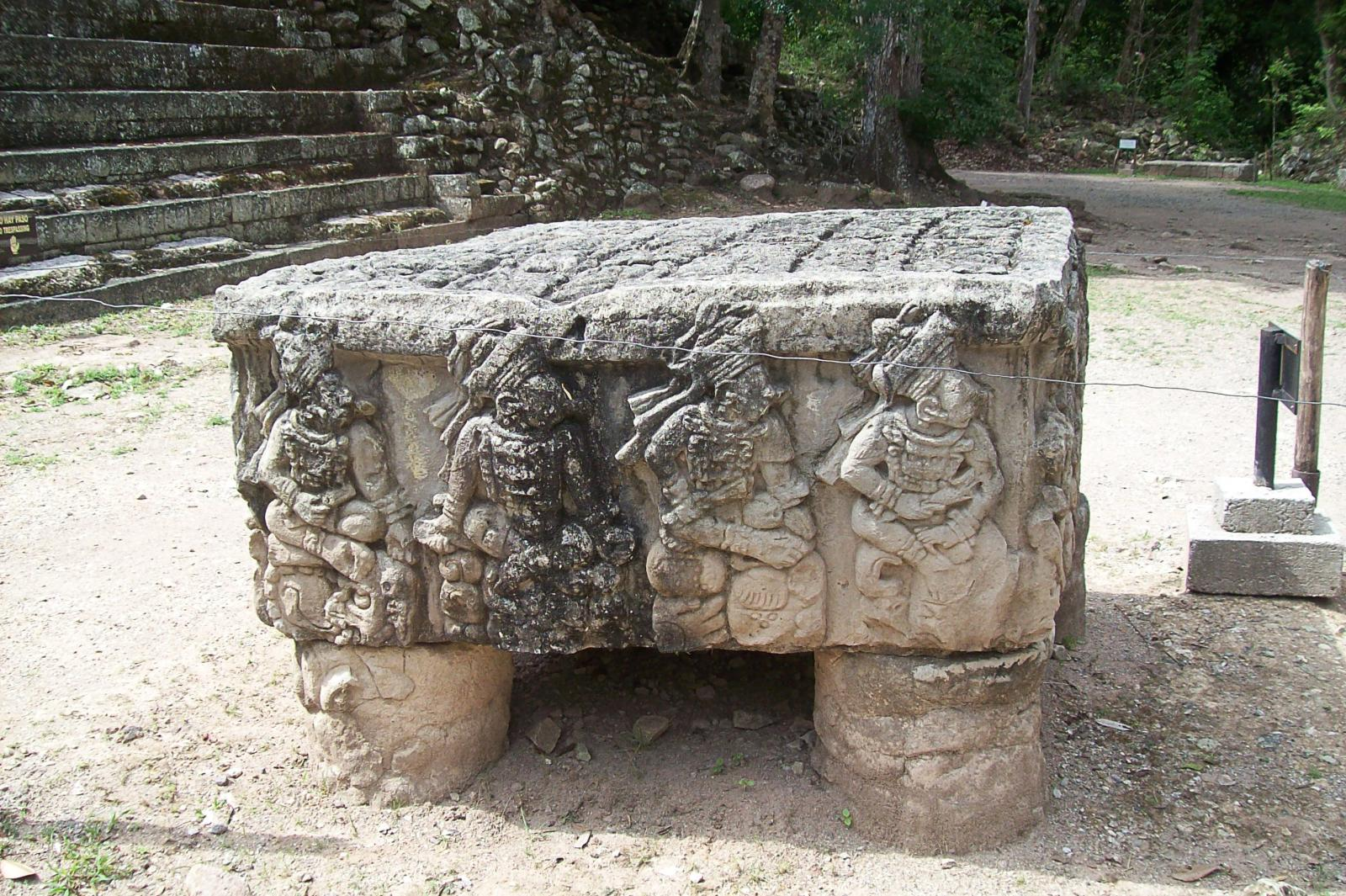
- Altar Q at Copán.
- Created: 776 at Copán (Honduras)
- Present location: Copán Sculpture Museum

Altar Q is the designation given to one of the most notable of the rectangular sculpted stone blocks (dubbed "altars") recovered at the Mesoamerican archaeological site of Copán, which is in present-day Honduras.

Copán was a major Maya civilization center during the Classic period of Mesoamerican chronology, and Altar Q records a dynastic lineage for the Copán-based polity in the Maya script. It was created during the rule of King Yax Pac (also known as Yax Pasaj Chan Yoaat) in 776. Each of the sixteen leaders of Copan are shown with a full body portrait, four on each side of the monument. It starts with Yax K'uk' Mo', who ruled starting in 426 AD, and extends through 763 AD, ending with Yax Pasaj Chan Yoaat. Therefore, the monument's depictions span 350 years of time. Each ruler is seated on a glyph that represents his name, except for the dynastic founder Yax K'uk' Mo', who is seated on the glyph for "lord", and whose name is given in his headdress. Yax Kuk Mo is shown handing down the insignia of reign to Yax Pac. This was a form of propaganda, intended to show that Yax Pac was just as worthy of rule as the first leader.

The name Altar Q was given by Alfred P. Maudslay who conducted the first archeological exploration of the site in 1886. At that time the altar was located at the bottom of the staircase in Structure 16, the central pyramid in Copán's acropolis. It has subsequently been moved to the Copán Sculpture Museum.

== Inscription ==
According to David Stuart:

The inscription on the top of Altar Q really tells the story about Yax K'uk Mo' and how he came to Copan. It begins with a reference to a day in the early 400s, when it says that he took the emblems of office at a place that we think is connected somehow to Teotihuacan or with Central Mexico somewhere. Three days later, it says, he comes from that place. He leaves that very spot. And then the inscription goes on to say something really remarkable. A hundred and fifty three days after he leaves, apparently Central Mexico, he rests his legs. And then it says he is a West Lord, and that's a title that he has throughout the Copan inscriptions throughout history. And then finally, the last two glyphs of the passage read "Hu'li Uxwitikî," "he arrived at Copan." So there's no question in my mind that K'Inich Yax K'uk Mo' became a king at a very far away spot in Central Mexico and brought those emblems of office back here to Copan to found the dynasty.

According to Linda Manzanilla:

In 378 a group of Teotihuacanos organized a coup d'etat in Tikal, Guatemala. This was not the Teotihuacan state; it was a group of the Feathered-Serpent people, thrown out from the city. The Feathered-Serpent Pyramid was burnt, all the sculptures were torn from the temple, and another platform was built to efface the facade ...

== See also ==
- Copán Bench Panel

== Literature ==
- Gerd Sdouz: Altar Q – Copan, Honduras. Verlag Berger, Horn/Vienna 2015. ISBN 978-3-85028-680-0. (bilingual [German/English]; summarizes the latest research about Altar Q, including a review of the as yet lost records from Juan Galindo, the first researcher who extensively documented the Maya site in 1834.
