= Noteboom =

Noteboom, Notenboom and Nooteboom are Dutch surnames originally meaning "nut tree". Notable people with those names include:

Noteboom

- Daniël Noteboom (1910–1932), Dutch chess player
- Erin Noteboom (born 1972), American-born Canadian author with the pen name "Eric Bow"
- Joshua Noteboom, a.k.a. Josh One, American DJ
- Joseph Noteboom (born 1995), American football player
- Stephen Noteboom (born 1969), Dutch tennis player

Notenboom

- Bernice Notenboom (born 1962), Dutch climate journalist and adventurer
- Francis Notenboom (born 1957), Belgian archer
- Harrij Notenboom (born 1926), Dutch politician

Nooteboom

- Ad Nooteboom (1928–2023), Dutch Secretary of Finance 1977–80
- Cees Nooteboom (1933–2026), Dutch novelist, poet, and journalist
- Govert Nooteboom (1930–2012), Dutch chemist and politician
- Hans Peter Nooteboom (1934–2022), Dutch botanist

== See also ==
- Nooteboom (company), Dutch oversize load trailer company founded in 1881 by Willem Nooteboom
- Nottebohm, German surname of the same origin
