= Margarita Tomb =

The Margarita Tomb, also known as The Queens tomb, lies buried deep in the center of the Late Classic Acropolis of Copán, Honduras. It is a multi – leveled tomb with one of the largest caches ever found associated with the burial of a Maya woman.

== History ==
In the valley of Copán, in western Honduras, the maya civilization ruled for hundreds of years. However, not much is known about the region before dynasty 5 and the first king, K'inich Yax K'uk' Mo'. K'inich Yax K'uk' Mo' (also known as Green Quetzal Macaw) ruled from 426 c.e. to around 435 c.e. He died shortly before the 9th Baktun (also spelled Bak'tun) in the Mesoamerican Long Count Calendar. When originally dug up in 1993, the Margarita Tomb was thought to belong to that of K'inich Popol Hol, the son and predecessor of K'inich Yax K'uk' Mo'. Over years of excavation it was discovered that this was a tomb of a woman because of the remains found, which were covered in cinnabar and hematite. One archaeologist Robert J. Sharer along with his colleagues who were on the dig, believe the remains are of the wife of the founder of Copán, K'inich Yax K'uk' Mo'. Because she was found covered in the red cinnabar she is also known as "The Lady in Red." Her burial is very close to the Hunal tomb, where he is buried, and the large number of items found in the tomb suggests a royal burial.

== Layout of the tomb ==
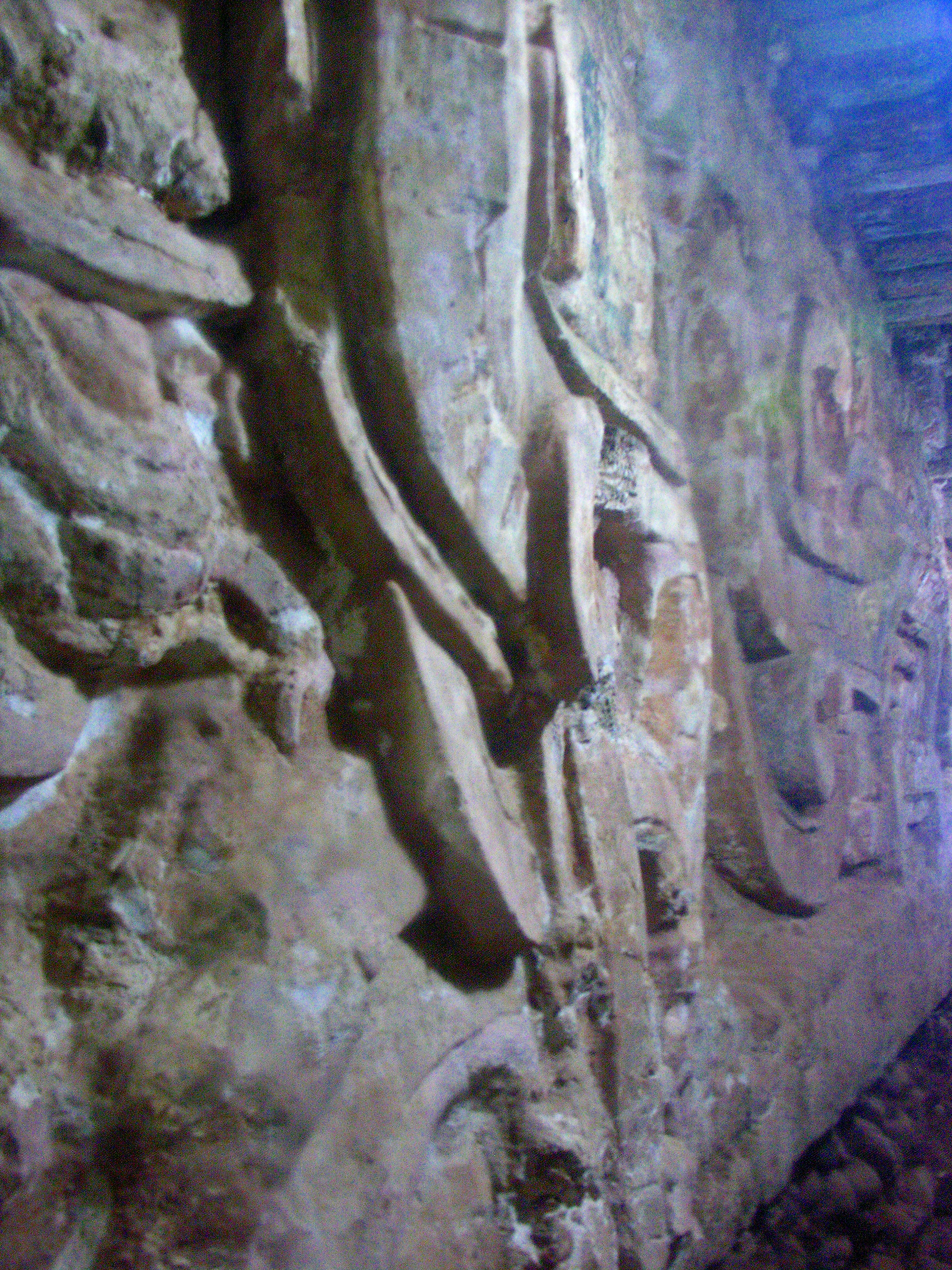
Tunnels that lead to the tomb.

Offerings were scattered across the floor at the entrance of the tomb. Connecting the upper chamber to the lower chamber is a vaulted stairway. In the lower chamber a funerary slab was found. Not long after the woman was buried, the temple was partially demolished and a chamber connected to the crypt's access stairway was created. "This was the scene for rites of remembrance and tomb re-entry that continued even after the building of yet another surmounting platform, Chilan." Martin and Grube Then when the tomb was sealed completely it received another large cache of offerings.

=== Items found in the tomb and their significance ===
A large and multifaceted offering sat in situ (being in the original position; not having been moved) when the funerary slab was removed. In it were over 2000 objects, including a painted basket, bone needles, vessels containing the remains of food jade beads, seashells, shell rings, painted gourds filled with cinnabar, two small grinding stones, jade mosaic mother-of-pearl ear flares, two pyrite mirrors and organic wrappings that were most likely textiles.

One very important piece was called the "Dazzler" (Martin & Grube). it was a tripod vessel with lid that was done in a Teotihuacan style. However it did not contain any information that pertained to the identity of the woman.

Another important artifact pulled from the tomb was a stucco basket that had a lid with a fine-line poly-chrome design on it. However it had flipped off its base and onto a neighboring object where over time it buckled. The archaeologists involved with the project however were able to lift the best preserved part and see a figure in profile wearing a decorated maya headdress. It was similar to those depicted on monuments outside the tomb around Copán. The basket the lid originally sat on revealed strands of jade beads, needles made of bone, and hand carved shell rings. Some of the rings had faces, with eyes of inlaid jade. There were no other burials found in Copán with these rings in these quantities. Stingray spines, possibly used for blood letting and baskets were preserved below the strands of jade and rings. These items were 1500 years old.

Two mirrors made of polished pyrite were found in the burial chamber as well. While mostly eroded, the faint painted design on the back indicated that the back was elaborately painted. There were small yellow dots and stars with other colored fine-line designs. Although difficult to see the archaeologist determined that these were the same designs that they found on the "Dazzler" that they found in the upper chamber in a Teotihuacan design. This design was also found in the neighboring Hunal tomb. One mirror was less eroded and depicted a figure in profile with speech scroll, an object of some sort in his hand and the rim was decorated with a serpent which was important in Maya culture. These mirrors were most likely worn with cords as necklaces.

Needle kits with needles made of bone were found stained a blue-green color. While it could have been a "tool-kit", Mayanist Linda Schele suggested that there were far too many needles for one woman and suggests that they may have been symbolic parts of a burial costume that had the woman depicted as a Moon Goddess.

All of these items become important because their designs were influenced heavily by Teotihuacan in highland Mexico, the Peten in Guatemala (mostly Tikal) and areas like Kaminaljuyu indicate the contact between many Maya cultures and the cultural diffusion that must have taken place.

== Importance of the Tomb ==
This tomb was important to Maya culture because it is one of the largest tombs with the largest caches associated with a woman's burial in all of Mesoamerican cultures. This woman was of high importance to her community and/or was royalty. She may have been the first mother in a nascent line that carried on for centuries. This tomb also shows the diffusion between the different Maya cultures and other cultures near them.

== See also ==
- Copán
- Maya society
- Maya religion
- Mesoamerican culture
- Mesoamerican architecture
- Gender Roles in Mesoamerica
- Jade use in Mesoamerica
