= Elmenhorst =

Elmenhorst may refer to the following places in Germany:

- Elmenhorst, Nordvorpommern, a municipality in the district Nordvorpommern, Mecklenburg-Vorpommern
- Elmenhorst/Lichtenhagen, a municipality in the district of Bad Doberan, Mecklenburg-Vorpommern
- Elmenhorst, Lauenburg, a municipality in the district of Lauenburg, Schleswig-Holstein
- Elmenhorst, Stormarn, a municipality in the district of Stormarn, Schleswig-Holstein

Elmenhorst is the family name of the following persons:

- Elmenhorst (family), a dynasty of freemen in Westphalia and an old Hamburg mercantile family
- Geverhart Elmenhorst (1583–1621), German philologist
- Heinrich Elmenhorst (a.k.a. Hinrich; 1632–1704), German theologian, composer of hymns and opera libretti
- Hinrich Christian Elmenhorst (1726–1779), German merchant and shipping partner
- Johann Hinrich Oswald Elmenhorst (1930–2011), German chemist
- Kurt Wolfram Carlos Elmenhorst (1910–2000), German merchant and Maya researcher
- Wilhelm Ludwig Geverhart Elmenhorst (1890–1964), German ethnologist and Africa researcher

See also

- SS Elmenhorst, A Hansa A Type cargo ship in service in 1945
