= Gender roles in pre-Columbian Mesoamerica =

Gender roles existed in Mesoamerica, with a sexual division of labour meaning that women took on many domestic tasks including child-rearing and food preparation while only men were typically allowed to use weapons and assume positions of leadership. Both men and women farmed, but in some societies, women were not permitted to plough the fields because it was believed to symbolise men's role in the reproductive cycle.

Evidence also suggests the existence of gender ambiguity and fluidity in pre-Columbian Mesoamerican civilizations. Gender relations and functions also varied among Mesoamerican cultures and societies over time and depending on social status. Mesoamerica or Meso-America (Spanish: Mesoamérica) is a region and culture area in the Americas, extending approximately from central Mexico to Honduras and Nicaragua, within which a number of pre-Columbian societies flourished before the Spanish colonization of the Americas in the 16th and 17th centuries. The stereotype that women play a minimal role in the family is far from accurate. Although women's roles in agriculture have been underestimated, if it were not for the contributions of women in agriculture, the family would not survive.

With the arrival of the Spanish and their subsequent viceregal rule starting in the 16th century, Mesoamerican gender relations could no longer be considered distinct cultural practices. Gender roles and gender relations instead became subject to the practices of Spanish viceregal rule and the caste system. However, despite suppression by Spanish colonialization, aspects of pre-Columbian Mesoamerican gender roles have survived in indigenous communities to this day.

== Roles ==
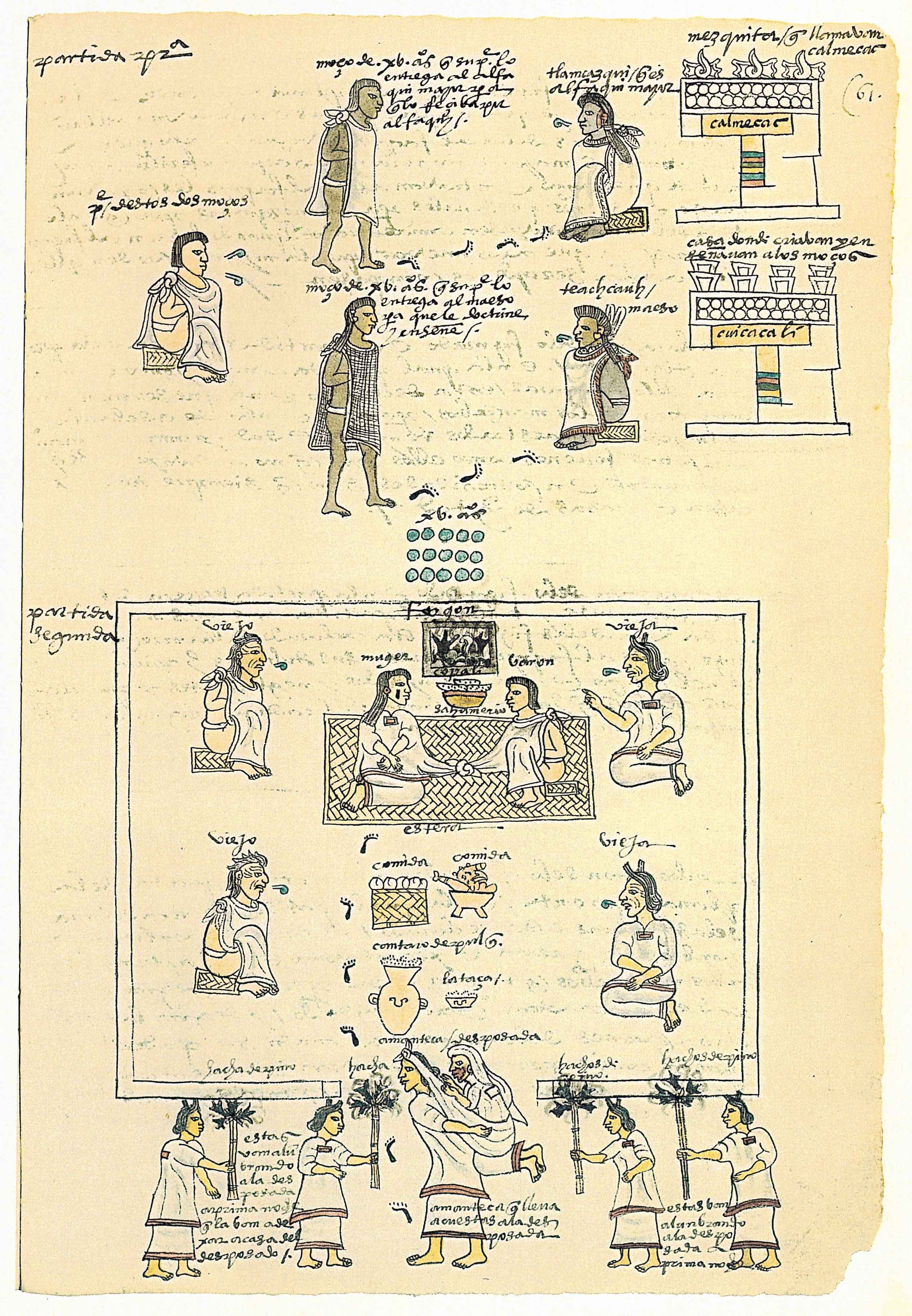
A page from the Codex Mendoza shows 15-year-old Mexica boys being trained for the military or priesthood and a 15-year-old girl getting married.

=== Labor ===
Pre-Columbian Mesoamerican arts contain evidence of a gendered division of labor, depicting women engaged in domestic labor such as weaving, childrearing, tending to animals, and giving birth. Weaving was more strongly associated with gender for the Classic Mexica than the Classic Maya, for which it indicated class. Men were depicted with weapons and in positions of religious and political authority. While evidence suggests that farming was seen as a male activity, the gendered divisions of labor may not have been so strict. Analysis of the bones of women revealed evidence of wear patterns strongly associated with the repetitive motion of grinding maize, suggesting women were primarily engaged in that labor. Anthropologists such as Miranda Stockett believe it is likely that men, women, and children all participated in farming and domestic labor to varying degrees.

Women also hold a variety of roles within the family. These range from harvesting the grains and preparing the food for the family to taking care of the domesticated animals. When examining the role women play in planting and harvesting, one notices that this area still holds some stereotypes about how women aid their husbands. In some societies, women are responsible for sowing and harvesting crops but are restricted from ploughing. The roles shared between men and women in agriculture in Santa Rosa, Yucatán. Although women are allocated such tasks as sowing, with all its association with fertility, they are rigidly excluded from ploughing. The significance of not allowing women to plough is related to human reproduction. The common belief is that women should not be able to plough because it invades the male's role in human reproduction. Thus, men are able to carry out all stages of the agriculture cycle, including the planting of the seed, while women—even in their role as head of the household—are sanctioned to rely upon men for particular tasks. The reasoning behind limiting women's roles in the production of the crops is directly related to reproduction. Women rely on men for some tasks when planting crops, just as women need the assistance of men in reproduction.

Aside from producing food, another important task that women carry out is food preparation, which demands the most attention because the women must sit by the hearth for long periods of time. In the role women have in the preparation of maize, after the grains have been harvested, the next step is to process them so the family can consume them. Apart from childbearing and childrearing, one of the women's foremost duties was the processing of dried corn into maize flour. After being boiled with lime, softened maize kernels were ground with a tubular hand stone on a flat grinding stone (metate) into maize dough. Once the dough is formed, a variety of food items can be made. Here the metate plays an important role in the processing of maize, the staple crop of the culture.

The last major role women hold in a society relates to animals. Many households have corrals for their domestic animals, and this is another area that women are responsible for. When discussing the roles women play with domestic animals the corral is very important to the women of the household and is another area where they spend a great deal of their time. Here she spent a good part of her time, taking care of the animals…caring for the chickens, cleaning the dovecote, feeding the mule, rabbits…here in the corral one eats from one’s work.

Women play an important role in the survival of their families because the family survives from the work they perform in the corral.

Additionally, the success of Mesoamerican rituals was dependent on the production of food and textiles, to which women contributed much labor. These rituals were vital to ensuring good relationships with not only the gods but also within communities. In Relación de las cosas de Yucatán, Diego de Landa observed that for nearly all rituals, Mayan women were responsible for preparing food for both offerings and consumption in addition to the cloth as offerings.

Gender relations among the Mexica also suggested gender complementarity. For example, dying in battle and dying in childbirth elevated men and women respectively. In childbirth, women confront the goddess Cihuacoatl, and if they died, their bodies were considered temporarily imbued with the power of the goddess. Since parts of their bodies could be used as a protective amulet or to curse others, the husband kept vigil by her body for four nights.

In regards to specific Mesoamerican midwives, Aztec midwives were known as the tlamatlquicitl. These midwives provided unique ways of giving birth which involved medical assistance, analgesics or pain relief medications, and religious rituals. For pregnant Aztec women, their part of the pregnancy included some kind of ritual and was also defined by the hygiene they had. Most midwives, including Mayan ones, were actually all similar when it came to focusing on childbirth.

=== Art and Culture ===
Upper class Aztec society allowed both men and women to be writers, artists, and textile workers. Courtiers of both genders wrote poetry extolling the sovereign's military strength and conquest. One such poet is Macuilxochitzin, the daughter of a prominent noble family. Women could also work as professional artisans and textile workers.

=== Politics ===
Some Mesoamerican women were able to assume roles as political leaders, such as women in Maya society, others such as women in Mexica society were not. However while Mexican women couldn't serve in this capacity, they were given equal legal and economic rights and noble Mexican women could become priestesses. Additionally, two influential political figures headed the highest levels of the Mexican government. One was the tlatoani, literally "the one who speaks", and another was the cihuacoatl, meaning "woman snake", both representing a male&female pair. The tlatoani were responsible for military affairs and the cihuacoatl was responsible for domestic affairs like the food supply and administering justice. The position of cihuacoatl was in reality occupied by a man, but the associations with femininity were significant enough that the cihuacoatl, of the same name as a goddess, wore a women's dress for ceremonies. As Mesoamerican states became more centralized over time, men's power became more associated with their control over women and their capacity for productive and reproductive labor. As a result, opportunities available to women became limited. In the case of Mexico, military concerns may have eclipsed women's public significance.

=== Gender ambiguity ===
Although pre-Columbian Mesoamerican art contained depictions of the body as male or female as represented by genitalia or secondary sex characteristics, it also included representations of bodies with exposed chests and waists but no visible sexual characteristics. Depictions of rituals conducted by elite Mesoamericans have included women dressed in the traditional costume of men and men dressed in the traditional costume of women.

== See also ==
- Mesoamerica
- Gender in Maya society
- Women rulers in Maya society
- Women in Aztec civilization

== Bibliography ==
- Rosenbaum, Brenda; Christine Eber (2007). "Women and gender in Mesoamerica". In Robert M. Carmack; Janine Gasco; Gary H. Gossen (eds.). The Legacy of Mesoamerica: History and Culture of a Native American Civilization. Exploring Cultures series (2nd ed.). Upper Saddle River, NJ: Pearson/Prentice Hall. ISBN 978-0-13-049292-0. OCLC 71833382.
- Tway, Maria B. (2004). "Gender, Context, and Figurine Use: Ceramic Images from the Formative Period San Andres Site, Tabasco, Mexico" (unpublished Master's thesis). Tallahassee: Dept. of Anthropology, Florida State University. Archived from the original on 2010-11-19.
