= Kurt Wolfram Carlos Elmenhorst =

Carlos W. Elmenhorst (6. April 1910 — 24. October 2000) born Kurt Wolfram Carlos Elmenhorst, was a German merchant, Maya researcher, and collector of Maya textiles.

== Life ==
Carlos W. Elmenhorst was born in Kiel. He was the eldest son of five children of an old Hamburg merchant family. After an apprenticeship with Eduard Ringel & Co im- and exports in Hamburg, a merchant firm specialised in coffee, he decided to leave Germany 1932 for Guatemala, where he was more than 60 years active in the coffee trade business, first from 1933 to 1944 with Nottebohm Hermanos (Gebrüder Nottebohm), later in his own company. Apart from his business as merchant he collected since the 1930s systematically textiles of all Mayas populations in Guatemala, thus assembling one of the most complete collections of Maya textiles in the world.

He donated his collection of more than 1,000 items in 1989 to the Hamburg Museum für Völkerkunde Hamburg, which is showing it since 2011 as Sammlung Elmenhorst in the permanent exhibition.

His library with an abundant collection of antiquarian autographs and contemporary travel and expedition reports about Central America in the 16th century he bequeathed as Carlos Elmenhorst Collection to the Ludwig von Mises library of the Francisco-Marroquín-University in Guatemala City. It is currently being digitalised and will be published online. He died in Guatemala City.
