= Women in Aztec civilization =

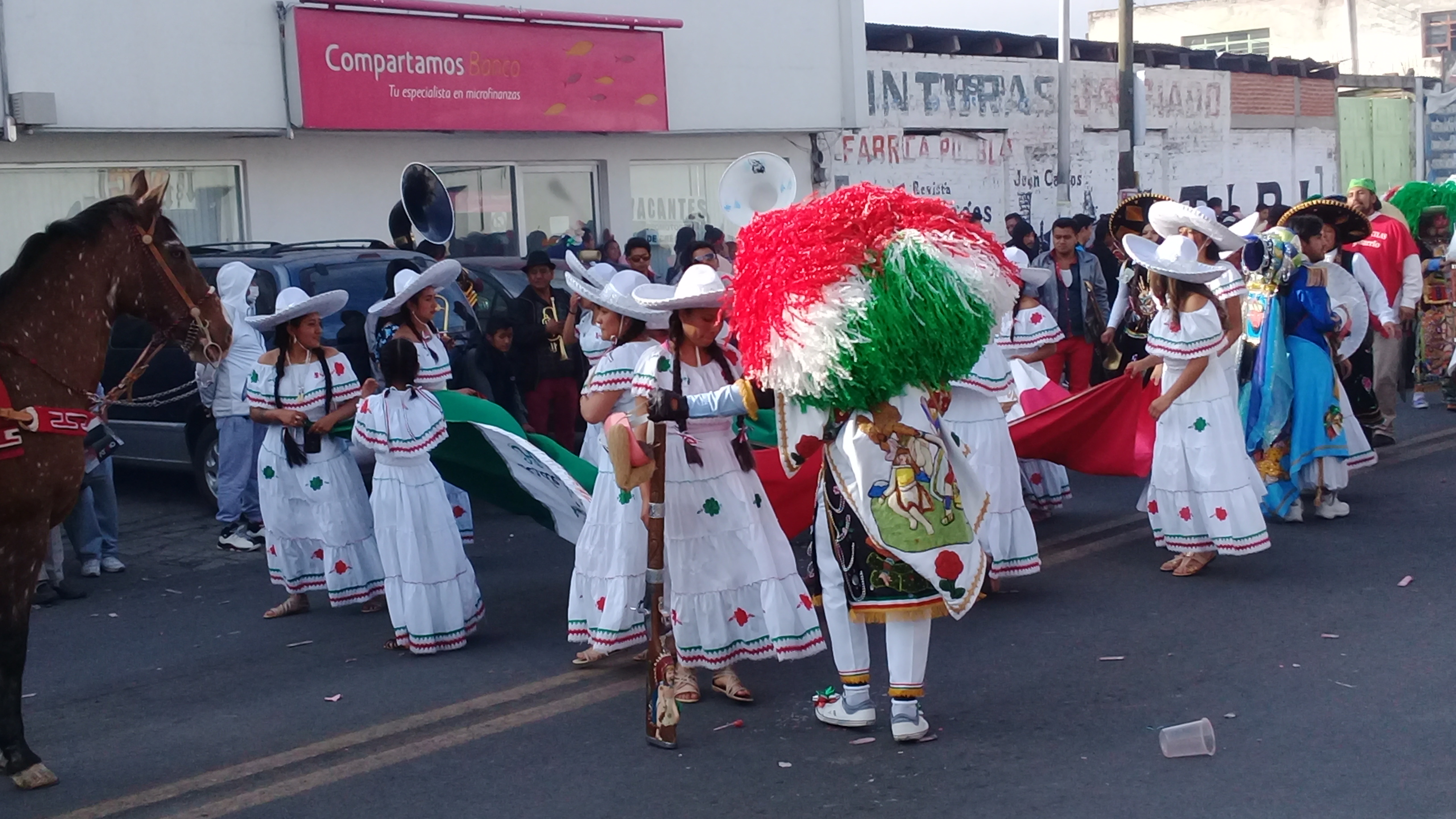
Women in Carnival of Huejotzingo

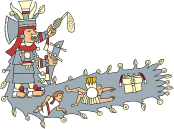
Chalchiuhtlicue was the goddess of water, river and ocean, who also presided over Aztec wedding ceremonies. She is usually shown wearing jade, which symbolizes the femininity; here she holds spinning and weaving tools (image from the Codex Rios).

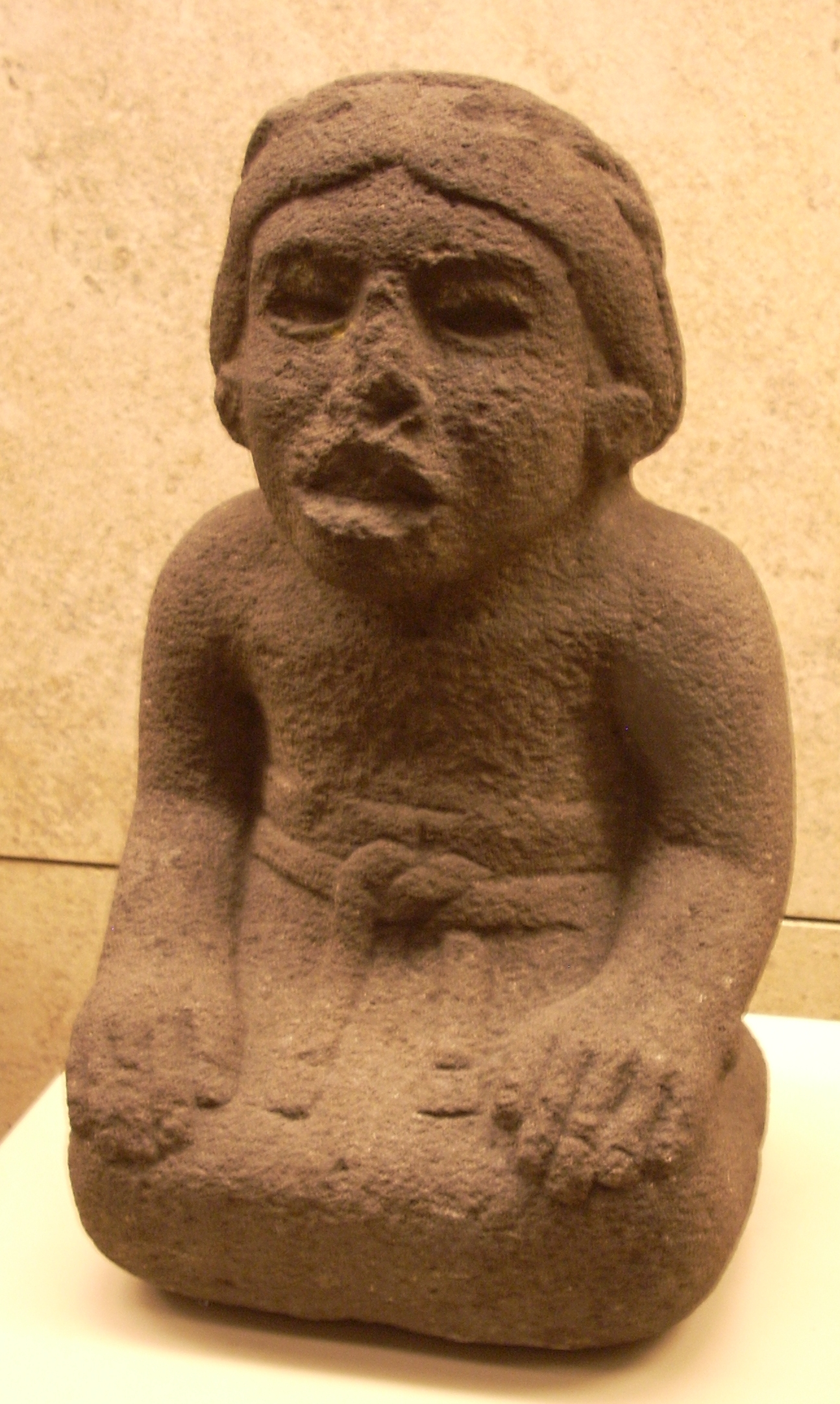
Statue of a kneeling woman, possibly a goddess (1300 to 1521 CE).

Women in Aztec civilization shared some equal opportunities. Aztec civilization saw the rise of a military culture that was closed off to women and made their role more prescribed to domestic and reproductive labor and less equal. The status of Aztec women in society was further altered in the 16th century, when Spanish conquest forced European norms onto the indigenous culture. However, many pre-Columbian norms survived and their legacy still remains.

== History ==
The status of Aztec women has changed throughout the history of the civilization. In the early days of the Aztecs, before they settled in Tenochtitlan, women owned property and had roughly equal legal and economic rights. As an emphasis on warfare increased, so too did ideas of male dominance. Women did not participate in warfare except as prisoners.

== Marriage ==
Aztec marriage practices were similar to those of other Mesoamerican civilizations such as the Maya. Aztecs married at a later age, during their late teens and early twenties.

Aztec marriages were initiated by the parents of the potential groom. After consulting with the extended kinship group, the parents would approach a professional matchmaker (Classical Nahuatl: ah atanzah), who would approach the potential bride's family. The parents of the young woman would advise the matchmaker whether or not they accepted the proposal. Brides were expected to be virgins before marriage, as young people of both sex were advised to be celibate.

The marriage celebration was a four-day event, and the wedding ceremony took place on the first day. The bride would wear fine robes. Her kinswomen would decorate her arms and legs with red feathers, and paint her face with a paste containing small shimmering crystals. The ceremony would take place at the house of the groom's parents. A fire would be lit in the hearth, and incense would be burned as an offering to the gods. The groom's parents would give presents (robes and mantles) to the bride's parents. The ritual for finalizing the marriage involved the matchmaker tying the groom's cape to the bride's skirt, and then the groom's mother would give the bride and groom each four mouthfuls of tamales. Four days of feasting followed the ceremony.

For the purpose of political, military or economic alliances marriages among Aztec nobles were arranged. For example, when Cosijoeza married Ahuitzotl's daughter to seal the alliance between the Aztecs and the Zapotecs in 1496. Aztec kings reportedly had dozens of wives and many children. However, polygamy was only a practice among the nobles of Aztec civilization; the majority of the population were monogamous.

Couples could petition for legal separation for a number of reasons, including incompatibility, infertility, or abuse. Those who were divorced or widowed were allowed to remarry.

== Pregnancy, childbirth, and the tlamatlquiticitl ==
One of the few positions of power women could hold in Aztec society was that of the tlamatlquiticitl, or the midwife. These women were proficient in dealing with difficulties arising during pregnancy and labour but as most of the information we have about their practices is passed on from upper class Aztec men and the Spanish conquerors, much of the traditional knowledge has been lost. A tlamatlquiticitl attended every pregnant woman, no matter what status or class, although women of higher status often had more than one attend them. The tlamatlquiticitl was essential to assisting in birth, and additionally to providing prenatal care advice.

=== Pregnancy ===
The Florentine Codex outlines much of the advice the tlamatlquiticitl gave to expecting mothers. The mother was advised to engage in sex with her husband during the first few months of the pregnancy so as to help the child develop, but around the seventh or eighth month she was to abstain. If she did not it was believed that the semen may act like glue and the baby would not come out, or if it did it would be feeble with misshaped fingers and toes and covered in what looks like atole so that everyone would see how the couple could not abstain, and they would be shamed. The expecting mother was told she must avoid prolonged periods in the sweat bath, for too much heat was thought to roast the child and it would be stuck inside the womb; however, too much heat specifically around the abdomen area would cause the child to swell and suffer from the heat. Chewing chicle was not allowed otherwise the baby would be born with perforated lips and would not be able to suckle or eat. Likewise if she ate earth or chalk the child would be in poor health. The tlamatlquiticitl knew that the baby took nourishment from the mother and so what she ate it would absorb; if she fasted the child would starve. Because of this the mother was to eat and drink well, even after the birth. The mother was warned not to look at anything red otherwise the child would extend crosswise, making for a complicated delivery. She was not allowed to observe lunar eclipses, otherwise the child would be born with a cleft palate. Eclipses were associated with miscarriages. She was not to look at anything that would frighten or anger her lest she should harm the child. Walking around late at night was avoided otherwise the child would cry incessantly. If the mother took naps during the day the tlamatlquiticitl warned that the child would be born with unusually large eyelids. Lifting heavy objects was associated with damaging the fetus. The tlamatlquiticitl told the mother's family that she should not be in want of anything, all her desires should be fulfilled quickly otherwise the child would suffer. Not only did the tlamatlquiticitl provide this advice but she attended and took over household duties for the expectant mother towards the end of the pregnancy. This support, in combination with the advice on stress management, such as avoiding stressful relationships, and the suggestion to not lift heavy objects or overwork themselves, helped to contribute to the healthy psychological development of their children.

=== Labor ===
Because the tlamatlquiticitl resided in the house, the mother would have been well prepared for the birth. If the child presented in breech position the tlamatlquiticitl, who was skilled in massage, would take the mother into a sweat bath and massage the womb to turn the baby around. The typical position for labour was squatting, as gravity would assist as the child was being pushed out. To induce labour the tlamatlquiticitl would at first give the mother Montanoa tomentosa, and failing that, they would then administer a drink made from possum tail, that was shown to prompt contractions. In modern clinical trials, many of these mixtures have been proven to have induced contractions. The Spanish Friars believed these concoctions to be witchcraft, and since both ritualistic and natural elements were used by the tlamatlquiticitl, the Spanish decided the tlamatlquiticitl was evil and eradicated these practices.

The act of birthing was considered a battle and the tlamatlquiticitl would give the mother a miniature shield and spear for the fight. When the baby was born, the midwife would make a series of battle cries, praising the mother who had fought through her labour to deliver the baby. The tlamatlquiticitl would cut the umbilical cord which connects the child to its mother and the gods, and it would be dried. After the placenta came out it was taken and buried in a corner of the house by the tlamatlquiticitl. Then the preserved umbilical cords were buried, and according to the Spanish accounts, they would be buried near a battlefield if the child was a boy or beneath the hearth if it was a girl, to indicate their futures. According to the birthing almanacs such as the Codex Yoalli Ehēcatl the umbilical cord was planted to ensure the relationship between the gods and child.

=== Complications ===
If the child died in childbirth, the tlamatlquiticitl would employ an obsidian knife to remove the fetus in pieces so as not to harm the mother. The tlamatlquiticitl would warn the mother not to be troubled by the loss of her child otherwise the spirit of the child would suffer. Scholars argue, with evidence based in bioarcheology, that this same method was also used to perform abortions, although they were generally frowned upon. The life of the mother was the priority over saving the fetus if the situation was life-threatening, and if the mother was at risk, then the fetus would be dismembered so she would survive. Women who died during childbirth were given the same honour as a soldier who was slain in battle, and were portrayed as spirits known as cihuateteo.

=== Post-partum ===
After delivery the tlamatlquiticitl would remain in the house so as to help the mother and monitor her milk supply. Since the child would not begin weaning until after 24 months, this was an important process. These four days of monitoring also were to ensure a speedy recovery of the mother, and so the tlamatlquiticitl would prepare baths and meals for her. After this period, the bathing ceremony would take place.

The Codex Mendoza depicts the bathing ceremony, which was conducted by the tlamatlquiticitl, four days after the birth. The child was washed in an earthenware tub on a rush mat and on each side were symbols, one for boys and the other for girls. For girls the three objects had to do with homemaking: a basket, a broom, and a spindle. And there were five objects for boys, which had to do with male professions: an obsidian blade representing a featherworker, a brush for a scribe, an awl that carpenters work with, a tool used by goldsmiths, and shields with a bow and arrow for a warrior. The tlamatlquiticitl circled around the mat counter-clockwise with the child, washed the child, and then shouted out the name she has chosen for the child as she presented it to the gods. The water she used to cleanse the outside and inside of the body does not serve the same symbolic function that it does in a Christian baptism, but rather it is used to arouse the spirit of the child and let the gods in. The Codex Yoallo Ehēcatl depicts this bathing ceremony as performed by the gods, but it is understood that the tlamatlquiticitl impersonated the gods while performing these rituals because they so closely resemble what is depicted. For example, the Yoallo Ehēcatl shows images of the gods presenting the children as well as cutting the umbilical cord. After the ceremony the tlamatlquiticitl would swaddle the child and give a speech to the mother on how valiantly she had fought and how it was time for rest. Kinsmen were then invited to see the child and praise the mother, which concluded a successful birth. Also, Chalchiuhtlicue, a goddess of water, was in charge of the birth ritual, because water was the object of expectation for a baby girl. Since water has a feature to move flexibly, water was thought to imply the origin of movements.

=== Multiple births ===
In the Aztec culture, a pregnancy resulting in more than one child was regarded as an omen towards the well being of the parents. Soon after birth, one (or more depending on how many children were born) would be slain to protect the parents. Despite this negative connotation towards twins or multiples, many Aztec creation myths begin with twins, such as Quetzalcoatl, the god of wind and learning. His name contains the Aztec word for twin (coatl).

== Women and labor ==
Women mainly worked inside the home, spinning and weaving thread from cotton, henepen, or maquey agave. They used a handheld drop spindle, then wove cloth using a loom that they strapped to their backs and held in their laps. They were responsible for tending turkeys and dogs that were raised for meat. Extra cloth, vegetables or other items were taken by women to the nearest market to be sold or bartered for a needed item.

One of the most important roles of Aztec women in the home was to prepare maize flour for making tortillas, an important tradition for Mexican families today. Dried maize was soaked in lime water, a process known as nixtamalization, and the nixtamalized grains ground. As part of Aztec etiquette, men ate before women.

Women had a number of other professions in Aztec civilization, including priest, doctor, sorcerer. Women were often recognized in their civilization as professional weavers and crafters.

Images in Aztec codices, ceramics and sculptures display the elaborate and colorful designs of Aztec weavers. There were regional textile specialties, with associated graphic designs. Most designs were geometric, with some regions specializing in textiles with animal and plant images. Cotton was generally used, and dyes came from blue clays, yellow ochres, and red came from insects living in nopal cacti. Purple was derived from the sea snail Purpura patula, similar to how the Phoenicians also derived purple dye used for royal robes from snails.

Unlike the men, Aztec women were not forced to participate in the military. They were not put into military school as young children like all of their male counterparts. This meant that while women were denied access to one of the largest sources of wealth and prestige within Aztec society, they were less likely to be killed in battle.

== Spanish rule ==
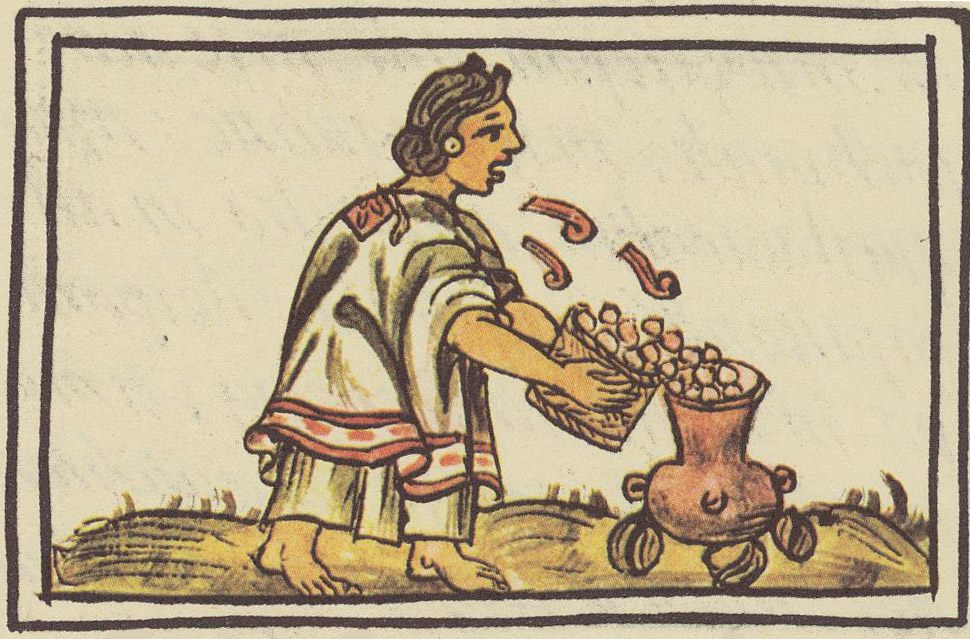
Illustration of an Aztec woman blowing on maize (corn) before putting it into the cooking pot, so that it will not fear the fire. From the late 16th-century Florentine Codex

The Spanish conquest of Aztec territories decreased much of the indigenous population through warfare and foreign disease, such as smallpox, for which the Aztecs had no immunities. The surviving population was confronted by profound attacks upon their culture in the form of Spanish institutions such as the Roman Catholic religion.

As early as 1529, the Spanish began coercively converting Aztecs to Catholicism. They focused on the Aztec nobility initially, to create an example for the other Aztecs to follow. Nobles such as Quetzalmacatzin, King of Amaquemecan (Chalco), were forced to choose one wife and abandon the others, to comply with the current Christian institution of marriage, which meant monogamy. Aztec polygamous arrangements, with secondary wives and children, were not legally recognized by the Spanish, who considered such women and children illegitimate and disinherited from claims to ranks or property. This also tore apart the political and economic fabric of Aztec culture, since noble marriages were made with political and territorial claims in mind.

Working demands became harsh for women after the Spanish arrived and the encomiendas were created. Aztec communities had already lost many men to war and epidemics, and the encomiendas meant that more men worked outside of their villages for the encomenderos. Traditional gender-based divisions of labour became irrelevant. Women no longer had men to do plowing, and were left to do all the agricultural tasks themselves, which included the planting and harvesting, as well as growing enough produce to meet the tribute demands of the encomiendas. Over several generations, many young women left the rural areas to work as domestic servants or as market vendors in the cities.

When the Spanish eventually set up industrial textile mills, they had only men working in the mills. The new Spanish culture prohibited women working outside of their home as their priority was to raise children.
