= SS Kazan =

History
- Name: Elmenhorst (1943-45); Empire Galleon (1945-46); Kazan (1946-73)
- Owner: Godeffroy & Co (1943-45); Ministry of War Transport (1945-46); Soviet government (1946-73)
- Operator: Godeffroy & Co (1945); Kindiesel Shipping Co. Ltd (1945-46); Soviet government (1946-73)
- Port of registry: (Nazi Germany) Hamburg, Germany (1943-45); London, United Kingdom (1945-46); Soviet Union (1946-73)
- Builder: Van Vliet & Co
- Yard number: 502
- Launched: 22 December 1943
- Completed: April 1945
- Out of service: 1973
- Identification: United Kingdom Official Number 180595 (1945-46); Code Letters GJKL (1945-46); IMO number: 6718996 ( –1973)
- Fate: Scrapped

General characteristics
- Class & type: Hansa A type Cargo ship
- Tonnage: 1,925 GRT, 935 NRT, 3,238 DWT
- Length: 85.22 m (279 ft 7 in)
- Beam: 13.51 m (44 ft 4 in)
- Draught: 5.59 m (18 ft 4 in)
- Depth: 4.80 m (15 ft 9 in)
- Installed power: Compound steam engine, 1,200IHP
- Propulsion: Single screw propeller
- Speed: 10.5 knots (19.4 km/h)

Kazan (Russian: Каза́нь) was a Hansa A Type cargo ship which was built as Elmenhorst in 1943 by Van Vliet & Co, Hardinxveld, Netherlands for Godeffroy & Co, Hamburg, Germany. She was seized as a prize of war in 1945, passing to the Ministry of War Transport and renamed Empire Galleon. She was allocated to the Soviet Union in 1946 and was renamed Kazan. She served until 1973 when she was scrapped.

== Description ==
The ship was 85.22 m (279 ft 7 in) long, with a beam of 13.51 m (44 ft 4 in). She had a depth of 4.80 m (15 ft 9 in), and a draught of 5.59 m (18 ft 4 in). She was assessed as 1,923 GRT, 935 NRT, 3,238 DWT.

The ship was propelled by a compound steam engine, which had two cylinders of 42 cm (16 9/16 inches) and two cylinders of 90 cm (35 7/16 inches) diameter by 90 cm (35 7/16 inches) stroke. The engine was built by Waggon- und Maschinenbau GmbH, Görlitz. Rated at 1,200IHP, it drove a single screw propeller and could propel the ship at 10.5 knots (19.4 km/h).

== History ==
Elmenhorst was a Hansa A Type cargo ship built in 1943 as yard number 502 by Van Vliet & Co., Hardinxveld, Netherlands for Godeffroy & Co, Hamburg. She was launched on 22 December and completed in April 1945. Her port of registry was Hamburg.

In May 1945, Elmenhorst was seized as a prize of war at Kiel. She was passed to the Ministry of War Transport. She was renamed Empire Galleon. The Code Letters GJKL and United Kingdom Official Number 180595 were allocated. Her port of registry was London and she was operated under the management of the Kindiesel Shipping Co. Ltd, Greenock.

In 1947 Empire Galleon was allocated to the Soviet Union and was renamed Kazan. With their introduction in the 1960s, Kazan was allocated the IMO Number 6718996. She served until 1973 when she was scrapped.
