= Maya textiles =

Clothing of the Maya peoples

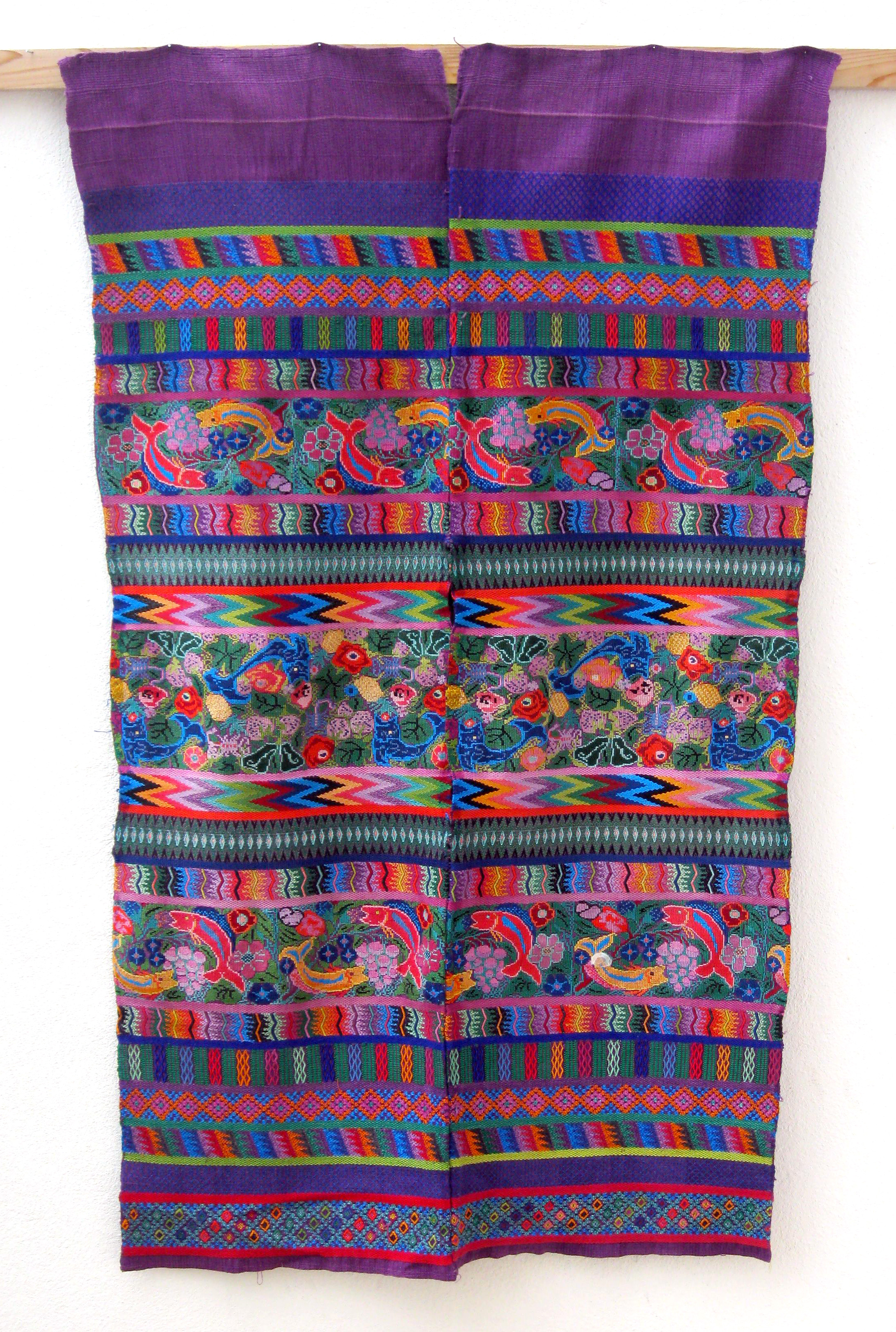
Huipil from the small town of San Antonio Aguas Calientes, Guatemala

Maya textiles (k’apak) are the clothing and other textile arts of the Maya peoples, indigenous peoples of the Yucatán Peninsula in Mexico, Guatemala, Honduras, El Salvador and Belize. Women have traditionally created textiles in Maya society, and textiles were a significant form of ancient Maya art and religious beliefs. They were considered a prestige good that would distinguish the commoners from the elite. According to Brumfiel, some of the earliest weaving found in Mesoamerica can date back to around 1000–800 BCE.

== Materials ==
Ancient Maya women had two natural types of cotton to work with, one white and the other light brown, called cuyuscate, both of which were commonly dyed. The preparation of cotton for spinning was very burdensome, as it had to be washed and picked clean of seeds. The cotton was usually associated with the elites.

Elite women were also given the opportunity to work with the most expensive feathers and pearl beads. However, women of the elite not only had to prepare the best clothing for their families, but they also had to be talented in weaving tapestry, brocade, embroidery, and tie-dyeing for tribute to other families and rulers. Weavers had three different natural dyes to work with. Women also worked with maguey. This fiber was, "another commonly spun material, and depending on the species used and the number of production steps, it could produce either cluded human and animal hair (rabbit and dog), feathers, and vegetable fibers such as milkweed and chichicastle, a fibrous nettle native to Southern México, also known as mala mujer." Maguey was of major value as a cordage material used for horse gear, nets, hammocks and bags.

Until the nineteenth century, most dyed threads were naturally dyed but now in current times, Guatemalan weavers prefer and heavily rely on "commercial and handspun yarns dyed with mollusk dye." As stated by Brumfiel, the use of these easier to acquire materials, "reduces the time needed for cloth production by two-thirds to three-quarters..., making it possible for weavers to devote more time to the actual weaving process" when using a backstrap loom. Instead focusing most of their time on creating the dyes and dyeing the cotton or maguey now, mollusk dye or acrylic thread threads speed-up the overall process. Another reason for using chemically dyed threads is because the, "colors are brighter and do not fade with wear, washing and exposure to the sun as readily as do naturally dyed threads."

== Process ==
In woven textiles, the first step is preparing fiber, which can come from plants, such as cotton or maguey, or animals, such as wool from sheep. In Mesoamerica, only plant fibers were used before European contact. The loose fibers are spun into threads by hand, with spindles, a long stick-like device for holding the thread, and whorls, a weight held on the spindle to increase its motion. There were two kinds of looms used for weaving, "the foot loom and the back-strap loom. The latter is almost invariably used by women, who attach one end of the loom to a tree or post and fix the other end behind their lower back. For this reason the width of the textile is constrained by what the particular woman can manage. Until the fairly recent past, foot looms were operated mostly by men, but this practice is changing. The threads are made of cotton, although silk is frequently interwoven with cotton in textiles destined for ceremonial use." After european contact Clothing made from animal skins began to be used by the elites.

In the pre-Columbian era, Mayan women exclusively wove with backstrap looms, that use sticks and straps worn around one's waist to create tension. As written by Mahler:

The backstrap loom, in use before European contact and still used by some weavers today, cannot even exist on its own without the support of a convenient upright at one end and the weaver's body at the other. The weaver controls the tension by the direction in which she moves her body, and opens and closes the sheds in which weft threads are inserted by lifting heddles, placing and rotating the wooden batten, and using other hand-held implements as needed... 'The loom itself appears to be a simple device. When the cloth is completed, nothing remains of the loom except a pile of sticks', yet studies of this technology have argued that it is really 'a complex device, more responsive to the weaver's creative impulses than the modern treadle loom' introduced into the region by the Spanish.

After European contact, treadle looms were introduced, although backstrap looms continue to be popular. There had to be specific bodily discipline, like stillness, balance and kneeling for a long time, in order to use the backstrap looms correctly which would end up defining, "the proper physical comportment for women." Bone picks were used before contact and were unique in that they had different designs for most families and were usually passed on from generation to generation with the elite having the most expensive and beautiful.

== Traditional pre-contact attire ==
In the Maya civilization, a man's typical dress was a cotton breechcloth wrapped around his waist and sometimes a sleeveless shirt, either white or dyed in colours. In the twentieth century traditional male attire was characterized by some articles that were specific to a couple of towns, this included: a saco (wool jacket) or capixaij (tunic), pantalones (trousers), camisa (shirt), belt or banda (sash), and rodillera (wool hip cloth).

A woman typically wore a traje, which combined a huipil and a corte, a woven wraparound skirt that reached her ankles. The traje was held together with a faja or sash worn at the waist. Both women and men wore sandals.

When the weather was temperate, Mayan clothing was needed less as protection from the elements and more for personal adornment. Maya clerics and other dignitaries wore elaborate outfits with jewellery.

Maya farmers wore minimal clothing. Men wore plain loincloths or a band of cloth winded around their waists. Some wore moccasins made of deerhide. Women possessed two items of clothing: a length of ornamented material with holes made for the arms and head, known as a kub. Both genders wore a heavier rectangle of cloth, as a manta, that functioned as an overwrap on cool days, and as blanket at night. The manta also served as a blind across the door.

== Huipil ==
The most prevalent and influential aspect of women's clothing in ancient times is the huipil, which is still prominent in Guatemalan and Mexican culture today. The huipil is a loose rectangular garment with a hole in the middle for the head made from lightweight sheer cotton. The huipil is usually white with colorful cross-stripping and zigzag designs woven into the cloth using the brocade technique still commonly used today. The huipil could be worn loose or tucked into a skirt; this depends on the varying lengths of the huipil. Huipils often are used to display one's religion and/or community affiliation. Different communities tend to have different designs, colors, and lengths as well as particular huipils for ceremonial purposes. It was uncommon and often disgraceful to wear a huipil design from another community within one's village; although, it was a sign of respect to wear a community's huipil when visiting another village. Textiles produced by weavers within Mayan communities tend to have similar recognizable traits unique to that community, however, weavers are not restricted in their creativity. Instead the community design serves as an outline for what women should have, and then within the community design, weavers can implement a variety of personal details to create an individual finished product. One common theme is to express praise to different kiuggkes animals around the collar.

== Hair sash ==
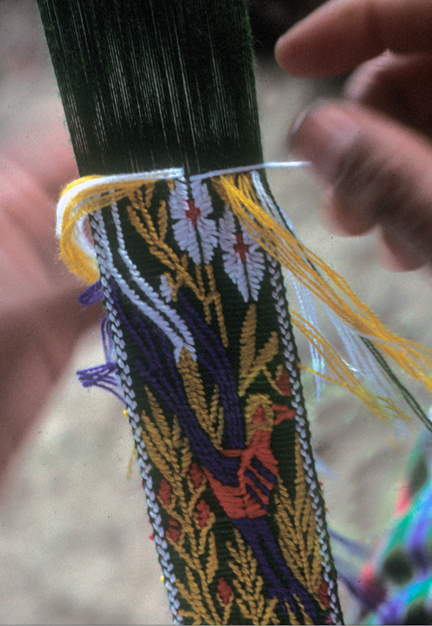
Detail of hair sash being brocaded on a Jakaltek Maya backstrap loom

The hair sash is often the only part of the traditional outfit that is still locally woven by women on a backstrap loom. Each ethnic group not only has their own way of wearing the hair sash interlaced or wrapped around their long hair, but colours, motifs, widths, and the manner of setting up the loom and incorporating the geometric and figurative designs into the cloth are distinct. Elaborate hair sashes woven of finer thread with more complex imagery are worn on special occasions.

== Ideological aspects ==
Classic Maya clothing displays its full variety in the context of religious performance. The deities themselves and their human impersonators were recognizable by their dress. A good example of this is the Tonsured Maize God, who wore a netted over-skirt consisting of green jade beads and a belt consisting of a large spondylus shell covering the loins, and who was repeatedly impersonated by the king as well as the queen.

Anthropologist, Linda Brown, through her research with the Tzʼutujil-Maya people, explains that process of weaving on the backstrap loom is a microcosm of their religious cosmology. Maya ontology has been called animaic, a belief that extends agency and personhood beyond just humans. Personhood is generated through the reciprocal relationship between things and identified through a heightened responsiveness to one's surroundings. Brown writes about the connection that weaving has to “The Old Grandmother” or the first midwife. This ancestral being is connected to Chac Chel, the Maya goddess of birth, divination, weaving, creation, among other things. Chac Chel is often described as the older, grandmother-like counterpart to the goddess Ixchel. Religious meaning was imbued into everyday practices. Replicating the structure of the universe was not limited to ceremony but extended into everyday life. Metaphor is known to be an integral part of how religious concepts have been depicted.

Brown explains that the process of creating cloth is integrated with references and metaphors of birthing. In Tz’utujil, the rope that connects the backstrap loom to the post is called the umbilical cord. The post is referred to as the Mother Tree, an embodiment of the original creator pair. As the backstrap loom connects the weaver to the Mother Tree through the umbilical cord rope, she develops the cloth, symbolically reenacting human gestation. Finally, both the baby and the finished cloth must be separated from its place of gestation, through cutting the umbilical cord and cutting the cloth from the loom.

Birth, being a focal point in Maya creation myths, was an important in ancient Maya views. Midwifery, under the domain of Ixchel, was considered to be a ritual specialist. The connection between birth and weaving is an example of Maya religious metaphor.

== Legislative protection ==
In 2011, Efrain Asij, President of Guatemala's Commission for Culture, proposed legislative changes in favor of protecting textiles produced by indigenous communities. He touted the textiles' economic value to the women of these Mayan communities, as well as the cultural heritage represented in these designs. Asij stated that traditional woven Mayan designs are in danger of losing their cultural significance and economic value because of piracy and counterfeit production of Mayan garments. He calls for the creation of schools designed to create the next generation of Guatemalan weavers, in order to ensure that this ancient and sacred art continues to be valued. He also proposes that a study be conducted that would track sales of Mayan garments, specifically to locate problems of exploitation of their designs and how these designs are sold. Asij also proposed that Mayan communities be allowed to import their manufacturing equipment tax-free. Mayan communities could also purchase advertising, and export their textiles from Guatemala tax-free as well. All Departments of Guatemala's government are expected to promote and participate in the protection of traditional Mayan textile production.

In 2016, legislative changes were presented to Guatemala's national government by the National Movement of Maya Weavers, a coalition of weavers from all over Guatemala. 30 Weaving Co-Operatives from 18 linguistic communities in Guatemala are supporting the movement which is led by the Women's Association for Development of Sacatepequez, known in its Spanish acronym as AFEDES. They argue that corporations have been exploiting their culture by mass-producing their designs which ultimately devalues and degrades their sacredness, and they are calling for revamped legislative protection that grants each Mayan community collective intellectual ownership of their traditional designs.

== Current day textiles ==
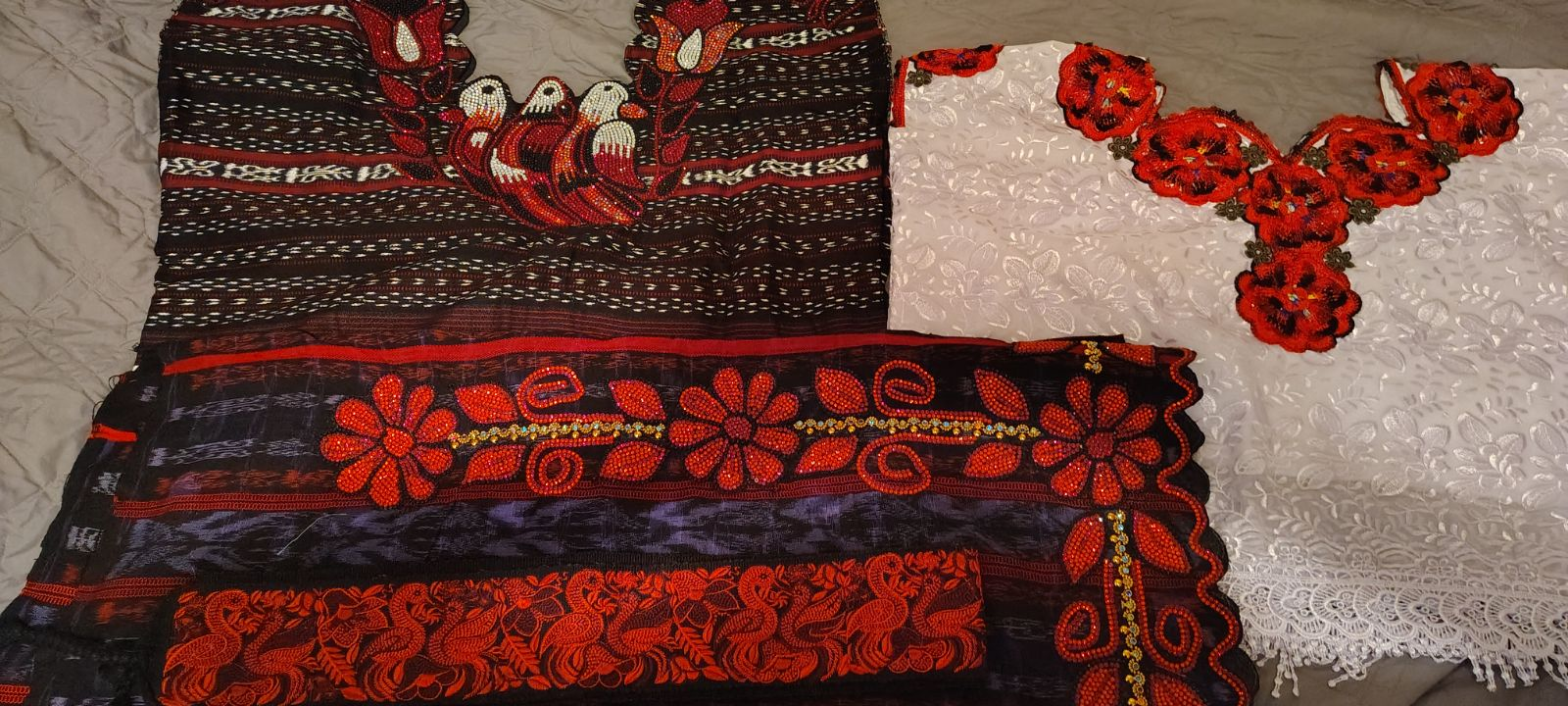
Two Huipils, One Corte, and a faja

In current day Mayan textiles, much has changed in the fields of design, technique, and materials. The Kaqchikel and Kʼicheʼ are two specific ethnic-linguistic groups that still have strong weaving traditions. According to Schevill, "field studies reveal that many of the design decisions which a weaver must make in producing a garment are spontaneous. Often the only conscious decision made prior to beginning the weaving process is the selection of the colors for the background fabric." Patterns would signify specific ethnic groups and social status but nowadays the patterns are less strict and more creativity filled. For other groups, "local tradition dictates at least the overall composition of garments. Although deviation from these aesthetic norms is not strictly forbidden, it does leave the weaver open to ridicule or gossip."

Apart from more freehand designs new materials are being introduced into the textiles. For example textiles now, "include the use of imported rickrack, ribbons, metallic threads, variegated embroidery floss, and velvet edgings on hand-loomed garments. All of these can be seen as inventive free-play on the part of the indigenous artist."

The Mayan women, weavers of textiles, are the ones who, for the most part, stick to tradition and wear the trajes. The Mayan men have declined in their usage of traditional mayan clothing mainly because they want to avoid ladino harassment while, "women... continue to wear indigenous styles of clothing to symbolize their work of bearing and enculturating the next generation and thus perpetuating Mayan culture."

Weavers today who continue this tradition, use a backstrap loom, a traditional and ancient technique. This is a wearable device, one side attached to the weaver and the other side attached to a solid object/structure.

== See also ==
- Textiles of Oaxaca
