= Bernice Notenboom =

Dutch journalist and film producer

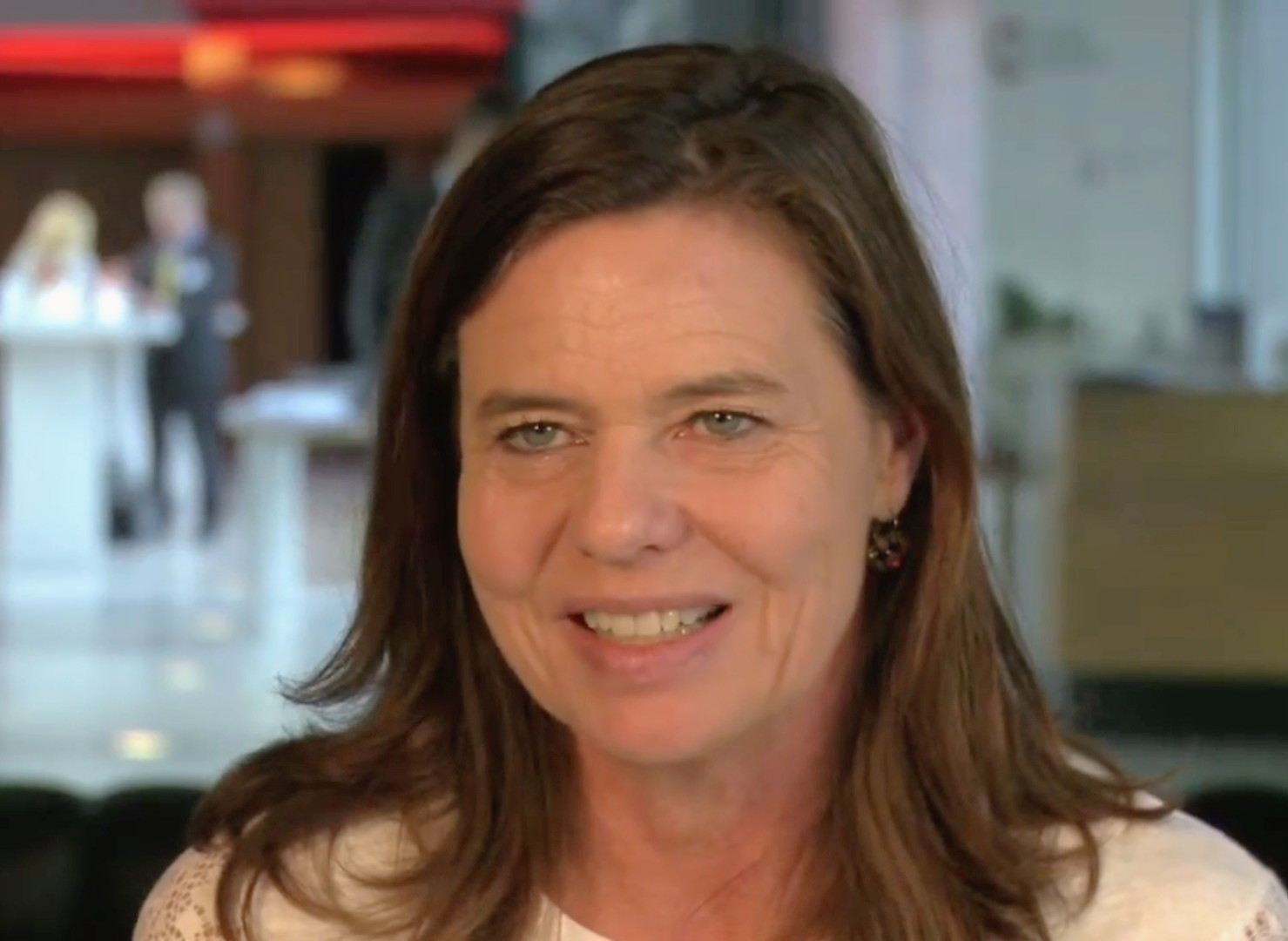
Notenboom in 2016

Bernice Notenboom (born 1 June 1962, in Rotterdam) is a Dutch journalist and film producer, described in several sources as a "professional adventuress" on account of her well publicised expeditions to some of the most environmentally stressed corners of our planet. She has come to wider prominence through her succession of Documentary films, warning against the perils of Global warming. She is a long-standing contributor to National Geographic. In January 2008 she hit the headlines in the Netherlands as the first Dutch woman to travel to the South Pole on skis, an enterprise which involved a ski-trek of several hundred kilometers (>500 miles). The next year she became only the second Dutch woman to climb to the top of Mount Everest.

== Life ==
Bernice Notenboom was born in Rotterdam. As a child she fell in love with the mountains during annual family holidays in the Swiss Alps from which, as she later confessed to an interviewer, she always returned to the flatness of her homeland "with ... a heavy heart". (Note: "Als de vakantie voorbij was, kwam ik altijd met lange tanden en een zwaar hart terug op Schiphol. Een gevoel dat pas verdween toen ik naar Canada verhuisde en in de bergen ging wonen.") In other respects she was, at least by her own reckoning, an inconspicuous and, for her school teachers, eminently forgettable little girl. (Note: "... Leraren van toen herinneren mij niet eens meer")

After leaving school she studied Geography at Delft before moving on to the (original) University of Amsterdam, emerging in 1988 with a master's degree in Communication studies. In 1988 she moved to North America, obtaining in 1990 a Master of Business Administration degree at the University of Denver (Colorado). Since that time she has made her home alternately in the Netherlands and in North America, most recently on the eastern approaches of the Canadian Rockies. Press releases make mention of her having "worked [apparently briefly] on Wall Street". In 1992 she joined Microsoft, accepting a position as a marketing manager, and remaining with the (at that time) Seattle-based corporation for approximately two years. Her responsibilities involved promoting Windows 95 internationally.

- The enormous problems caused by the warming of the earth are always on my mind. I read about them, write about them, make films on the subject. I know exactly how the North Pole was ten years ago, five years ago, three years ago. You see the changes. You try and make all the pieces of the puzzle, all the data, fit together. It overwhelms your senses. Then you're standing there and ... everything stops. Everything falls away. Silence. Emptiness. You breath in: the dialogue with the ice resumes."
- "Die enorme problemen door de opwarming van de aarde zitten steeds in mijn hoofd. Ik lees erover, schrijf erover, maak er films over. Ik weet precies hoe het tien jaar geleden op de Noordpool was, vijf jaar geleden, drie jaar geleden. Je ziet de veranderingen. Je probeert de puzzelstukjes, al die data, in elkaar te passen. Dat raast allemaal door je harses. En dan ben je daar en stopt het even. Alles valt van je af. Die stilte, die leegte. Je ademt, en gaat de dialoog met het ijs aan."
  Bernice Notenboom in conversation with Marcel aan de Brugh

She would later recall a moment of decision in 1994 which came to her during her fourth business trip from Seattle to Taiwan in a single month. Through the window of the aeroplane she saw Mount Rainier, which she had intended to climb for many years: but there had never been time. She resolved to abandon the corporate career ladder in favor of something more congenial. The next ten years were spent setting up and running "Moki Treks" her own "rafting company" in Utah, that aimed "to raise awareness of indigenous cultures" and employed "Native Americans as travel guides and cultural emissaries". Working in a seasonal business and being her own boss meant she was able to make plenty of time for "expeditions" to wild places, mostly involving mountains. By 2004, when she sold the business to pursue a life as a full-time "adventuress-writer", she had also become a regular contributor to National Geographic. During her time in Utah, Bernice Notenboom also acquired a husband: their union broke up in response to her energetic pursuit of her adventurous expeditions ("... spannende expedities"), however.

In 2010 Notenboom wrote her book "Tegenpolen" (Between Poles) (Note: "Tegenpolen" appeared, initially, under the title "A Heartwarming Journey On Ice".) which concerned expeditions to Siberia, Greenland, the North Pole and the South Pole. The previous year she had become only the second Dutch woman to climb to the top of Mount Everest. (The first, ten years earlier, was Katja Staartjes.) The Mount Everest expedition provided a basis for her film "Himalaya Alert", directed by Mark Verkerk, which draws attention to the so-called Asian brown cloud phenomenon, was transmitted by the Buddhist Broadcasting Foundation ("Boeddhistische Omroep Stichting" / BOS). The film won a prize at the Trento Film Festival. Another adventure-expedition around this time involved journeying by Kayak between Bamako and Timbuktu, along the Bani and Niger Rivers in Mali. She teamed up with the meteorologist-activist Margot Ribberink to produce the 2011 film "Desert Alert" in Mali. The film highlights some of the social consequences of climate change in developing countries.

In 2012/2013 she produced and presented the six part television series "Klimaatjagers" ("Climate Hunters") for the VPRO (Netherlands) and Canvas (Belgium) television companies. Notenboom presented and co-produced another six-point series, "Tipping Points", in 2013. The series addressed the issue of ecosystem collapses being triggered by temperature increases of just a few degrees: it was broadcast on mainstream television channels in a number of European countries and in North America.

In 2014 Notenboom started work on filming "The Arctic March" in the course of another Arctic expedition on skis, traveling from the North Pole to Canada. The film was intended as a co-production with the Canadian academic Sarah Robertson about the fate of the North Pole ice sheet. The intention was to cover a distance of 800 km, but the expedition had to be abandoned after 660 km because melting ice made its continuation too dangerous. Another Arctic Expedition is planned for 2020.

Her 52-minute television documentary film "Sea Blind" was produced – again in partnership with Sarah Robertson – in 2016. It was again broadcast internationally in various countries and has been screened in various cinemas round the world subsequently. Described as an "impact film", the production has been designed to influence public and business opinion, and thereby to influence political decisions. The film was shewn during the London meeting of the International Maritime Organization to influence the decision to reduce the sulphur percentages in shipping fuel. "Sea Blind" in some ways represented an international breakthrough. Special versions were produced in Chinese and German.

Bernice Notenboom's book "Arctica, mijn biografie van de Noordpool" ("Arctica: my biography of the North Pole") appeared in 2018.

== Recognition (not a complete list) ==
- In 2011 Bernice Notenboom was one of six writers short-listed for the Bob den Uyl travel literature prize for her book "Tegenpolen".
- In 2016 the mayor of Rotterdam, Ahmed Aboutaleb, nominated Bernice Notenboom as a Knight of the Order of Orange-Nassau.
- In 2016 Bernice Notenboom received the Wubbo Ockels prize from the "Springtij" sustainability forum.
