= Women in Maya society =

Ancient Maya women had an important role in society: beyond propagating the culture through bearing and raising children, Maya women participated in economic, governmental, and farming activities. The lives of women in ancient Mesoamerica are not well documented: "Of the three elite founding area tombs discovered to date within the Copan Acropolis, two contain the remains of women, and yet there is not a single reference to a woman in either known contemporary texts or later retrospective accounts of Early Classic events and personages at Copan," writes a scholar.

Women play a significant role in rituals, cooking food for consumption and sacrifice. Whether women participated in said rituals is unknown. Women also worked on all of the textiles, an essential resource, and product for Maya society.

The status of women in Maya society can be inferred from their burials and textual and monumental history. Maya societies include Toniná, a city that developed a matrilineal system of hereditary descent after the reign and death of the powerful leader, Lady Kʼawil. She had assumed the mantle of power after the failure of the two male leaders. Lady Kʼawil's reign is documented in murals that depict her seated on a throne with captives at her feet.

== Food ==
Maya cuisine has been well documented. Techniques implemented by pre-Columbian Mayan societies include large-scale agricultural production, hunting, and foraging. The milpa growing system provided the essential staples of the Mayan diet: corn, beans, and squash. They also have a small variety of rice called quinoa.

== Art ==
The leading role of the Moon goddess may be interpreted through her depiction in the codices and ancient murals. Another often depicted goddess is Ixchel. Textiles were a central aspect of ancient Mayan life, and while it is not known whether all women produced textiles, those that were produced were created by women. Women used different objects in the spinning and weaving processes depending on their social class. Noble women could use dye in textiles. Craft and fiber evidence from the city of Ceren, which was buried by volcanic ash in 600 C.E., indicates that by that time, women's textile work was considered art, not simply crafts woven for a specific household purpose. The creation of the works of art suggests there was a market for them. Women held power in their ability to work thread and to create something that represented value.

== Women's role in rituals ==
The social, and political rank of ancient Maya women is increasingly debated in archeological studies into the role of gender. To date, lines of evidence are based chiefly on an investigation of material culture (e.g. monumental sculpture and iconography, ceramic art), use of space (residential architecture and activity analysis, and, to a lesser extent, mortuary data). The principle of complementarity, i.e. that men and women played separate, but equally important, roles in society, is found in many studies that define an ideological basis for various expressions of female power, including male/female pairings and gender combination. For example, in the iconography of the Classic period public monuments which represent elites it could be argued that although women are seen as parts of male history in the texts of monuments depicting the lives of rulers, the images on the same monuments do not dwell on sexual characteristics. Males and females are identifiable only by their clothing and decoration, which shows a 'unified elite identity', in which male/female pairs are dichotomous. Grave goods, inscriptions, and texts also provide evidence of complementarity via the authority elite women gave to ruling lineages often through marriage alliances outside their natal homelands.

Food in the culture also serves as a determinant of status and as a metaphor. The processes of producing, distributing, and consuming food, as in all cultures, reflect their prevailing norms. In this instance, it can be inferred as a source of power for ancient Mayan women. Although it is believed that elite women controlled food used in rituals, analysis of diet from a variety of sites at different periods indicates that women ate less valued food than their male counterparts. By contrast, non-elite women appear to have shared the same food with men. This finding may suggest that: women did not participate in ritual consumption of food in the same way or to the same extent that men did; or that food consumption was associated with gender identity. Preferential access to ritual food by males ceases after the Spanish conquest but males continued to have more carnivorous diets. This phenomenon could be caused by the conversion of public rituals to private or the assimilation of Spanish gender values, or the underlying ideology that is maintained in gender dietary differences. Virtually all rituals involved feasting and women were in charge of the preparation of food and drink used as offerings and for consumption, as well as providing offerings of cloth (see below). Feasts and rituals were visible and significant means used by competing Maya elites to demonstrate their status. Whether or not women were active participants does not belie the social, symbolic, and political meaning of their contribution

In addition to the ideological basis for high female status, women exercised agency through their labor during the historic period. The labor of women was very important, both socially and economically but their participation in public rituals was limited; because of the potential ethnocentric and geographic bias. There may have been temporal and/or regional differences in the degree of female participation in ritual.

== Gender roles ==
Men and women performed differing tasks: "Males produce[d] food by agricultural labor, and helped women make babies but females process[ed] the products of the field to make them edible." In addition to raising deer when necessary, women had religious responsibilities related to household rituals. Women held important daily roles in this aspect of life. While young boys were being taught hunting skills, "the girl was trained in the household, and she was taught how to keep the domestic religious shrines."

Women were associated with the ritual practice of religion, as well as the beliefs themselves. The Moon Goddess is one of the most prominent gods in the Maya pantheon. Through her relations with the other gods, she produced the Maya population. The local rulers claimed descent from the Moon Goddess.

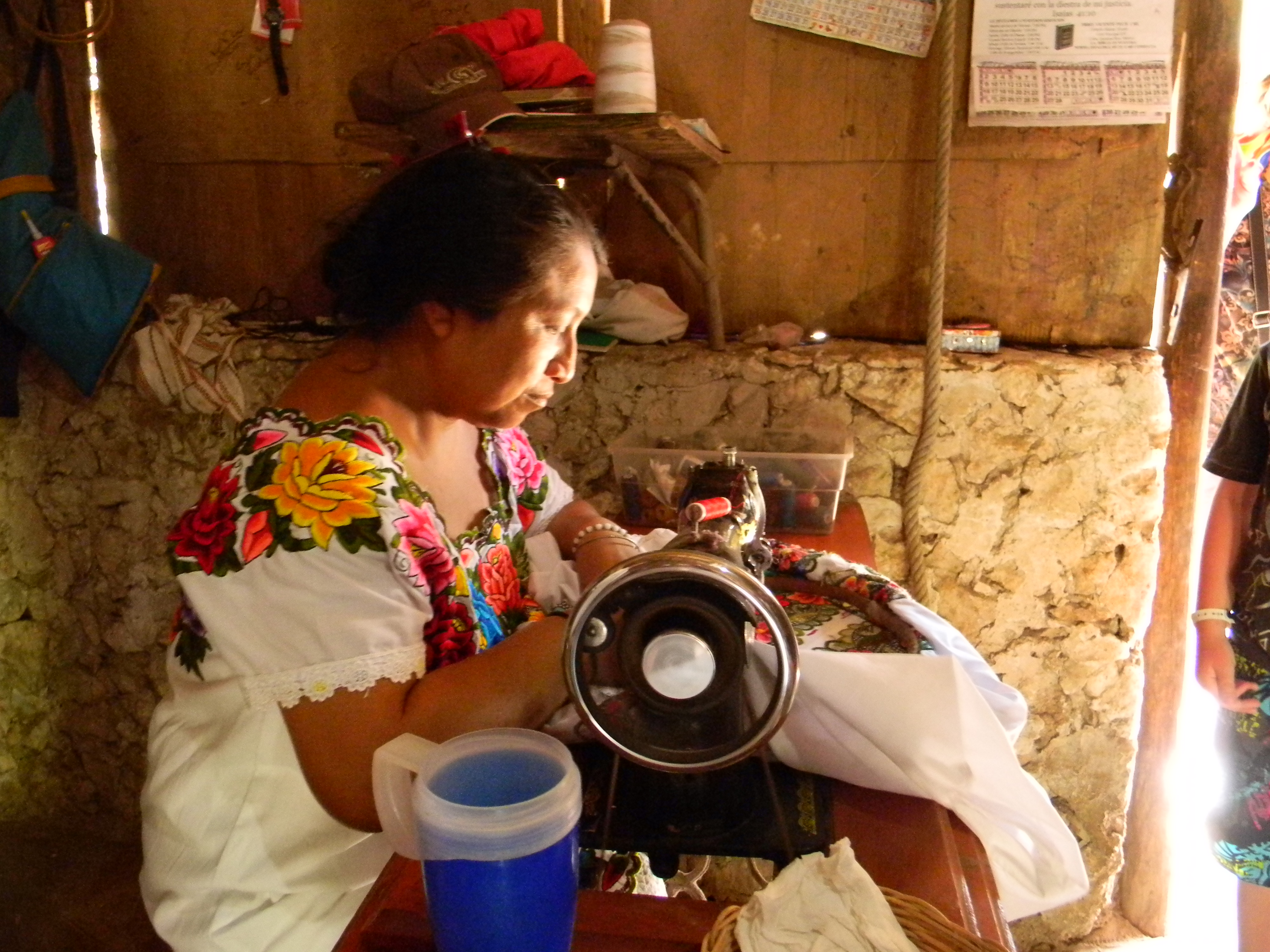
A Maya souvenir maker

Gender in ancient Maya art is ambiguous.. In some images of their heir recognition, this duality is explicit: there is a male figure on one side of the newly anointed, and a female figure on the other side.

== Textiles ==
The prevalence of women in rituals reflects the importance of women to the Maya social structure during the Classic period (AD 250– AD 900). Women were the primary weavers of textiles, which formed a major part of any ancient Mesoamerican economy. Based on ethnohistory and iconography, the Maya were huge producers of material for both internal and external use. However, the archaeological classification of textile production is complicated in any tropical region because of issues of conservation.

=== Evidence for textile production at Caracol, Belize ===
The evidence for the production and distribution of cloth that is found in the pre-Columbian Maya area and a large contributing site of archaeological data relative to textiles from the ancient Maya is in the city of Caracol, Belize. Archaeology at Caracol has been carried out annually from 1985 to the present and has resulted in the collection of data that permits insight into the economic production and social distribution of cloth at the site. This is accomplished by examining the contexts and distributions of spindle whorls, bone needles, bone pins and hairpins, bone awls, and limestone bars. All of these artifacts can be related to weaving, netting, or cloth in some way.

Spindle whorls are the artifacts most clearly associated with textile production. At least 57 have been recovered at Caracol, 38 of them in 20 different burials. Several of these interments are of high-status women placed in the most important architectural constructions at the site. The contextual placement of these burials stresses not only the link between women and weaving but also the high status associated with such activity, thus signaling the importance of cloth and spinning in ancient Maya society.

== Child bearing ==
Bearing and rearing children was an integral part of society. The mythology and power associated with the ability to create life was one which men tried to emulate. Men participated in bloodletting their genitals to create something new from their blood. Instead of giving birth to live, they would give birth to new eras through the symbolic gesture of menstruation. This act was highly ritualized; the objects used to pierce the skin were "stingray spines, obsidian blades, or other sharp instruments." The blood was allowed to drip on cloth, which was burned as part of the ritual.

A medical study found that Mexican Mayan women have the lowest symptoms of menopause reported along with Greek peasant women.

A medical study found that Mayan girls entered into menarche at around 15.1 years old.

== Intermarriage ==
In East Central Quintana Roo some of the Mayans are descended from the intermarriage between Mayan women and Chinese migrants. These descendents are discriminated against by some native people, although they are accepted in general. Mestizos and Mayans married Chinese without restraint.

Chinese men arrived in British Honduras (now Belize) as indentured workers, but many escaped upon arrival, running away to Santa Cruz. They married Mayan women and had children.

African, East Indian, European, and Chinese men all intermarried with native Maya Indian women in British Honduras.

== See also ==
- Women rulers in Maya society
- Goddess I
