= Nottebohm =

Nottebohm is a German surname meaning "nut tree". Notable people with the surname include:

- Andreas Nottebohm (born 1944), American-German artist
- Gustav Nottebohm (1817–1882), German classical pianist, teacher and musical editor
- Fernando Nottebohm (born 1940), Argentine neuroscientist

== See also ==
- Nottebohm case
