= Old royal family of Copán =

Old royal family of Copán úuchben baatsil xíimbal tumen u copán Antigua dinastía de Copán
- Country: Kingdom of Oxwitik
- Current region: Honduras
- Founded: Unknown (Possibly late precalsic period)
- Founder: First king of Copan
- Members: Foliate Ajaw
- Distinctions: Ahau/Ajaw (My lord); k'ul ajaw (Heavenly lord); King of Copan
- Dissolution: 426 a.C

The Old royal family of Copán was the dynasty that ruled the city-state of Copan before the foundation of the Yax Kuk Mo dynasty in 426 AD. The ancient royal family of Copan has been under an aura of mystery due to the scant information we have about it, meaning that its existence is known thanks to archeological remains.

== History ==
Although the first stone architectural structures built in Copán date from the 9th century B.C., the fertile valley of the Copán River was already an agricultural region long before. The city was already important before it was refounded by a foreign elite. Although some references to Copán's predynastic history were found in later texts, none of them date from before the city was refounded in AD 426. c.

=== Fall ===
In 426 the nobleman Knich Yax Kuk Mo undertook a conquest against Copan with the support of Tikal and the approval of Teotihuacan. After his successful military campaign, the city was conquered and he proclaimed himself king. Some Historians claim that King Knich decided to marry one of the daughters of the previous king of Copán before his enthronement to legitimise his accession to the throne and unite both houses. With Knich on the throne of Copán, this city would now be connected by blood with the nobility of Tikal and Teotihuacan.

== See also ==
- History of Honduras
- Mayans
