= Narco-state =

Political and economic term

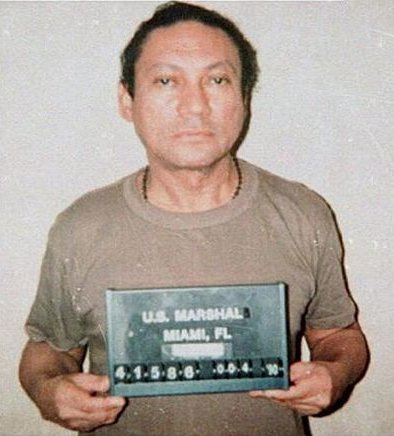
Panamanian leader Manuel Noriega, following his arrest by U.S. authorities

Narco-state, also called narco-capitalism or narco-economy, (Note: The terms are standard words with the prefix "narco-", defined by the Oxford English Dictionary as "associated with the trade in illegal drugs".) is a political and economic term applied to countries where all legitimate institutions become penetrated by the power and wealth of the illegal drug trade. The term was first used to describe Bolivia following the 1980 coup of Luis García Meza which was seen to be primarily financed with the help of narcotics traffickers.

The term is often seen by critics as ambiguous because of the differentiation between narco-states. The overall description would consist of illegal organisations that either produce, ship or sell drugs and hold a grip on the legitimate institutions through force, bribery or blackmail. This situation can arise in different forms. For instance, Colombia, where drug lord Pablo Escobar ran the Medellín Cartel (named after his birthplace) during most of the 1970s and 1980s, producing and trafficking cocaine to the United States of America. Escobar managed to take over control of most of the police forces in Medellín and surrounding areas through bribery and coercion, allowing him to expand his drug trafficking business.

Currently, scholars argue that the term "narco-state" is oversimplified because of the underlying networks running the drug trafficking organisations. For example, the Guadalajara Cartel in Mexico, led by Miguel Ángel Félix Gallardo, who managed to combine several small drug trafficking families into one overarching cartel, controlling the marijuana production in the rural areas of Mexico, while trafficking Colombian cocaine to the US at the same time.

Over time, the cocaine market expanded to Europe, leading to new routes being discovered from Colombia through Brazil or Venezuela and Western Africa. These new routes proved to be more profitable and successful than shipping from North America and turned African states such as Nigeria, Ghana, and later on Guinea-Bissau into actual narco-states. While cocaine was transported through Western Africa, the Taliban produced opium in the rural areas of Afghanistan using the revenues to fund their guerrilla war. Despite American and NATO efforts to impose laws on the Afghan opium production, the early 2000s incumbent Afghan governments shielded the opium trade from foreign policies as much as possible. As of 2024, Syria's Assad regime was regarded as the world's largest narco-state, with an estimated global Captagon export worth $30–57 billion annually. Revenue from the illicit drug exports accounted for around 90% of the revenue of the Assad regime. Since its fall, drug manufacturing has been reduced, but significant transit of drugs still exists through Syria.

Ongoing discussions divide scholars into separate groups either claiming or disclaiming the resemblance between narco-states and failed states. Depending on which properties are assigned to the definition of a failed state, the definition is in accordance with the narco-state. While most narco-states show signs of high rates of corruption, violence and murder, properties that are also assigned to failed states, it is not always clear if violence can be traced back to drug trafficking.

== Usage ==
It has been argued that narco-states can be divided into five categories depending on their level of dependence on the narcotics trade and the threat the narcotics trade in said country poses to domestic and international stability. These five categories are (in ascending order): incipient, developing, serious, critical, and advanced; however, use of the term narco-state has been questioned by some for being too widely and uncritically applied, particularly following the widespread media attention given to Guinea-Bissau as "the world's first narco-state" in 2008, and should instead refer only to those countries in which the narcotics trade is state-sponsored and constitutes the majority of a country's overall GDP.

== Examples ==
=== Afghanistan ===
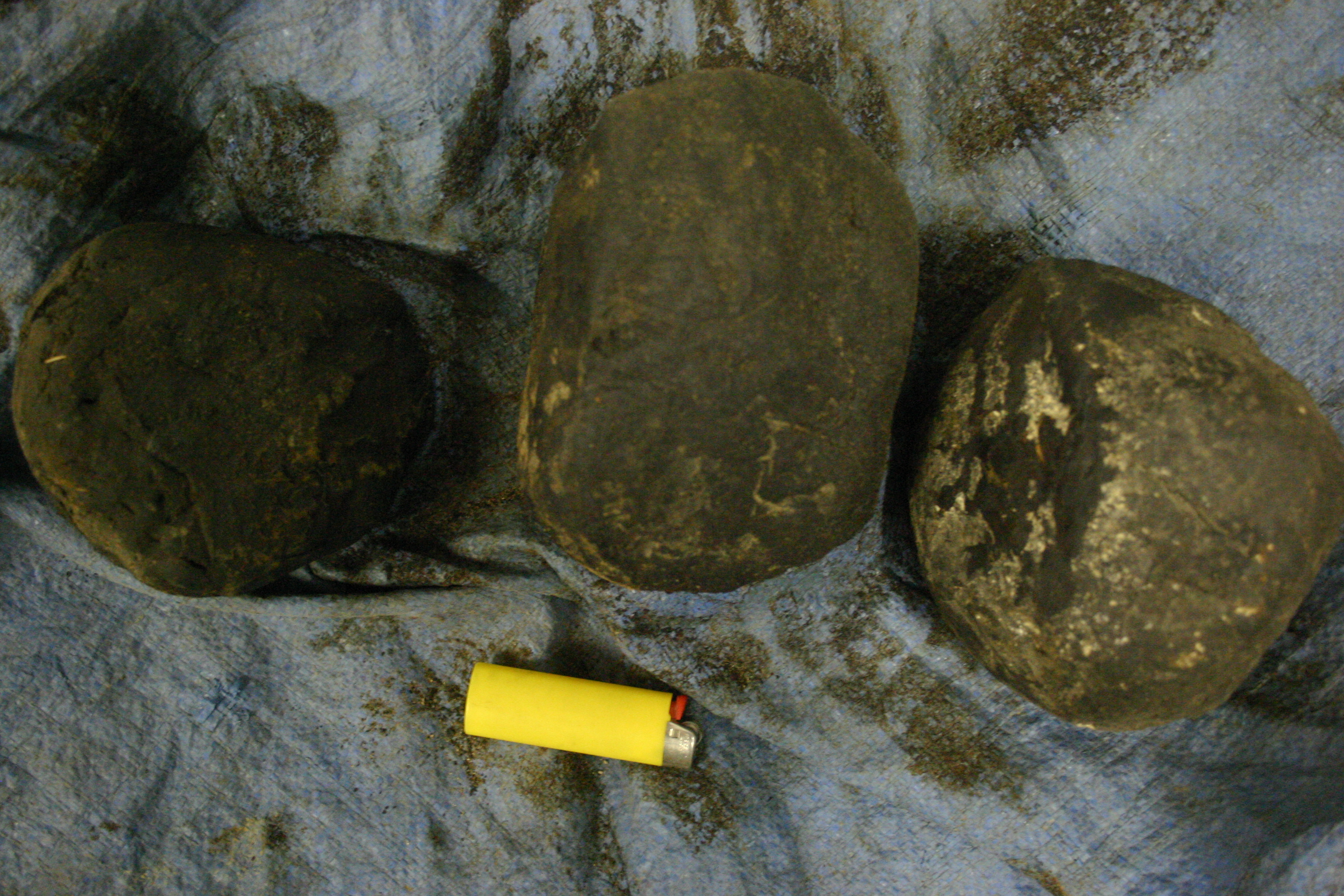
Seized opium from Afghanistan, 2005

Afghanistan was very well known for its opium production. As of 2021, Afghanistan's harvest produces more than 90% of illicit heroin globally, and more than 95% of the European supply. Most of the opium was smuggled through Herat and Faizabad to the Golden Crescent countries such as Iran and Pakistan. Opium production and trafficking are known to have funded the Taliban's military activities and insurgency.

=== Belize ===
Belize has been described as a narco-state in Mexican media owing to close links between Belizean authorities and Mexican drug cartels. The country was a base of operations for Joaquín "El Chapo" Guzmán and Ismael Zambada García with his Sinaloa Cartel, along with Mexico and Honduras. Johnny Briceño, elected prime minister of Belize in 2020, is the son of Elijio "Don Joe" Briceño, who in 1985 was convicted of trafficking marijuana and cocaine into the United States. Two others members of the Briceño family were also indicted, with prosecutors describing the clan as operating a "family marijuana business".

=== Bolivia ===
The drug trade in Bolivia gained its prominence in 1980s, when the demand for cocaine was booming across Latin America. Bolivia's most lucrative crop and economic activity in the 1980s was coca, whose leaves were processed clandestinely into cocaine. The country was the second largest grower of coca in the world, supplying approximately fifteen percent of the US cocaine market in the late 1980s. Analysts believed that exports of coca paste and cocaine generated between US$600 million and US$1 billion annually in the 1980s (depending on prices and output).

In 1980, General Luis García Meza overthrew President Lidia Gueiler in a bloody coup d'état allegedly aided by drug cartels. The dictatorship of García Meza was very well known for its state sponsored drug trafficking activities. García Meza's regime oversaw Bolivia's 13-month period of isolation. The Reagan administration distanced themselves from García Meza's regime and halted some aid to Bolivia due to the regime's relationship with drug cartels. García Meza's time in office was short-lived as he was overthrown and replaced by General Celso Torrelio. García Meza was convicted in absentia for his human rights violations in Bolivia, and he was later extradited from Brazil in 1995 and sentenced to serve 30 years in a Bolivian prison. His collaborator, Colonel Luis Arce Gómez, was extradited to the United States to serve his sentence for drug trafficking in a United States federal prison. The 1980s coup was said to have been financed by Bolivia's most notorious drug baron, Roberto Suárez Gómez. Suárez Gómez was the founder of La Corporación, a Bolivian drug cartel tied to Pablo Escobar's Medellín Cartel. The organization was founded in the 1970s and mainly focused in Santa Cruz de la Sierra; it amassed $400 million annually. The cocaine shipped from the Bolivian Amazon to Colombia was valued at $9,000 per kilogram. In 1988, Suárez Gómez was arrested by the Bolivian National Police and sentenced to 15 years in prison; his nephew Jorge Roca Suárez continued his business until his arrest in 1990.

=== Brazil ===
Since 1990, the phenomenon of urban violence has intensified. There are currently more than fifty criminal factions in Brazil. Since the 1990s, Brazil has seen a significant increase in urban violence, often linked to drug trafficking and organized crime. The presence of over fifty criminal factions indicates a deeply entrenched network of illicit activities. These groups are involved in various illegal operations, including the local drug trade and international drug trafficking. The power and influence of these factions, such as the First Capital Command (PCC) and the Red Command (CV), extend beyond prisons into various urban areas, contributing to the issue. Brazil's extensive borders with major cocaine-producing countries like Colombia, Peru, and Bolivia make it a key transit country for drug trafficking. This geographic situation, combined with socio-economic factors and challenges in law enforcement and judicial systems, creates an environment conducive to the growth of organized crime and drug trafficking.

Former president Jair Bolsonaro's family has been linked to so called "milícias", composed of police officers and other government officials engaged in narcotrafic. One of aides, who has been charged a 2 million euro fine over cocaine transportation, is being investigated for using an official airplane and the president's credit card for drug-trafficking. During the presidential election of 2022, Bolsonaro supporters made claims regarding Lula's alleged links to criminal factions. Other politicians, such as former president Fernando Collor de Mello, have been investigated for mobster relations.

=== Colombia ===
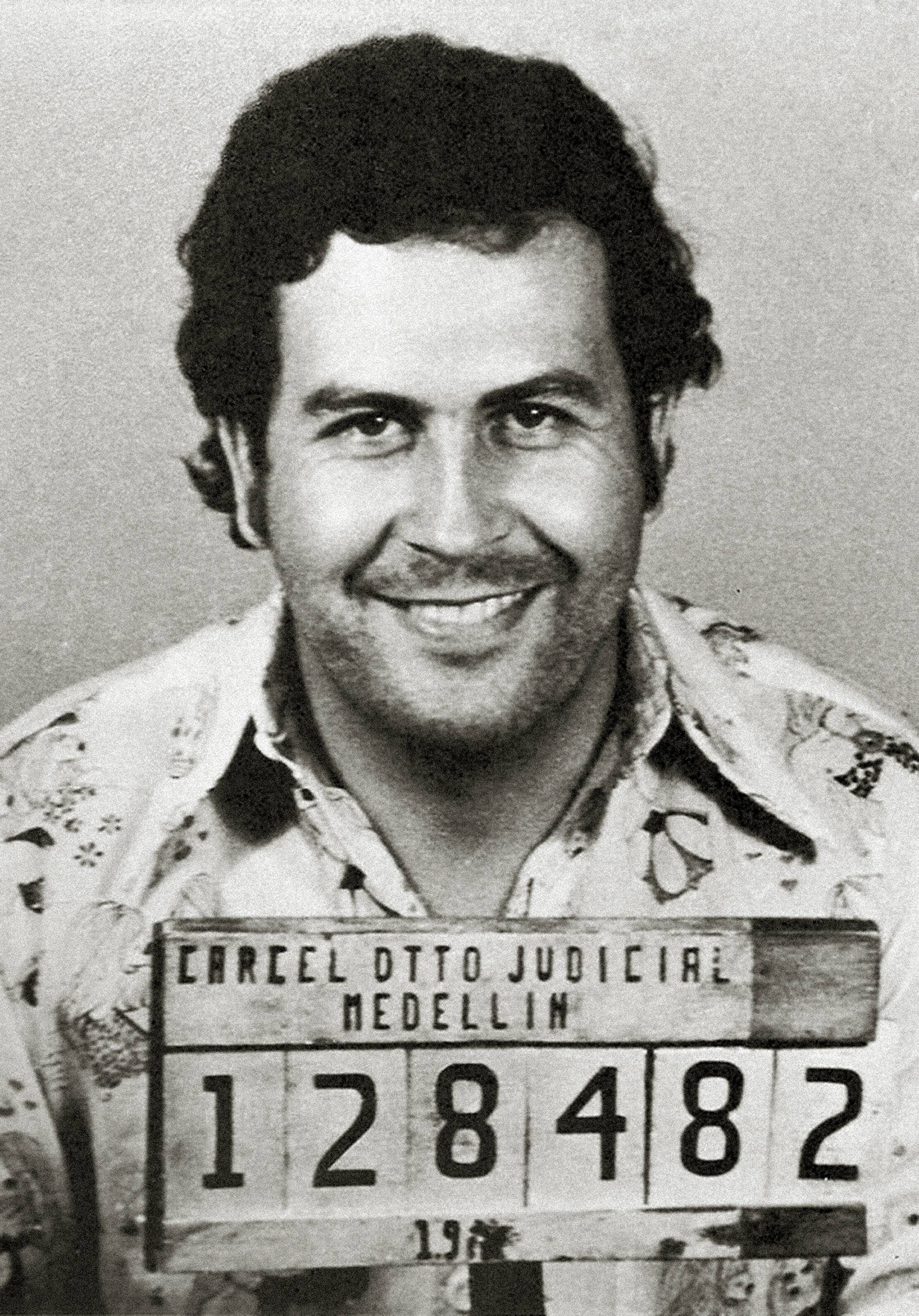
1976 mugshot of Pablo Escobar

Beginning in the mid-1970s, Colombian drug cartels became major producers, processors and exporters of illegal drugs, primarily marijuana and cocaine. The drug trade in Colombia was monopolized by four drug trafficking cartels: Medellín, Cali, Norte del Valle, and North Coast. However some guerilla warlords in the Colombian conflict were also said to be involved in drug trafficking in the country.

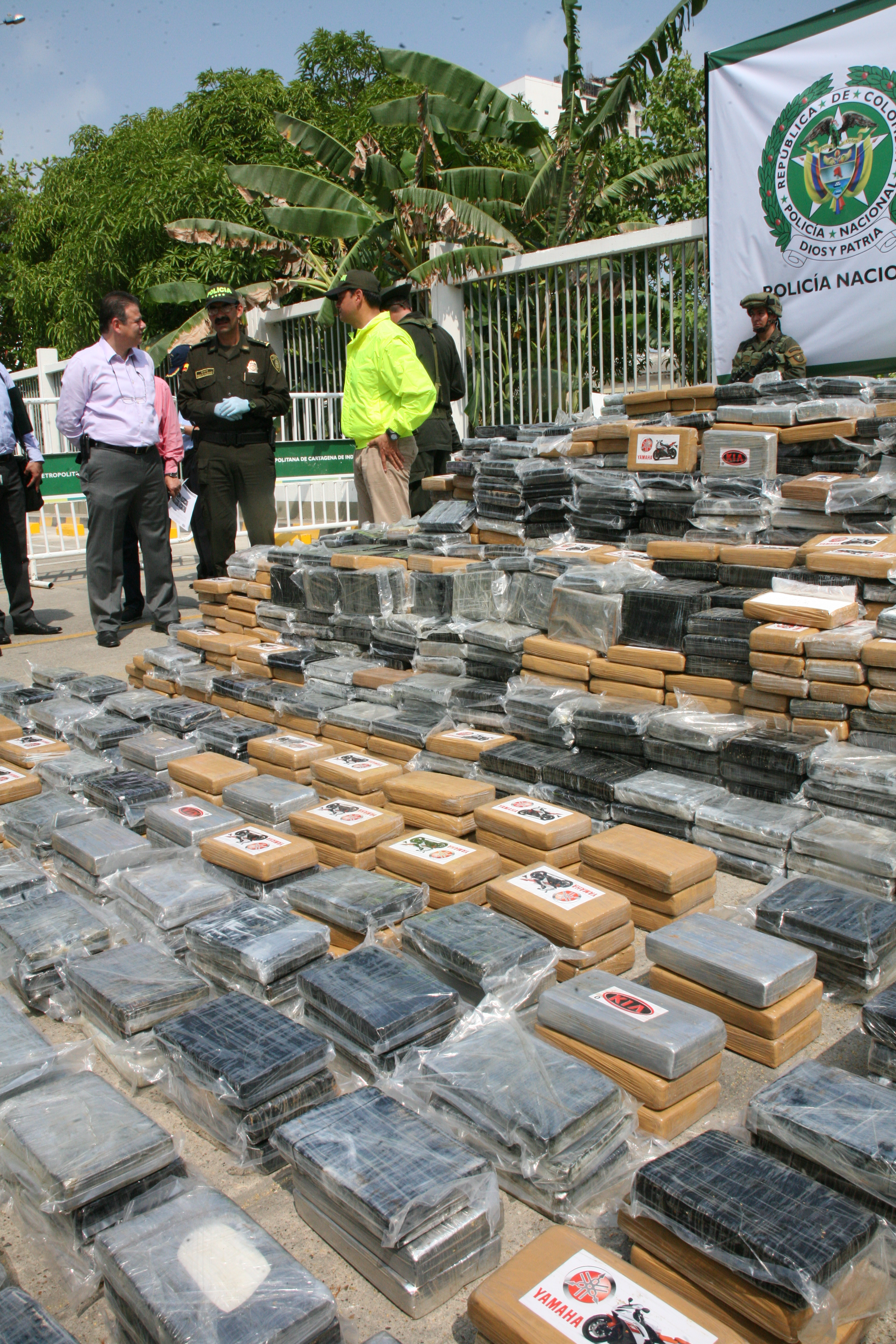
Cocaine seized by Colombian Police

The Medellín Cartel was once the largest drug cartel operating in Colombia, led by Pablo Escobar which focused its operations in the city of Medellín. Most of the imported drugs are originated from countries like Bolivia and Peru which were later processed in Colombia. The Medellín Cartel gained prominence in the 1980s when the cartel amassed $60 million worth of fortune from drug trade to the United States, mainly focused on Florida, New York, and California. This caused the United States government to sign an extradition treaty with Colombia. Escobar's business empire was known for its "reign of terror" as the cartel staged numerous kidnappings, assassinations and bombings around Colombia to ensure its business continuity. Pablo Escobar was shot to death by police in 1993; after the death of Pablo Escobar, the Medellín Cartel began to decline which eventually led to its disbandment. The disbandment of the Medellín Cartel has led to the other three major cartels, especially the Cali Cartel, to seize the opportunity to expand their trade routes.

During the drug war, major Colombian cartels were known to be influencing Colombian politicians and warlords alike. In order to flex his muscle, Escobar went to politics and ran as candidate for the Chamber of Representatives under the banner of the Liberal Alternative; however, Escobar's ambition in politics was later thwarted after knowledge of his criminal activity was exposed to the representatives, which forced him to resign. This event become the root cause of the assassination of justice minister Rodrigo Lara Bonilla. In contrast to the Medellín Cartel, the Cali Cartel adopted a more subtle approach on influencing local politicians. In 1994, the outgoing president Ernesto Samper was involved in the Proceso 8000 scandal in which he was accused of being funded by drug money, allegedly from the Cali Cartel for his campaign in the 1994 Colombian presidential election. The scandal caused then US president Bill Clinton to cut Colombian aid and later revoke Samper's visa.

In 2023, Nicolas Petro, son of Colombian President Gustavo Petro was arrested for a money laundering case. Petro was accused of taking money from drug traffickers to fund his peace effort and presidential campaign which he would later deny. Nicolas Petro later told Semana that he and his father were not aware about the money he received was coming from drug traffickers.

=== Guatemala ===
Guatemala is an important transit country for drug trafficing from south america (Venzuela, Columbia and Ecuador) to Mexico and the US. Because of that fact and serving as critical land and maritime bridge between South American drug producers and Mexican cartels, such as the Sinaloa Cartel and CJNG, criminal organizations actively infiltrate the state to secure trafficking routes. Guatemalan politics and drug cartels are deeply intertwined through campaign financing, local territorial control, and institutional protection.

In November 2026, the United States added both the Lorenzana clan and the Mendoza cartel, which operates in the neighboring region of Izabal to its list of foreign terrorist organizations.

=== Guinea-Bissau ===
Guinea-Bissau, in West Africa, has been called a narco-state due to government officials often being bribed by traffickers to ignore the illegal trade. Colombian drug cartels used the West African coast as Jamaica and Panama increased policing. The Guardian noted that Guinea-Bissau's lack of prisons, poor policing, and poverty attracted the traffickers. An article in Foreign Policy questioned the effectiveness of money from the United States, the European Union, and the United Nations designated to combat the illegal trade.

=== Honduras ===
Honduras has been labeled as a narco-state due to drug trafficking involvement of President Juan Orlando Hernández and his brother Tony Hernández, who was a congressman. Tony Hernández was captured in 2018 in the United States and was accused of conspiracy of cocaine trafficking to the US in 2019. Also Fabio Lobo, the son of former president Porfirio Lobo, was arrested by DEA agents in Haiti in 2015. All of them are members of the National Party of Honduras.

=== Iran ===
Since 2017, a sudden surge in crystal meth production and smuggling from Iran has contributed to a drug epidemic in neighboring Iraq and Turkey. The value of drugs transiting through Iran is estimated at $19-20 billion in the destination market. (Approximately 5 percent of Iran’s GDP). Various sources have pointed to the role of the Revolutionary Guard in drug transit. The Times newspaper wrote in a detailed report in November 2017 that the Revolutionary Guard benefits billions of dollars annually from drug trafficking. The report states that this organization has established contacts with criminal networks in different parts of the world for drug trafficking. For this reason, some analysts consider Iran to be the largest narco-state in the world.

=== Lebanon ===
Illegal drugs trading pervaded in Lebanon since the 1960s. In 2014, Lebanese authorities seized 25.4 million Captagon tablets at the airport and Port of Beirut. In April 2015, the European Council stated that Lebanon had become a transit country for drug trafficking. In April 2021, Greek authorities seized four tonnes of cannabis hidden in dessert-making machinery at Piraeus, which was en route from Lebanon to Slovakia. In the same month, 5.3 million Captagon pills hidden in fruits imported from Lebanon were seized by authorities in Saudi Arabia. In May 2021, Lebanese authorities confiscated cocaine hidden in Makdous, destined for Australia. In the same month, Lebanese customs at Beirut Airport seized 60 tonnes of hashish, intended to be exported to the Netherlands.

=== Mexico ===
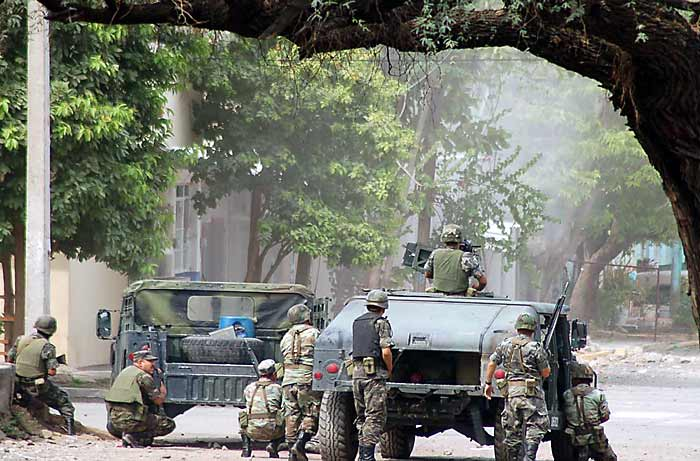
Mexican soldiers during a confrontation in Michoacán in August 2007

Government corruption has been a long-standing problem in Mexico. Drug cartels have been influential in Mexican politics, contributing large sums of money into Mexican electoral campaigns, supporting candidates sensitive to bribery in order to keep their businesses safe. Since the early 20th century, drug trafficking had been tolerated by the Mexican government. Since 1929, the dominant party of Mexico, the Institutional Revolutionary Party (PRI), forged ties with various groups in order to gain political influence. Among them were drug traffickers. The ties between the PRI and the drug lords sustained an alliance with the drug traffickers and sanctioned their activities.

During the 1980s and 1990s, the drug trade in Mexico accelerated. Before the 1980s most of Mexico produced marijuana and a small amount of heroin. Cocaine mostly reached the US through the Bahamas and the Caribbean. After the US shut down the routes that entered the state of Florida, Colombian drug cartels established a partnership with Mexican traffickers, finding new routes by which to smuggle cocaine over land into North America. A few small Mexican cartels merged into the Guadalajara cartel, led by Miguel Ángel Félix Gallardo. The Guadalajara cartel trafficked the cocaine produced by the Colombian Calí cartel, while expanding marijuana production in rural areas of Mexico.

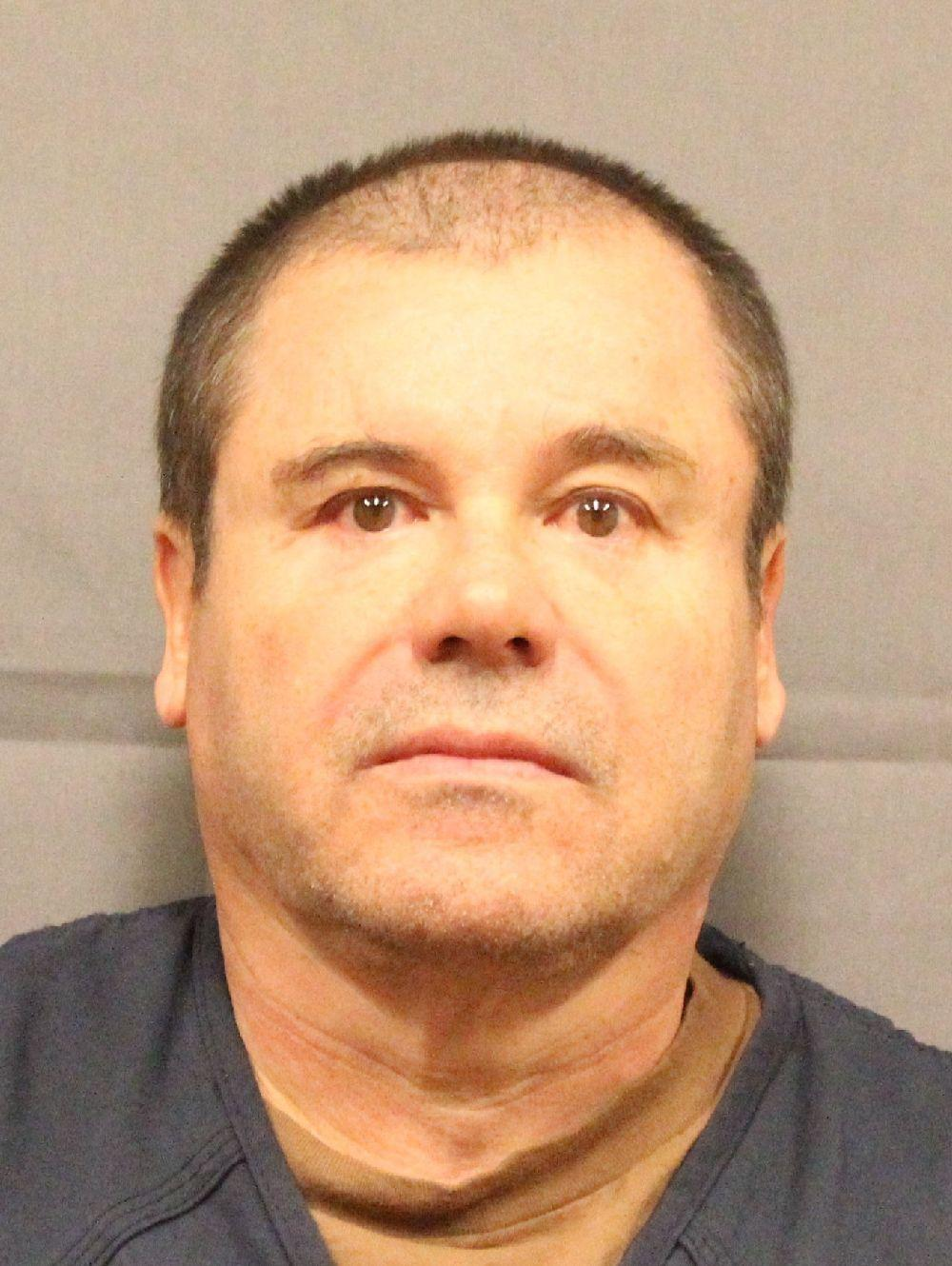
Joaquín "El Chapo" Guzmán

The US established a special force, named the Drug Enforcement Administration (DEA), to fight a war on drugs within their own borders and beyond. The DEA office in Mexico received extra resources to investigate the murder of one of their own agents, Enrique "Kiki" Camarena, who was abducted, tortured and murdered by a state police officer paid by members of the cartel. Their investigation confirmed the corruption that gripped Mexico in the 1980s and 1990s; however, not only police officers on the payroll obeyed Miguel Ángel Félix Gallardo and his cartel. Investigations show transactions to high officers in the federal government, such as the Federal Directorate of Security and the Mexican Federal Judicial Police.

The Mexican drug war in 2006, initiated by Mexico's newly elected president, Felipe Calderón, began a government armed effort to fight the drug cartels in Mexico. Calderón's predecessor, Vicente Fox, elected in 2000, had been the first Mexican president from outside the PRI. Despite Calderón's efforts, the PRI was returned to power in 2012 with the election of Enrique Peña Nieto. During the court hearing for the most wanted cartel leader, Joaquín "El Chapo" Guzmán, it was alleged that former president Enrique Peña Nieto had accepted a $100 million bribe from the drug kingpin.

=== Myanmar ===
Myanmar is the second-largest opium producing nation in the world, only behind Afghanistan. The opium trade network in Myanmar indirectly created a network widely known as the Golden Triangle, a term coined by the CIA, in the area around the Myanmar, Laos, and Thailand border. Opium production in Myanmar dates back to during the period of the Konbaung dynasty. In aftermath of the Chinese Civil War, some Kuomintang loyalists became involved in the opium trade in Burma. Most of the opium produced by the former Kuomintang soldiers was shipped south to Thailand. One of the most notorious figures in Myanmar drug business was Khun Sa, who was also trained by Burmese Army and the Kuomintang. Khun Sa's operations were said to have dominated the drug trade network in the Golden Triangle area, earning him the title "Opium King". Khun Sa's influence began to decline in 1990's, and he surrendered himself to the authorities in 1996.

=== North Korea ===
The international isolation imposed on North Korea has made the North Korean regime rely on illicit activities such as the drug trade to support its economy. The North Korean regime was known to have operated drug trading activities varying from opium to methamphetamine. The regime's drug trade network dates back to the 1970s, when then leader Kim Il Sung sanctioned the creation of opium farms in the country. The methamphetamine trade dates back to around the 1990s, with the regime known to have trafficked drugs to China's Jilin Province, later being sent to countries such as the Philippines, the United States, Hong Kong, Thailand, western Africa and others. In 2001, income from illegal drugs amounted to between $500 million and $1 billion. In 2003, the North Korean owned cargo ship Pong Su was intercepted importing heroin into Australia. The ship was suspected of being involved in smuggling almost 125 kilograms (276 lb) of the drug into Australia, with an estimated street value of A$160 million.

=== Netherlands ===
As early as 1996, the Netherlands was labelled as a narco-state in a French government report. Since then, the question of whether the Netherlands is actually a narco-state has been asked many times, and the answer depends strongly on which characteristics are attributed to a narco-state. In any case, the size of the drug sector in the Netherlands suggests that drug crime has been a persistent problem in the Netherlands for years, and that the fight against it constantly poses complex questions to politics and criminal justice. In 2018, several police detectives stated in a report by the Dutch Police Association that the Netherlands "already exhibited a painful number of characteristics of a narco-state". Minister Grapperhaus of Justice and Security stated in a response that the Netherlands is not a narco-state. After the murder of lawyer Derk Wiersum and crime reporter Peter R. de Vries, the qualification of the Netherlands as a narco-state received new attention.

=== Nicaragua ===
After the Nicaraguan Revolution, the Sandinista National Liberation Front, led by Daniel Ortega, took the national government of Nicaragua from the Somoza dynasty. In 1980s, the Sandinista government was accused of helping Pablo Escobar's Medellín Cartel by giving him access to a drug trafficking corridor within Nicaragua. According to the United States diplomatic cables leak, Ortega was said to receive drug money in order to influence the 2008 local elections in the country. Another cable also stated that Nicaraguan officials returned from Venezuela with a briefcase full of cash, indicating potential government involvement with drug cartels.

=== Panama ===
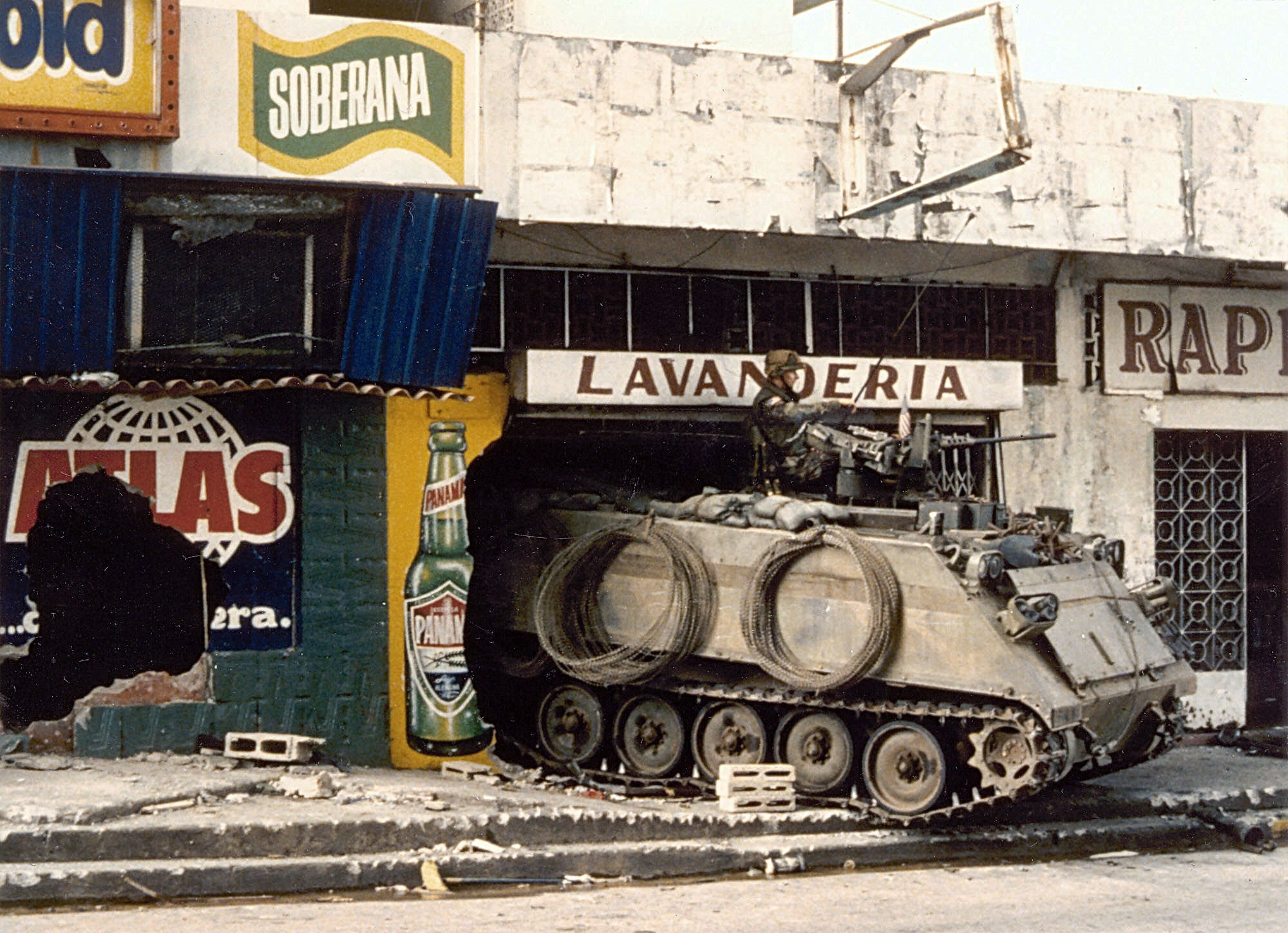
Operation Just Cause in 1989

The dictatorship of Manuel Noriega operated a state sponsored drug trade network which gave Panama a reputation of being a narco-state at the time. Noriega was well known to be involved in illegal drugs and arms trade which was dubbed as his "cash cow". Between 1981 and 1987, the Noriega regime had a cordial relationship with the United States due to a mutual interest where the Noriega administration helped arming the Contras in Nicaragua, in exchange for which the US ignored Noriega's illegal activities. Noriega's involvement in drug trafficking grew rapidly in the 1980s, reaching its peak in 1984. The conflict in Colombia and Central American countries gave Noriega the opportunity to transport cocaine to United States. Noriega's regime also formed an alliance with the Medellín Cartel.

In 1984, Noriega began to reduce his drug operation by targeting Jorge Ochoa's and Gilberto Rodríguez Orejuela's money laundering operations in order to clean his reputation, which gave him a positive image among American government elites. In the late 80's the Noriega regime's relations with the United States deteriorated after Noriega was accused of selling intelligence to Cuba. It was also reported that Hugo Spadafora, Noriega's most prominent critic, reported Noriega's drug operations to the Drug Enforcement Administration. The United States would later invade Panama and capture Noriega, ending his regime. Noriega was later trialed in three countries; France, the United States, and Panama. He eventually died in 2017.

=== Suriname ===
Suriname has been labeled as a narco-state due to the involvement of President Dési Bouterse and his family in drug trafficking. Bouterse was sentenced in absentia in the Netherlands to 11 years' imprisonment after being convicted of trafficking 474 kg (1,045 lb) of cocaine. His son Dino Bouterse has been arrested twice in three different countries and is currently serving 16 years imprisonment in the United States on a charge of drug trafficking.

=== Syria ===
Ba'athist Syria was home to a burgeoning black market drug industry run by associates and relatives of the former Syrian ruler, Bashar al-Assad. The industry was run by a clandestine network of warlords, drug cartels, crime families and business men loyal to the Assad dynasty, operating across the regions of Syria and Lebanon. It mainly produced captagon, an addictive amphetamine popular in the Arab world. Another major drug which was manufactured and smuggled globally is hashish. As of 2021, the export of illegal drugs eclipsed the country's legal exports, leading the New York Times to call Syria "the world's newest narcostate". The drug exports allowed the Assad regime to generate hard currency, pay daily wages for the deteriorating state army, finance private militias and hire mercenaries. Centre of Operational Analysis and Research reported in 2021 that the Assad regime has turned Syria into "the global epicentre of Captagon production, which is now more industrialised, adaptive, and technically sophisticated than ever."

During its occupation of Lebanon between 1976–2005, the Assad regime used its proxies in Lebanon for establishing its multi-billion dollar drug industry. Syria was labeled as a narco-state by the United States for nearly a decade until 1997. Throughout the Syrian occupation of Lebanon when they controlled the cannabis cultivation in the Beqaa Valley in Lebanon, the Assad regime was the Middle East's main source of hashish.

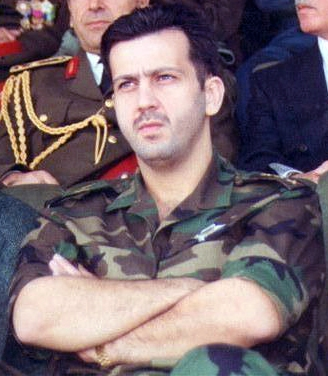
Maher al-Assad, younger brother of Bashar al-Assad and commander of the Republican Guards, oversaw the operations of Syria's drug industry

During the Syrian Civil War, the Assad regime began mass production of drugs within Syria, and officers fed their men fenethylline, which they called "Captain Courage." Several shipments containing tonnes of amphetamines were seized in different countries smuggled from Syria, those shipments had sometimes millions of pills of fenethylline, produced in the country since at least 2006. After 2013, captogen production and export in Syria skyrocketed, with the direct support of the Assad regime, and its multi-billion dollar profits exceeded the total GDP. By 2020, Syria had become the world's biggest centre of captogen production, sales and exports.

In November 2020, two drug shipments of hashish coming from Syria were seized by Egyptian authorities, the first shipment which arrived to Alexandria, included 2 tonnes of hashish, while the second shipment had 6 tonnes and was found at the Damietta port. The port of Latakia became under scrutiny of European and American police, as being favored by smugglers. In May 2021, Turkish security forces used UAVs to stop 1.5 tonnes of marijuana being smuggled out of Syria. According to the Centre for Operational Analysis and Research (COAR), Syrian seized drugs in 2020 had the value of no less than $3.4bn. In late November 2024, Syrian opposition rebels took control of much of Syria, causing Bashar al-Assad and his family to flee the country to Russia, a longtime ally. The Syrian transitional government ordered the cessation of the drug trade.

=== United Kingdom ===
Historians and authors describe the British Empire in the 19th century and the East India Company as history's first major narco-state because of the opium wars and the state-backed drug dealing of opium in China

=== Venezuela ===
Since the late 2010s, Venezuela has been labeled a narco-state due to the relations between some Venezuelan government officials to drug cartels and criminal factions all across Latin America. For example, former vice president of Venezuela Tareck el Aissami has been accused of supporting drug trafficking and helping Mexican drug cartels. El Aissami has been sanctioned by the United States since 2017. The nephews and sons of Venezuela's president Nicolas Maduro are also being accused of financing drug trades and being involved in the Narcosobrinos affair. In November 2017, the United States ambassador to the UN Nikki Haley accused Venezuela of being a "dangerous narco-state".

== See also ==
- Crack epidemic in the United States
- Mafia state
- Narco-submarine
- Narcokleptocracy
- Philippine drug war
- State Sponsors of Terrorism
- State cartel theory
