= Roberto Suárez Gómez =

Bolivian drug trafficker (1932–2000)

- Born: 8 January 1932; Santa Ana del Yacuma, Beni, Bolivia
- Died: 20 July 2000 (aged 68); Santa Cruz de la Sierra, Bolivia
- Other names: King of Cocaine; El Padrino (The Godfather); El Robin Hood del Beni (The Robin Hood of Beni); Don Roberto
- Organization(s): Medellín Cartel; La Corporación
- Successor: Jorge Roca Suarez
- Spouse: Ayda Levy
- Children: 4
- Parent(s): Nicomedes Suárez and Blanca Gómez Roca
- Criminal charges: Drug trafficking and smuggling
- Penalty: 15 years imprisonment

Roberto Suárez Gómez (8 January 1932 – 20 July 2000), also known as the King of Cocaine, was a Bolivian drug lord and trafficker who played a major role in the expansion of cocaine trafficking in Bolivia. In his prime, Suárez made $400 million annually, was one of the major suppliers of the Medellín Cartel as well as the leader of the largest Bolivian drug empire, and was considered to be the biggest cocaine producer in the world.

Born to a prominent family, Suárez entered the drug trade and made millions from cocaine in the 1970s and 1980s. He is known for financing the 1980 coup d'état, known as the "Cocaine Coup", and was a major supplier of cocaine for various criminal organizations. Suárez was arrested in 1988 and sentenced to 15 years in prison, but was released after serving half his sentence. He died on 20 July 2000, from a heart attack.

== Early life ==
Suárez was born on 8 January 1932, to a wealthy cattle-ranching family in the tropical Beni Department of Bolivia. His parents were Nicomedes "Cattle King" Suárez Franco and Blanca Gómez Roca. Suárez was the descendant of the Suárez brothers "rubber barons", famous for expanding the rubber trade worldwide, expanding westernization in the northern Bolivian Amazon, and for singlehandedly financing the Columna Porvenir, during the Acre War with Brazil. He was also the great-grandson of Nicolás Suárez Callaú.

== Criminal career ==
Suarez originally owned airplanes to support his legitimate cattle operations. In the 1970s, Suárez first entered into the cocaine trade, conducting business with the Colombian drug lord Pablo Escobar. Later he recruited Bolivian coca producers into his company "La Corporación" (transl. the corporation). Suárez had a fleet of aircraft, primarily the Cessna 206 and the Douglas DC-3, which flew cocaine shipments from the Bolivian Amazon to Colombia, selling the cocaine at $9,000 per kilogram.

Suárez's wife Ayda Levy recounted in detail that Fidel Castro and Raúl Castro contacted Suárez and Escobar in January 1983 and invited them to Cuba. Upon visiting the island nation, Castro had planned to use drugs as a weapon against "Yankee imperialism". Fidel and Raúl charged millions of dollars per day in exchange for giving coverage to cocaine trafficking and the use of airports for refueling airplanes. In self-defense against the United States Drug Enforcement Administration (DEA), Suárez established his own private air force, as well as a private army of 1,500 soldiers and Libyan-trained bodyguards.

With aid from the Argentine military dictatorship, Suárez financed the military coup and bankrupted the government, which collapsed. The coup installed a dictatorship in 1980, in which Luis García Meza would be president and Suárez's cousin Luis Arce Gómez was Minister of the Interior, and so he received political protection for his enterprise Arce Gómez ordered the killings of many Bolivians, including union leaders and intellectuals such as Marcelo Quiroga Santa Cruz. During the 1980s, Suárez' relationship with Escobar slowly deteriorated because of Escobar's murderous activities, which contrasted with Suárez's use of violence only as a last resort.

In 1981, Suárez's favored son Roberto "Robby" Levy was arrested in Switzerland and was extradited to the United States. In a letter to Ronald Reagan in 1983, Suárez offered to pay Bolivia's foreign debt of more than $3 billion if he and his son received amnesty.

The downfall of Roberto Suárez began when he met undercover DEA agent, Michael Levine in 1980 when Levine was serving as DEA's special agent in charge of undercover operations in the Southern Cone, with a residence in Buenos Aires, Argentina, as Levine recounts in National bestseller The Big White Lie, he was introduced to Suárez by a confidential informant as a Spanish speaking mafioso from the US. After days of negotiations in south America the two contracted for the sale of 1,000 pounds (450 kg) of cocaine to be delivered to Levine in South Florida, at the time the biggest undercover drug deal in history. Also at the time, while among international drug traffickers Suárez was known to be the biggest purveyor of coca base (raw product) and cocaine on earth, he was entirely unknown to the DEA, who at first would not authorize Levine spending any funds on the operation. As Levine describes in his book, he and a small group of dedicated DEA undercover agents had to work around obstacles and dangerous roadblocks put in their path by DEA management, CIA and the Department of Justice to successfully complete the largest undercover cocaine seizure in history at that point. Levine and his team were also able to document CIA protection of the Suárez cartel from prosecution and incarceration in the United States. Levine and his undercover DEA team were also able to document the CIA's role in causing the coca revolution of 17 July 1980, the bloodiest revolution in that nation's history, that had its purpose the destruction of the anti-drug faction in the Bolivian government that had been working with Levine and DEA to bring down the Roberto Suárez organization. Subsequently, on the basis of Levine's book, on 3 March 2011 Bolivian president Evo Morales expelled the DEA from all operations in Bolivia. As a result of the investigation Michael Levine was targeted for death by both the Bolivian Santa Cruz Mafia and the Medellín Cartel who placed a $200,000 price on Levine's head, calling him "El Judio Trigueño" (the Dark Jew). In secret testimony held before the US Senate Kerry Committee, Ramon Milian Rodriguez, convicted of laundering more than $1 billion in drug money for the Medellín Cartel, testified that Suárez was the biggest and most powerful drug trafficker in the world.

== Collaboration with the Nazi criminal Klaus Barbie ==
Roberto Suárez Gómez was collaborating with the Nazi war criminal Klaus Barbie who became the chief of his security service. This notice according to a report Friday 9 by German news weekly "Der Spiegel" in May 2025.

Klaus Barbie (false name used as Klaus Altmann) note as the "Butcher of Lyon" for his war time torture of prisoners, was the Gestapo chief in the occupied French city of Lyon. After the end of World War II he escaped to South America. He took refuge with his wife (married 25 April 1940) Regine Margaretha Maria Willis (1913-1982) and their two children Ute-Messner (born 1941) and Hans-Jörg (1946-1981) in Argentina, but only for a short time before moving to Perù (1968–72) and, in the end, to Bolivia.

Barbie was arrested after being discovered by France's most famous Nazi-hunting couple, Serge Klarsfeld and his wife Beate, the BBC reported. He was extradited to France and died in prison. This Infamous Nazi war criminal helped set up top drug cartel and worked also with Pablo Escobar, report says.

== Arrest and release ==
On 20 July 1988, Suárez was arrested by the Bolivian National Police and his hacienda was raided; more than one and a half tons of cocaine were found. He was sentenced to 15 years in the San Pedro prison for drug trafficking but served only 7 years. He was released in 1996 due to accounts of good behavior and declining health, having suffered two heart attacks in prison. His nephew and successor, Jorge Roca Suárez (known as "Techo de Paja"), was also serving a 30-year sentence in the United States for drug trafficking. During his time in prison, Suárez was said to have shown regret for his crimes, had found religious faith in jail and preferred to be photographed next to images of Jesus Christ. Suárez had lost most of his fortune, spent on the construction of buildings and other philanthropic activities. He spent the remaining years of his life managing his hacienda.

== Personal life ==
Suárez owned various lavish homes in Bolivia, including a hacienda known as "El Mosquito" ("The Mosquito"), in northern Bolivia and an armored palace in Santa Ana del Yacuma. His family owned more than 16 million acres of farmland, which he used for cattle ranching, farming and sometimes airstrips. He gained popularity by building churches, hospitals, streets in rural villages and soccer fields. In his hometown province of Beni, Suárez was most popular around the locals and often called "Robin Hood". His Robin Hood image gained popularity and protection from the Bolivian government and the Roman Catholic Church.

Suárez married Ayda Levy Martínez in 1958 and had four children; Roberto, Gary, Heidy and Harold Suárez Levy. The couple split after Levy discovered his involvement in the drug trade but remained on good terms. Suárez was heavily involved in politics. Suárez's son, Roberto "Robby" Levy, was killed by Bolivian police and DEA agents on 22 March 1990 in Santa Cruz.

== Death and legacy ==
On Thursday evening, 20 July 2000, Suárez died from a heart attack in Santa Cruz, Bolivia. Weeks before his death, in a TV interview, Suárez expressed remorse for his crimes and stated "The worst mistake I ever made in my life was to have gotten involved in cocaine trafficking". Suárez was buried in a small niche in Cochabamba.

The character Alejandro Sosa in the 1983 American crime film Scarface and the 2006 video game Scarface: The World Is Yours was based on Suárez. On 21 November 2012, Suárez's ex-wife Ayda Levy published an account of his life, entitled The King of Cocaine: My Life With Roberto Suárez And The Birth Of The First Narco-State.

== See also ==
- Illegal drug trade in Bolivia
- Coca production in Bolivia
- Luis García Meza
- Sonia Sanjinez De Atala
