= La Corporación =

- Founded: 1970s
- Founder: Roberto Suárez Gómez
- Founding location: Bolivia
- Years active: 1970s-1990
- Ethnicity: Bolivians
- Activities: Drug trafficking and smuggling, money laundering, murder, assassination, political corruption
- Allies: Bolivian military junta Medellín Cartel; Juarez Cartel; Guadalajara Cartel; Contras
- Rivals: DEA; Bolivian constitutional government La Conexión

La Corporación ("The Corporation"), also known as the Santa Ana Cartel, was a Bolivian drug cartel and criminal organization, headed in the 1970s and 1980s by notorious drug lord Roberto Suárez Gómez, known as the "King of Cocaine".

"La Corporación" was founded in the 1970s by several drug traffickers and transnational criminals. After the 1980 coup d'état, "La Corporación" received political protection from the Bolivian military dictatorship, effectively making Bolivia a narco-state, and became one of the largest cocaine producers in the world. They were allied with several Mexican and Colombian drug cartels and had a notable presence in Santa Cruz de la Sierra.

== History ==
In the 1970s, Suárez created "La Corporación" and began hiring various Bolivian coca producers, becoming one of the largest cocaine producers in the country. Because of the relationship with Suárez and Pablo Escobar, "La Corporación" became a major supplier to the Medellín Cartel. Drugs were smuggled from the cocaine labs in the Bolivian Amazon to Colombia, selling at $9,000 per kilo.

On July 17, 1980, a coup d'état overthrew President Lidia Gueiler Tejada, replaced by her cousin Luis García Meza Tejada. The event became known as the "Cocaine Coup" because it was reportedly backed by criminals and drug traffickers, including Suárez and other members of "La Corporación". Shortly after the coup, drug traffickers received political protection and cocaine production dramatically increased in Bolivia. According to members of the Reagan administration, the cartel was making an annual income of more than $400 million and was backed by several right-wing death squads. Ex-DEA agent Michael Levine once accused the CIA of facilitating multiple Latin American drug cartels, most notably "La Corporación".

After Suárez's arrest in 1988, "La Corporación" was headed by his nephew Jorge Roca Suarez, who continued to smuggle drugs into the United States and began a major drug-trafficking operation in Southern California until his arrest in 1990.

== Known members and associates ==
- Roberto Suárez Gómez – founder and leader
- Jorge Roca Suarez – second-in-command, currently serving 30 years for drug trafficking
- Sonia Sanjinez De Atala – drug trafficker, known as the "Queen of Cocaine", currently under a witness protection
- Luis Arce Gómez – ex-Minister of the Interior, found guilty of human rights violations and drug trafficking, sentenced to 30 years imprisonment
- Klaus Barbie – Suárez's head of security, former Gestapo
