= Sonia Sanjinez De Atala =

Bolivian drug trafficker

Sonia Sanjinez de Atala
- Born: c. 1951 (age 74–75); Santa Cruz de la Sierra, Bolivia
- Other name: "La Reina de la Cocaina" ("Queen of Cocaine")
- Occupation: Drug trafficker
- Spouse: Walter Atala
- Children: 4

Sonia Sanjinez de Atala (born c. 1951) is a Bolivian former drug trafficker. A member of "La Corporación" ("The Corporation"), Atala was one of the narcos responsible for the 1980 Bolivian coup d'état, known as the "Cocaine Coup", and the most powerful female drug lord in Bolivia at the time.

== Criminal career ==
Atala was born in Santa Cruz, Bolivia. According to Consortium News, she was the niece of drug trafficker Hugo Hurtado-Candia.

She sold television sets and radios to Panama before she was hired by Luis Arce Gómez to smuggle drugs. She was imprisoned in La Paz under the presidency of Lidia Gueiler Tejada, but for a short period.

After the "Cocaine Coup" in 1980, installed by various Bolivian drug kingpins, Minister of the Interior Luis Arce Gomez put Atala in charge of smuggling cocaine and money laundering operations across the country. She paid her smugglers $20,000 monthly with a $500 tax for each kilogram of cocaine.

According to ex-DEA agent Michael Levine (later her undercover partner), Atala was described as a "very beautiful but deadly woman" who could order people dead anywhere in the country. Her mansion in Santa Cruz was known as the "Torture House" due to her enforcers taking in enemies and torturing them. Atala was protected by an enforcer group made of Neo-Nazi mercenaries trained by Klaus Barbie.

In the mid-1980s, a period where Atala grew too powerful, the Bolivian narco government betrayed her during a cocaine deal with the Medellin Cartel. Atala was on the run from Luis Fernando Arcila Mejia ("Papa Mejia"), a Colombian drug smuggler whom Atala had refused to pay off a drug operation.

Atala was present as a key witness at the trial of Luis Arce Gomez, who pleaded guilty to drug trafficking charges, and received a lighter sentence in return for incriminating information. She is currently under a witness protection program and resides in Santa Cruz, Bolivia.

== Personal life ==
Atala married auto driver Walter "Pachi" Atala when she was 14 years old. They had four children.

== See also ==
- Griselda Blanco
- Illegal drug trade in Bolivia
