= UMOPAR =

Bolivian rural police unit

The Unidad Móvil Policial para Áreas Rurales (UMOPAR), (English: Mobile Police Unit for Rural Areas), was created in 1984 as a unit with within the Bolivian National Police (Cuerpo de Policía Nacional). it is a Bolivian counter-narcotics and counter-insurgency force which was founded by, and is funded, advised, equipped, and trained by the United States government as part of its "war on drugs". It became a subsidiary of the new Special Antinarcotics Force (Fuerza Especial de Lucha Contra el Narcotráfico—FELCN), when the latter was created in 1987.

There have been complaints that UMOPAR, which is effectively controlled by the United States military and Drug Enforcement Administration, was the most powerfully armed and best trained military force in Bolivia. In 1984, UMOPAR troops kidnapped the president of Bolivia, Siles Zuazo, and staged an unsuccessful coup attempt against the Bolivian government.

Bolivian government cooperation with the United States was ended by President Evo Morales. Morales suspended cooperation during the 2008 political crisis, alleging that the US was supporting the opposition. DEA agents were expelled in 2009.

== U.S. involvement ==
Although UMOPAR is technically headed by Defensa Social, a branch of the Bolivian Interior Ministry, they are in practice controlled by DEA and U.S. military officials based at the U.S. Embassy in La Paz, who plan their operations, provide intelligence, and lead the drug raids, using UMOPAR mainly as a "strike force" for U.S. operations.

UMOPAR forces receive extensive training from DEA and U.S. military personnel, including the U.S. Army Special Forces, both in facilities in Bolivia (such as the Garras International Antinarcotics Training School), and at U.S. military bases such as Fort Benning, or the School of the Americas in Panama.

In 1987, under a U.S. State Department contract, an Oregon corporation known as Evergreen International Airlines provided several private military contractor pilots, many of whom had flown for the CIA's Air America in Laos and Cambodia, to transport DEA agents and UMOPAR troops throughout the Upper Huallaga Valley.

In 1988, U.S. Ambassador Rowell decided that UMOPAR troops needed their own air-mobile task force to increase their effectiveness. The United States Department of Defense loaned UMOPAR 12 UH-1H helicopters, and Rowell assigned his U.S. Army-Navy attaché, Lieutenant-Colonel Edward Hayes to command the UMOPAR troops in the unit, which was called the Diablos Rojos (Red Devils).

== Human rights abuses ==
UMOPAR troops have frequently been responsible for beatings, torture, rapes, extortion, robberies, arbitrary shootings, mass arrests without warrants, and various other human rights abuses.

The use of torture by UMOPAR forces has been widespread and systematic, and includes methods such as being hung upside down and beaten, burned with cigarettes, electrocution, death threats, and being submerged underwater to simulate drowning, among other methods.

UMOPAR forces act with almost total impunity, and human rights violations are rarely investigated, much less prosecuted.

Other examples of abuses include:

- In June 1988, UMOPAR troops killed 12 peasants and wounded over 100 in the Massacre of Villa Tunari
- On May 9, 1997, two UMOPAR agents detained and beat a fifteen-year-old girl, Valeriana Condori, during a coca-eradication mission in Uncía.
- In July 1998, Father Hugo Ortiz, a Catholic priest and president of the Asamblea Permanente de Derechos Humanos de Bolivia (APDH), (Permanent Human Rights Assembly of Bolivia), was beaten by UMOPAR troops while travelling to a meeting.
- In September 2000, a 19-year-old boy, Isaac Mejía Arce was tortured to death by UMOPAR troops using a technique known as el arrastre (dragging), where two men sat on top of his body while it was dragged around over the ground (a method frequently used by UMOPAR troops to extract information from suspects). Arce began coughing up blood, and ultimately went into a coma, and died on February 1, 2001.
- In 2002, a member of UMOPAR shot at two government representatives as they were entering a community to investigate human rights violations.

== See also ==
- Law enforcement in Bolivia
- Narcotics in Bolivia
- Plan Colombia
- Peruvian Investigative Police
- Andean Information Network
- Narco News
