= Los Lorenzanas =

Criminal organization in Guatemala

Los Lorenzanas is a criminal organization in Guatemala. The family cartel is considered one of the most powerful drug-trafficking groups in Guatemala, operating primarily in the east and north of the country along the border with Honduras. The group acts as a crucial logistical link for the smuggling of cocaine from South America, via Central America and Mexico, into the United States (as of November 2026).

The United States has designated the group both as a Foreign Terrorist Organization (FTO) and as Specially Designated Global Terrorists (SDGT).

== History ==
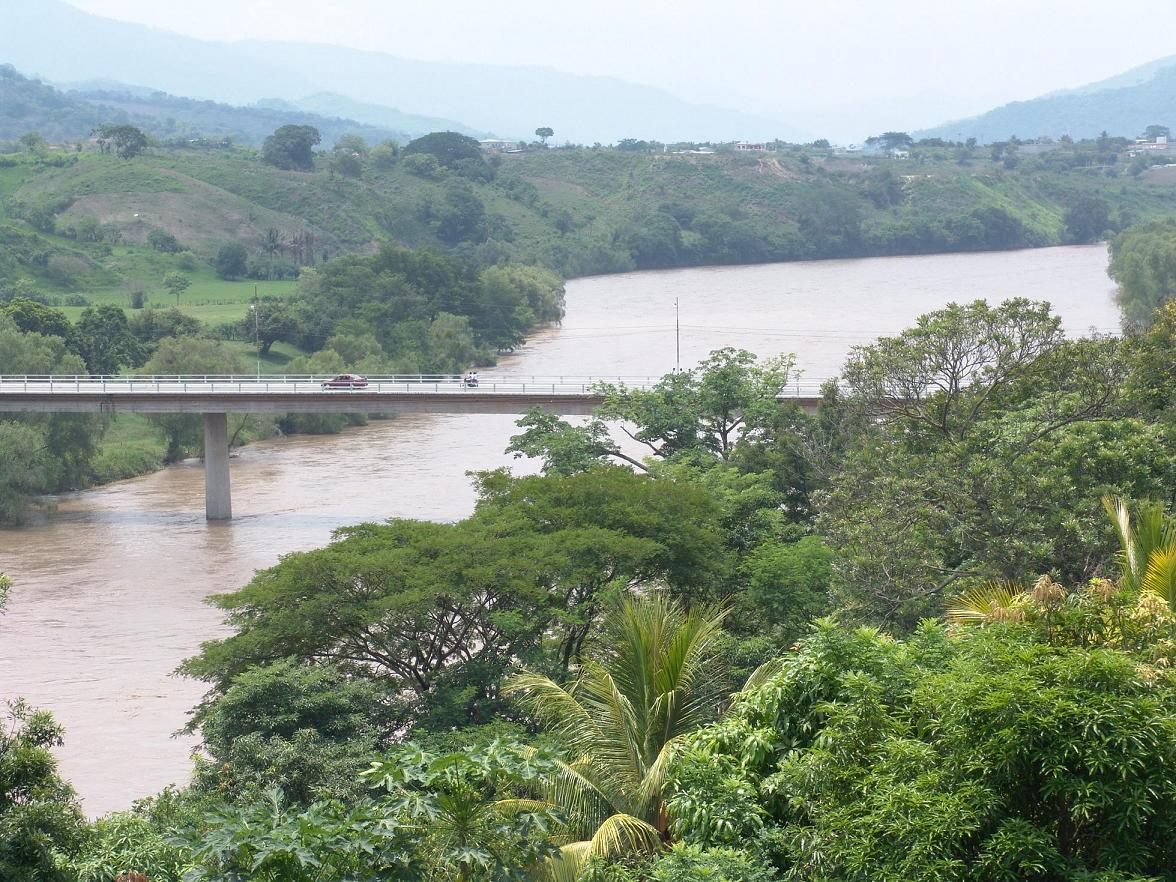
The Puente Gualán bridge is located in the heart of the Los Lorenzanas clan's territory in Zacapa. Because the clan relies on the road infrastructure surrounding the Río Motagua to smuggle drugs and goods from Honduras, the bridges and access routes in Gualán serve as strategically vital chokepoints for shipments moving through eastern Guatemala.

Originally, the family was involved in the traditional smuggling of consumer goods in eastern Guatemala. With the emergence of South American drug routes, the clan leveraged its existing networks for the transport of cocaine. The organization was founded by Waldemar Lorenzana Lima, known as "El Patriarca."

The headquarters is located in the border region of Zacapa, near Honduras. From there, the group receives drug shipments, stores them on its own estates, and smuggles them further north.

Since the 2000s the clan has worked closely with the Mexican Sinaloa Cartel. According to U.S. investigators, there are also links to Venezuelan networks as well as to the Honduran Valle Cartel.

Following a major wave of arrests that began in 2011, Waldemar Lorenzana Lima and his children Eliu, Waldemar, Haroldo Jeremías, and Marta Julia were taken into custody and extradited to the United States. Waldemar Lorenzana Lima died in a U.S. prison in 2021, while his four children are serving long-term or life sentences.

Despite the dismantling of the old leadership, younger family members took control. Following the handover of the old leadership to the US, bloody succession struggles erupted within the clan. In March 2022, the than 26-year-old grandson Hans Broiner Lemus Lorenzana was executed riddled with more than 80 bullets alongside two bodyguards at a restaurant in Zacapa. Investigators suspect this was the result of an internal power struggle involving his cousin, Haroldo Waldemar Lorenzana Terraza (“Haroldito”), who is believed to be the current leader. The U.S. Department of State has offered a reward of up to $5 million for information leading to his capture.

In late May 2026, about 100 armed and masked men in 20 vehicles attacked the border community of San José Las Lágrimas, Chiquimula Department, located on the border with Honduras. According to InSight Crime and accounts from local residents, the clan set fires and forcibly displaced the local population in order to secure a new land corridor for cocaine smuggling on behalf of the Sinaloa Cartel.

Julio Portillo Paz a MP of Guatemalan congress for the department of Zacapa was assinated in an executing style on November 6, 2026, by an armed ambush on his motorcade in Río Hondo, Zacapa, which also claimed the lives of three National Civil Police officers. The perpetrators were not identified but the case is seen as connected to narcatopolitics.

In November 2026 the US has designated the mafia groups Los Lorenzanas, Los Huistas and Los Mendoza as a Foreign Terrorist Organization (FTO) and as Specially Designated Global Terrorists (SDGT). All three organizations and their members are subject to comprehensive financial sanctions, which result in the freezing of their assets under U.S. jurisdiction.

== Political Involement ==
Investigations by the former UN anti-corruption commission, CICIG, and U.S. authorities revealed that drug clans such as the Los Lorenzanas had, for decades, helped fund presidential and parliamentary election campaigns at the national level in Guatemala in order to purchase political favor at the highest levels.

In its stronghold of Zacapa, specifically in the municipality of Huité as well as in the neighboring provinces of Izabal and Chiquimula, the clan traditionally provides funding to local mayors and regional politicians. In return, local authorities and police forces act as a protective shield for its drug-trafficking operations.

Members of the family established legitimate construction companies that, through political connections, secured millions in funding from public infrastructure projects. These firms served both to launder money and to develop roads that the clan used for its smuggling routes.
