= Special Force to Fight Drug Trafficking =

Bolivian police unit

The Bolivian Special Force to Fight Drug Trafficking or Special Antinarcotics Force (Spanish: Fuerza Especial de Lucha Contra el Narcotráfico, FELCN) is a section of the Bolivian National Police focused on fighting the country's drug trade. It largely focuses on the production of cocaine and its precursors from coca leaves grown in the country. The FELCN was created on 24 July 1987, and took over supervision of the Rural Mobile Patrol (UMOPAR). UMOPAR, popularly known as "The Leopards" (Los Leopardos), was formed in late 1983 under a United States-funded program designed to eradicate the nation's cocaine trade and in accordance with four treaties on narcotics, signed by both countries on August 11, 1983.

As of the late 1980s, FELCN and UMOPAR comprised about 6,000 members. Both were highly militarized police units. By early 1989, FELCN had its own intelligence service, which was charged with collecting evidence on individuals suspected of narcotics trafficking. During the late 1980s and 1990s, according to an investigation of Bolivian policing, FELCN, UMOPAR, and the US Drug Enforcement Administration "constituted the three armed branches of the fight against narcotrafficking. These three forces, supported by an important external financing, carried out a very hardline policy of interdiction and eradication of coca."
