= Los Mendoza =

Los Mendozas Cartel
- Mendozas DTO
- Founded: January 1, 1980; 46 years ago
- Founder: Carlos Alberto Rosales Mendoza (also known as "El Tísico" or "The Tubercular")
- Founding location: Petén, Guatemala
- Years active: 1980–present
- Territory: Guatemala: Petén and major operational hubs in the departments of San Marcos and Huehuetenango
- Membership: 300-500
- Leaders: Eduardo Mendoza and Francisco Mendoza
- Criminal activities: Drug trafficking, arms trafficking, human trafficking, torture, smuggling, money laundering, prostitution, land crapping, political violence, crime as a service, illegal mining and illegal trade in raw materials, etc.

Los Mendoza is a criminal organization from and in Guatemala. The organization is the oldest active and considered one of the most powerful drug-trafficking groups in Guatemala, controlling strategigly important smuggeling corridors along the border to Mexico. The organization has it's roots in the Mendoza family and the leading structure is based on the brothers Haroldo, Walter Obdulio, Milton Oswaldo and Edwin Alfredo Mendoza Matta. The Mendozas’ base of operations is in Peten Departement, the northern-most province of Guatemala that lies along borders with Belize and Mexico. The HQ is based in its hometown of Morales.

La Mendoza acts as a key logistics and transport partner for major Mexican cartels, such as the Sinaloa Cartel and the Jalisco New Generation Cartel (CJNG) (as of November 2026).

The criminal group is also terrorrazing the local citizen by land grabbing for the purposes of livestock farming and agriculture. The cartel is executing illegal mining in the region. Contract killings are used to assert one's own power.

== Activity ==
The activities of these criminal groups cover a wide spectrum and reach deep into society. Their primary source of income is the transit of illegal drugs; in addition, they engage in human trafficking, extortion, kidnapping, and the operation of prostitution rings.

They generate and launder money through palm oil plantations and cattle ranches. Furthermore, they act as a private army for corporations, targeting labor union members.

=== Drug transit ===
Los Mendoza structures are a central transport and intermediary partner for the Mexican Sinaloa Cartel (as well as, historically, for other cartels). The organization receives shipments of cocaine, fentanyl, and methamphetamine from South America, stores them temporarily, and facilitates their movement across borders toward Mexico and the United States. The clan controls strategic border crossings in the Guatemalan departments of Petén, Izabal, San Marcos, and Huehuetenango. For the Logistic services Los Mendozas operates a network of secret landing strips for smuggling aircraft, hideouts, warehouses, and local protection forces.

=== Land crapping and farming ===
The cartel operates and controls agricultural production in the region. Over the course of decades, the clan has seized large tracts of land by driving small-scale farmers and local communities off their property through threats and violence.

The family invests heavily in cattle farming, operating livestock ranches as well as in palm oil plantations. In this way, alongside the profits generated from agricultural production, drug money is channeled into the legal economy.

=== Illegal mining ===
Los Mendozas are using the Port of Santo Tomas de Castilla to smuggel gold and jade from illegal minining

According to investigations by InSight Crime, the cartel has developed another line of business: it uses its logistics network and bribed officials to smuggle tons of unprocessed raw jade out of the country via the port of Santo Tomás de Castilla. In the process, the cargo is frequently misdeclared for instance, as worthless construction stone (serpentinite).

=== Real estate ===
Another business sector is real estate investment. The criminals orchestrate the development of large-scale real estate projects in Petén, Izabal, and the border region with Mexico.

Aus of 2020 of the Mendoza leading figures are thought to have left Peten region, or to be regularly using Belize as a refuge.

== Backing structures ==
Over the years, the clan built an extensive network of corruption and political alliances. It invested drug money into cattle ranching, palm oil plantations, real estate, and even a local soccer club like the Heredia Jaguars. Former Guatemalan President Álvaro Colom once described the Mendozas as the kind of "narcos whom no one touches."

=== "Génesis" case ===
In 2019, Wálter Obdulio Mendoza Matta was sentenced to 16 years in prison for aggravated land usurpation and money laundering in the "Génesis" case, which involved the illicit appropriation of 28 properties in Petén. However, an appeals court later reduced his sentence to eight years, and he has since been released.

Unlike other cartel bosses, Mendoza members were not extradited to the United States and were released after serving their prison sentences in Guatemala. Observers and investigators from the former UN anti-corruption commission (CICIG) repeatedly criticized the unusual leniency shown by Guatemalan courts toward the clan.

For instance, Judge Abelina Cruz dismissed a serious case against clan leader Haroldo Mendoza Matta involving charges of murder, kidnapping, and land theft without the Attorney General's Office filing an appeal.

=== Local politics ===
The clan leverages its real estate and land holdings as well as campaign contributions to mayors to secure political protection and social influence. A mayor in Peten province reportedly received campaign donations in 2011 from the Mendozas after he shelled out nearly $2 million on a stadium for a soccer team owned by the family.

In 1999, the banana company Bandegua, Guatematecan subsidiary of Del Monte Foods officially hired the Mendoza family to serve as a private "security group" (grupo de seguridad). At the time, the corporation was embroiled in a severe labor dispute with the trade union Sitrabi regarding a new collective bargaining agreement in the Izabal region.

Acting on behalf of the plantation management, the Mendozas intimidated union members and violently suppressed protests in order to fend off demands for higher wages. In October 1999, an armed group linked to both the clan and the local plantation infrastructure stormed the union office in Morales (Izabal) and, at gunpoint, forced the union leaders to sign an agreement favorable to the company and to resign from their positions.

In addition to Del Monte, other local large landowners, cattle ranchers, and palm oil producers in northeastern Guatemala, particularly in Izabal and Petén also made use of the Mendoza family's armed structures. They relied on the cartel to resolve land disputes with small-scale farmers in their favor or used its assistance to collect extortion payments.

== History ==
In the 1980s, the Mendoza Matta family began smuggling contraband, stolen vehicles, and livestock in the Guatemalan regions of Izabal, specifically in Morales and Petén.

As the cocaine trade from South America to the United States grew, the cartel became involved in drug trafficking. At the same time, the family seized vast tracts of land by forcibly displacing small-scale farmers. By the late 1990s, reports indicate that the family was even hired by fruit companys to act as a private security force for the purpose of suppressing labor disputes.

When the Mexican cartel Los Zetas expanded into Guatemala, the Mendoza family lost territories that had been the subject of bloody conflict. From 2014 onward, the clan's leadership increasingly became a target for the justice system: clan leader Haroldo Mendoza Matta was arrested in 2014 for murder and kidnapping, while his brother, Walter Obdulio, was sentenced to 16 years in prison in 2019 for money laundering.

In early November Member of Parliament Julio Portillo and three police officers were killed in an armed attack in Zacapa. In mid-November 2026, the U.S. government officially designated Los Mendoza, along with the Los Lorenzanas and Los Huistas gangs as a foreign terrorist organization and imposed sweeping sanctions through the U.S. Department of the Treasury (OFAC). Shortly thereafter, following a wave of violence, the Guatemalan government deployed the military to the affected regions in the south and north. At the same time Guatemala government declared a 30-day state of emergency in November 2026 across its eastern departments of Zacapa and Izabal to combat escalating cartel violence.
