= Julio Portillo =

Guatemalan member of parliament for the department of Zacapa

Julio César Portillo Paz was a Guatemalan member of parliament for the department of Zacapa. He was originally elected with the Cabal party before later joining the National Unity of Hope (UNE). He was assinated on November 6, 2026, by an armed ambush on his motorcade in Río Hondo, Zacapa, which also claimed the lives of three National Civil Police officers. The perpetrators were not identified.

== Live ==
Portillo was born on December 2, 1990, in Zacapa and worked as an public accountant before entering politics.

As MP he served as vice president of the Foreign Relations Committee and the Food Security Committee. He also acted as secretary of the Indigenous Peoples Committee. He co-signed 44 legislative bills focusing on agriculture, fuel, pensions, public services, education, health, and citizen security. Notable initiatives included the Temporary Tax Extinction Law on Energy for Fuel Consumers and the Single Property Tax Law.

Portillo was elected to the Tenth Legislature (2024–2028) representing Zacapa under the Cabal party. Portillo represented the Zacapa constituency in Congress. Located in eastern Guatemala, the region lies along strategically important drug traffiking routes and has been controlled for decades by the Lorenzana criminal family clan.

In April 2025, Zacapa party initiated his expulsion following allegations from the mayor of La Unión, Zacapa, regarding alleged requests for illegal commissions on municipal projects.

Julio Portillo was assinated on November 6, 2026, by an armed ambush on his motorcade in Río Hondo, Zacapa. Unidentified armed men opened fire with high-caliber weapons on Portillo's SUV and his police escort during the afternoon. Three PNC officers assigned to his security detail Jorge Paau Xicol, Érick Armides Ramos Osorio, and Fernando Reyes Aldana died at the scene while attempting to repel the attack. Two additional officers on his security detail survived unharmed.

The murder of Portillo was preceded, in late September 2026, by bloody clashes between drug gangs in the municipality of Huité (also located in the department of Zacapa), which left eight people dead. Zacapa is known for deep-seated entanglements between local political networks and organized crime. Shortly before his death, Portillo had switched from the Cabal party to the opposition party Unidad Nacional de la Esperanza (UNE); he had previously been granted enhanced police protection due to death threats directed at him and his family. Furthermore, he himself faced allegations of corruption in connection with the awarding of government contracts.

Following the assassination and subsequent outbreaks of gang violence in the area, President Bernardo Arévalo declared a 30-day state of emergency across the departments of Zacapa and Izabal on November 14, 2026.
