= Corruption in Bolivia =

Location of Bolivia

Corruption in Bolivia is a major problem that has been called an accepted part of life in the country. It can be found at all levels of Bolivian society. Citizens of the country perceive the judiciary, police and public administration generally as the country's most corrupt. Corruption is also widespread among officials who are supposed to control the illegal drug trade and among those working in and with extractive industries.

Many Bolivians are uneducated and thus unaware of their rights as citizens or of laws against corruption.

== Background ==
Ever since Bolivia was freed from Spanish rule in 1825, the country has experienced considerable instability. The government has been overthrown over 200 times and the constitution rewritten. Widespread poverty has been a major factor in the country's poor development and poor governance.

In the latter half of the 20th century, the government was passed back and forth between civilian and military control repeatedly, some of them notorious for corruption. In 1980-81, when Luis García Meza Tejada was dictator, several thousand civil servants were prosecuted for embezzlement; in 1986, García Meza was charged with treason, sedition, and many other crimes, along with 55 of his associates; he fled the country in 1989.

Victor Paz Estenssoro’s government (1985-89) introduced a degree of stability and democracy. Under Gonzalo “Goni” Sanchez de Lozada, president from 1993 to 1997 and from 2002 to 2003, however, witness the selling off state industries in a process that was widely viewed as corrupt, with many of the purchasers being firms with whom he had close ties.

Evo Morales, elected Bolivia's president in December 2005, convinced poor and middle-class voters that his promised social revolution would overcome establishment corruption. Increased revenues from the exploitation of Bolivia's rich natural resources helped improve macro-economic performance during the decade between 2002 and 2012. Transparency has also improved under Morales. Nonetheless, Bolivia remains the poorest nation in South America, with real GDP lower than it was a generation ago and most of the population still living below the poverty line.

== Indicators, perceptions, and attitudes ==
Transparency International's 2025 Corruption Perceptions Index gave Bolivia a score of 28 on a scale from 0 ("highly corrupt") to 100 ("very clean"). When ranked by score, Bolivia ranked 136th among the 182 countries in the Index, where the country ranked first is perceived to have the most honest public sector. For comparison with regional scores, the best score among the countries of the Americas (Note: Argentina, Bahamas, Barbados, Belize, Bolivia, Brazil, Canada, Chile, Colombia, Costa Rica, Cuba, Dominica, Dominican Republic, Ecuador, El Salvador, Grenada, Guatemala, Guyana, Haiti, Honduras, Jamaica, Mexico, Nicaragua, Panama, Paraguay, Peru, Saint Lucia, Saint Vincent and the Grenadines, Suriname, Trinidad and Tobago, United States of America, Uruguay, Venezuela) was 75, the average score was 42 and the worst score was 10. For comparison with worldwide scores, the best score was 89 (ranked 1), the average score was 42, and the worst score was 9 (ranked 181, in a two-way tie).

In 2012, the World Bank gave Bolivia a score of 38.9 for corruption on the Worldwide Governance Indicators scale from 0 (worst) to 100 (best), a decline from 2007 (43.7) but an improvement over 2009 (29.2). From 2007 to 2011, 80% of citizens thought corruption had worsened or stayed constant. A 2010 report suggested that citizens’ perception of the level of public-sector corruption was worse than the actual scale of such corruption. Business executives, by contrast, saw the situation as having improved since 2009.

Inhabitants of Bolivia tend to consider the state “hopelessly corrupt,” yet under Morales, paradoxically, have allowed it to control an ever-greater portion of the economy, greatly expanding opportunities for corruption. A 2015 report found that while Bolivians do not consider Morales personally corrupt, and re-elected him handily in October 2014, they do think there is more corruption than ever and that it is the fault of the government.

There is a degree of tolerance toward government corruption in Bolivia, a belief that it is acceptable given the “good things” the government does for the people. Many Bolivians subscribe to the traditional belief that only a fool does not take advantage of every opportunity to enrich himself, whether illicitly or not; others believe that with the ascent of Morales, who is an indigenous person, it is now the turn of that group to reap the benefits of corruption as other groups have done before. Indeed, a belief in the importance of group identify, and consequently a tendency to embrace the attitudes of the collective, often trumps individual ethics in Bolivian society.

== Government corruption ==
Government bureaucracy is seen as inefficient, bloated, and full of clientelism, and is considered (along with the police) one of the most corrupt sectors in the country. Hiring and promotion are politically driven and lacking in transparency.

Government officials tend to treat public financial data as their own property and tend not to grasp their obligation to provide information to the public. In 2010, Bolivia scored 13 out of 100 on the Open Budget Index, the worst performance for any Latin American country, but an improvement on its 2008 score of 7.

Some reports suggest that rampant corruption within the government and elite perpetuate poverty and make it impossible for advancement. The Bertelsmann Foundation stated in 2012 that despite laws and safeguards, local government partakes in illicit enrichment schemes.

In 2011, Flores Roberts, governor of Pando, was accused of establishing front companies. A former employee who reported him to the police, Claudia Silvana Salas, was later arrested and imprisoned on extortion charges and was receiving “anonymous threats.”

Over 200 individuals, including government officials and friends and members of Morales's MAS party, ended up being accused of corruption in connection with the fund's disbursements. It was noted that the first person to draw attention to corruption at the fund, back in 2012, was Jacobo Soruco Cholima, head of a Rural Workers’ Union, who was murdered in June of that year, apparently in retaliation for his whistleblowing.

In February 2016, Morales was accused of influence-peddling involving a Chinese construction firm, CAMC, for which his ex-girlfriend, Gabriela Zapata, worked and which received lucrative government contracts. Journalist Carlos Valverde, who made the relationship public, charged that Morales had used his position to help advance Zapata’s career. Valverde noted that the value of Bolivia's contracts with the firm rose from $214 million to over half a billion dollars after the firm hired Zapata. Zapata was arrested in late February.

Also in February 2016, six people died when protesters set fire to the municipal offices in the indigenous city of El Alto. The fire was blamed on former officials who allegedly sought to destroy documents relating to a probe into their own corrupt activities.

=== Private property ===
Although the constitution guarantees the right to private property, this right is often infringed, with expropriation occurring frequently.

=== Customs ===
Bolivia's customs service is highly corrupt and inefficient, with more than one in three respondents in a survey saying that they had paid a bribe to customs officers during the previous year.

=== Taxation ===
The complexity of Bolivian tax law provides opportunities for corruption.

A 2009 report stated that improved inspection control, involving the use of a so-called “process flow approach,” has helped reduce corruption in the tax service and reduced loss of public funds.

=== Elections ===
Elections themselves are generally considered free and fair, although campaign financing safeguards are highly inadequate. In 2009 elections, EU observers reported widespread abuse of the public budget by incumbents, with campaigns being partly financed by civil servants' salaries. A 2010 report found Bolivia the weakest of all Latin American countries in this regard and noted the lack of limits on political donations and the absence of any law requiring disclosure thereof.

=== Bribery ===
Bribery is a crime in Bolivia, but a 2011 survey found that one of every three Bolivians had to pay a bribe in that year. The worst offenders were the judiciary, police and customs service.

=== Impunity ===
Officials charged with corruption are very often given immunity from prosecution in violation of the constitutional. Congress must approve in advance of any legal action against the executive. In 2014, Ever Moya, the former president of the Human Rights Committee, resigned after several corruption complaints he had submitted met with official indifference.

== Judiciary ==
The judiciary is viewed as Bolivia's most corrupt sector. It is weak, inefficient, short on resources, and subject to interference by politicians, with court decisions often being influenced by bribery. Its independence was challenged in 2010 when Morales appointed five judges to the Supreme Court, Constitutional Court, and Judicial Council. Prosecutors are not independent, and they have often targeted opposition-party politicians and their supporters. Also, the 2009 Constitution placed indigenous courts on a par with the mainstream judicial system, which causes conflicts, confusion, difficulties, and delays. In 2015 Morales “called for a referendum designed to root out corruption in the judicial system.”

In 2014, the Senate called on the attorney general to suspend 300 of Bolivia's 508 public prosecutors for corruption and other offenses. Between January and August 2014, 45 prosecutors were disbarred, twice the number disbarred in 2013.

== Police and narcotics trafficking ==
Police corruption is a major problem, owing partly to low wage and poor training. The police are generally viewed as the nation's third most corrupt institution, and corruption is widely seen as the main impediment to legitimate crime-fighting. In six years, three police chiefs have been fired for corruption or abuse of power. Many police officers have ties to organized crime, mainly drug traffickers, and many are appointed to senior positions, a power that is exclusively exercised by the president, because of their political connections.

The narcotics police and secret police have been involved in cocaine trafficking since the late 1950s, with cocaine producers and traffickers being treated as respectable businessmen and coexisting peacefully with one government after another. Large-scale drug-related corruption in Bolivia's military and police force dates back to the 1970s and intensified in 1980-81, when dictator Luis García Meza Tejada's “inner cabinet” was packed with persons involved in cocaine trafficking, notably Colonel Ariel Coca and Colonel Luis Arce Gómez. In 1988, Bolivia's foreign minister charged that narcotics traffickers were trying to influence policy, and a secret videotape of politicians and military officers socializing with a drug kingpin, Roberto Suárez Gómez, was shown on television. In the same year it was reported that police and prosecutors were returning large drug finds to narcotics traffickers and turning only small caches over to the authorities. President Jaime Paz Zamora (1989–93) was friendly with two “drug barons,” Carmelo “Meco” Domínguez and Isaac “Oso” Chavarría. Over the decades there have been repeated scandals concerning official involvement in trafficking, and they have resulted in many firings but not very many prosecutions; also, those removed from their positions because of such involvement have tended to be lower-level people, while guilty higher-ups have generally been left alone to continue operating.

Bolivia has become a regional drug-trafficking hub through which narcotics are funneled to Argentina and Brazil. One reason for this is the corruption and incompetence of the police. Many police officers are directly involved in trafficking, while others accept payoffs to facilitate shipments. In 2011, Rene Sanabria, then head of a police intelligence center, and former national police commissioner pled guilty to U.S. cocaine trafficking charges.

In 2011, the reputation of the police was damaged by a probe of forty officers suspected of ties to drug trafficking. Also, the former anti-drug czar, René Sanabria, was arrested in Panama and tried in the U.S. on drug-trafficking charges.

In January 2015, 20 prosecutors, 18 judges, and 12 police officials who had handled corruption and drug- trafficking cases were investigated for irregularities in their declarations of assets. One police colonel, for example, had accumulated nearly $145,000 over ten years on a salary of about $400 a month, and had reported the purchase of five properties while omitting the purchase of two additional properties.

In May 2015, the problem of police corruption in Bolivia was highlighted by the case of Martín Belaunde Lossio, a Peruvian politician and businessman, whose escape from house arrest in Bolivia was believed to be made possible by paid-off police officers. “Some groups within our institutions, such as the police,” commented Morales, “are creating a bad image of Bolivia.”

The national police's Office of Professional Responsibility (OPR) investigates cases of police corruption and may sanction officers for minor infractions. Major violations are prosecuted by the Attorney General. An observer has stated that Bolivia's police force needs a “complete overhaul” in order to combat drug trafficking and other international crime. One study suggested that government intervention allowed for corruption, and therefore taking a less hands-on approach would decrease corruption significantly.

== Business ==
Companies consider corruption a major obstacle for business in the country. About a fifth of them expect to pay bribes to civil servants to do business. Bureaucratic procedures are complex and burdensome, and often involve illegal “facilitation payments.” Several sectors, notably public procurement and natural-resources extraction, are characterized by extensive patronage networks and clientelism. The risk of corruption is especially high when business must deal with the justice system, where bribes often must be paid in exchange for favorable decisions. One example of favoritism was the courts' refusal to take a 2015 case involving a catering company owned by a sister-in-law of the vice-president.

Companies are also likely to encounter corruption when dealing with the public services sector, in which bribes are often required in exchange for licenses and permits. The same is true of the land administration sector, because property rights are not often protected in practice and expropriation is common, with compensation amounts being determined by negotiations rather than through consistent and transparent processes. Corruption in the tax bureau and customs sectors also impact companies doing business in Bolivia; in the latter sector, corruption occurs more often importing goods, rather than when exporting goods.

=== Product procurement ===
The product procurement sector is especially corrupt, with bribes being exchanged for government contracts and public funds often being diverted to favored companies and individuals.

=== Natural resources ===
Bolivia is rich in natural resources, a sector that is highly prone to corruption worldwide. The country is very dependent on extractives, with revenues making up almost a fifth of the national budget. The 2009 Constitution nationalized all hydrocarbon resources; oil and gas production is now under the purview of the government firm YPFB. The fact that the government controls both operation and regulation in this sector is widely seen as increasing opportunities for corruption. Scandals involving nepotism, kickbacks, and other forms of corruption have plagued the YPFB for years and led to the firing and imprisonment of several individuals.

Corruption played a key role in the nationalization process, with leaders of YPFB being sent to prison in 2011 for bribery and influence-peddling. These events intensified the widespread sense that the government's claim to be fighting corruption is insincere.

In 2009, an executive of a Bolivian-Argentine hydrocarbon firm, Cartler Uniservice, was shot in La Paz while allegedly delivering a large kickback to the family of the then president of YPFB, Santos Ramirez, and a close friend of Morales's. Ramirez was fired and given a 12-year prison sentence. In 2012, in a case called “Santos Ramitez II,” two other YPFB officials were charged with bribery, abuse of public resources, and illicit enrichment. In 2014 four top officials at YPFB were arrested for corruption, and two more for influence peddling.

Local communities officially control their own natural resources, but are not protected from federal intervention, and are susceptible to corruption by government agencies or corporations. Citizens' constitutional right of access to financial information about extractive industries is not always respected.

== Organized crime ==
As noted, police and customs authorities often collude with organized criminals, although other sectors are also affected by this sort of activity.

== Money-laundering ==
Laws against money laundering are considered insufficient and ineffective.

== Media ==
Bolivia ranks 108th of 179 countries for press freedom. Although freedom of expression and of the media are technically permitted, the government controls the allocation of licenses for print and broadcasting media. However, it is said that the state does not censor internet media.

Media firms are not mandated to disclose ownership information, which makes possible conflicts of interest and erodes transparency.

Morales has placed legal, political, and economic pressure on opposition media, and such pressure has led to journalistic self-censorship. The government did not investigate the 2012 murder of two journalists. The media are considered “partly free.” A law forbidding expression of “racism” in the media is considered an attempt by the ruling regime to silence opposition criticism of pro-indigent government actions.

== Anti-corruption efforts ==
The Law against Corruption, Illicit Enrichment, and the Investigation of Assets criminalizes most forms of corruption. The Anti-Corruption Law of 2010 which applies to all public officials and has no statute of limitations, does not specifically address narcotics-related corruption, but was used in 2011 to bring narcotics charges and to indict judges for dismissing narcotics charges. A law adopted in 2004 requires all executive-branch institutions to make their budget information public and respond in a timely way to information requests. There are several more laws in place to prevent corruption in its various forms. None of these laws, however, is adequately enforced.

Transparency International stated in 2012 that Bolivia has made “significant efforts” to improve transparency, and noted Morales's declaration of “zero tolerance” of corruption, but acknowledged that anti-corruption laws continue to be poorly enforced and that corruption therefore remains a serious problem.

The Ministry of Anticorruption and Transparency, founded in 2009, is tasked with promoting anti-corruption policies and investigating corruption cases at every level in every government branch. In March 2010, Congress passed a law that gives the state broad authority to prove private and public corruption. An April 2011 law seeks to reduce corruption in the police force. The National Council Against Corruption is charged with monitoring the National Plan against Corruption's progress.

In 2005, Bolivia ratified the UN's 2003 anti-corruption convention, although it neglected to join an initiative to inhibit the bribing of public officials. Bolivia is also part of the Organization of American States’ Inter-American Convention against Corruption, with an ombudsman appointed to protect human rights and guard against government abuse.

Bolivia is not a member of the International Centre for Settlement of Investment Disputes, but is a signatory of the 1958 New York Convention on the Recognition and Enforcement of Foreign Arbitral Awards. The Red Participación y Justicia is an anti-corruption coalition that is made up of more than one hundred organizations.

Several CSOs address transparency and corruption. A 2016 OAS report called for greater anti-corruption efforts in Bolivia and praised certain best practices, such as the “Mi Plataforma” initiative at the Ministry for Institutional Transparency and Fight against Corruption and the Executive Branch Ministries Master Salary Scale instituted by the Ministry of Economy and Public Finance. The UNODC's Bolivia Country Programme 2010-2015 includes an anti-corruption component. Along with other ministries, the UNODC developed seven educational games to raise awareness about corruption which have been used in schools, parks, and fairs to encourage civic involvement in fighting corruption.

A September 2015 article in Foreign Policy described how La Paz “freed itself from a ubiquitous culture of corruption.” This took place thanks to Juan Del Granado, elected mayor in 1999 on a platform of “transformation.” When he ordered fuel for municipal vehicles and the supplier handed him a check for $1,000, the usual kickback, he expelled the man from city hall. He set in place a zero-tolerance policy on graft. Former mayors, including Gaby Candia, Lupe Andrade, and Germán Monroy Chazarreta, were prosecuted and jailed. In 2004, Del Granado established a Transparency Unit, which provided a special telephone tip line, email address, and online complaints procedure for reporting corruption, and whose staffers posed as public-service users to ferret out officials who demanded irregular fees and bribes. Del Granado also instituted rewards for good practice, giving out awards to “efficient, transparent, cordial, and honest” city employees. In addition, he vigorously enforced the 1990 Financial Administration System and Governmental Control Act (SAFCO) and encouraged citizen participation in neighborhood governance.

== See also ==
- International Anti-Corruption Academy
- Group of States Against Corruption
- International Anti-Corruption Day
- ISO 37001 Anti-bribery management systems
- United Nations Convention against Corruption
- OECD Anti-Bribery Convention
- Transparency International
