= Santa Cruz Cartel =

Bolivian drug cartel

- Years active: 1980s – present
- Territory: Santa Cruz Department
- Ethnicity: Bolivians
- Activities: Drug trafficking, money laundering, murder, car bombing, assassination
- Allies: Medellín Cartel, Cali Cartel, Comando Vermelho
- Rivals: La Corporación, Bolivian government

The Santa Cruz Cartel (Spanish: Cártel de Santa Cruz) or La Conexión is a Bolivian drug cartel and criminal organization, said to be one of the largest in the country, headquartered in Santa Cruz de la Sierra.

The cartel was responsible for multiple narco-terrorist incidents in the 1980s, including assassination attempts on Drug Enforcement Administration agents and bombing attempts on politicians.

The Santa Cruz Cartel is strongly allied with drug trafficking organizations in Colombia, Brazil and Mexico, though is involved in various turf wars against smaller drug gangs. Local intelligence states that members of the Comando Vermelho (Red Command) drug gang have fled the favelas of Brazil to Santa Cruz in order to escape the Federal Police.
