= Jorge Roca Suárez =

Bolivian drug trafficker (born 1951)

- Born: 1951 (age 74–75); Bolivia
- Other names: George Roca; Techo de Paja ("Straw Roof")
- Spouse: Cecilia Beatrice Roca Torres
- Children: 4
- Relatives: Roberto Suárez Gómez (uncle)
- Status: Incarcerated
- Convictions: Drug trafficking and smuggling, money laundering, tax evasion, fraud
- Penalty: 30 years' imprisonment

Jorge Roca Suárez (born 1951), also known as "Techo de Paja", is a Bolivian drug trafficker, best known for being the nephew and successor of notorious drug lord Roberto Suárez Gómez.

== Criminal career ==
Before working with his uncle, Suárez ran a used-car business in Los Angeles. Suárez began to be involved in the drug trade by supplying cocaine to Los Pepes and laundering the drug money from Bolivia to the United States. At his prime, Suárez's net worth was estimated around $50–60 million and owned cattle ranches in Beni, a horse club, a supermarket chain and a luxury home in Santa Cruz de la Sierra. Suárez led massive drug operations in Bolivia and soon became the most wanted fugitive in Bolivia after the arrest of his uncle. While the family income in 1985 was $2,121,053, Suárez evaded tax incomes, which would have lowered the monetary value to $75,536.92.

== Arrest ==
On December 16, 1990, Jorge Roca Suárez and his wife Cecilia were arrested after a DEA raid on Suárez's 19-room home in San Marino, California. In trial, Suárez was convicted in Los Angeles with over 30 different charges on narcotics and drug trafficking, with 27 over charges related to money laundering, bank fraud, tax evasion and illegal exportation of monetary currency, to which he faced a life sentence in prison. In December 1990, U.S. District Judge Stephen V. Wilson sentenced Suárez to 30 years in prison, while his sister, Beatriz Asunta "Chunty" Roca was sentenced to five years' imprisonment for money laundering. He gave his first interview to the press on May 22, 2016. In the interview, Suárez has received political and criminal law diplomas after taking courses in prison. His family fortune and property in Santa Cruz has been seized.

== Release and second arrest ==
In April 2018, a federal judge ordered Suárez's early release, and he has since returned to Bolivia. Upon arriving in La Paz, Suárez was arrested and ordered to serve 15 years on criminal charges. In December, Suárez was given a ten-day pass to a clinic for an unspecified ailment under police supervision. Suárez escaped the clinic on the evening of December 8. In March of 2021, Suárez was rearrested in Lima, Peru and accused of shipping drugs from his home country Bolivia as well as Peru. He was sentenced to 30 years in prison.

== See also ==
- Illegal drug trade in Bolivia
