= Garras International Antinarcotics Training School =

The Garras International Antinarcotics Training School (Escuela Garras del Valor) is a military training facility located in Bolivia, which trains military and law enforcement personnel from Bolivia and other Latin American countries in counternarcotics, intelligence, and counterinsurgency techniques.

== See also ==
- Plan Colombia
- War on drugs
- School of the Americas
