= Narcotics in Bolivia =

Narcotics in Bolivia, South America, is a subject that primarily involves the coca crop, used in the production of the drug, cocaine. Trafficking and corruption have been two of the most prominent negative side-effects of the illicit narcotics trade in Bolivia and the country's government has engaged in negotiations with the United States (US) as result of the industry's ramifications.

== Coca ==
Bolivia's most lucrative crop and economic activity in the 1980s was coca, whose leaves were processed clandestinely into cocaine. The country was the second largest grower of coca in the world, supplying approximately fifteen percent of the US cocaine market in the late 1980s. Analysts believed that exports of coca paste and cocaine generated between US$600 million and US$1 billion annually in the 1980s (depending on prices and output). Based on these estimates, coca-related exports equaled or surpassed the country's legal exports.

Coca has been grown in Bolivia for centuries. The coca plant, a tea-like shrub, was cultivated mostly by small farmers in the Chapare and Yungas regions. About 65 percent of all Bolivian coca was grown in the Chapare region of Cochabamba Department; other significant coca-growing areas consisted of the Yungas of La Paz Department and various areas Santa Cruz and Tarija departments. Bolivian farmers rushed to grow coca in the 1980s as its price climbed and the economy collapsed. Soaring unemployment also contributed to the boom. In addition, farmers turned to coca for its quick economic return, its light weight, its yield of four crops a year, and the abundance of United States dollars available in the trade, a valuable resource in a hyperinflated economy. The Bolivian government estimated that coca production had expanded from 1.63 million kilograms of leaves covering 4,100 hectares in 1977 to a minimum of 45 million kilograms over an area of at least 48,000 hectares in 1987. The number of growers expanded from 7,600 to at least 40,000 over the same period. Besides growers, the coca networks employed numerous Bolivians, including carriers (zepeadores), manufacturers of coca paste and cocaine, security personnel, and a large variety of other positions. The unparalleled revenues made the risk worthwhile for many.

Government efforts to eradicate the expansion of coca cultivation in Bolivia began in 1983, when Bolivia committed itself to a five-year program to reduce coca production and created the Coca Eradication Directorate (Dirección de la Reconversión de la Coca—Direco) under the Ministry of Agriculture, Campesino Affairs, and Livestock Affairs. Bolivia's National Directorate for the Control of Dangerous Substances (Dirección Nacional para el Control de Substancias Peligrosas—DNCSP) was able to eradicate several thousand hectares of coca.

These efforts put only a small dent in the coca industry and were highly controversial among thousands of peasants. Under the joint agreement signed by the United States and Bolivia in 1987, which created the DNCSP, Bolivia allocated US$72.2 million for the 1988 to 1991 period to eradication programs, including a wide-ranging rural development program for the Chapare region. The program was aided by an 88 percent drop in the local price of coca caused by the fall in cocaine prices in the United States.

The economics of eradication were particularly frustrating. As more coca was destroyed, the local price increased, making it more attractive to other growers. Bolivia, however, was seeking additional funds from the United States and Western Europe to proceed with an eradication plan that was supposed to provide peasants US$2,000 per hectare eradicated. With the 1988 passage of Law 1008, coca growing became technically illegal outside a specially mandated 12,000- hectare area in the Yungas.

A four-year government eradication campaign begun in 1989 sought to convert 55 percent of coca areas into legal crops. Coffee and citrus fruits were offered as alternative crops to coca despite the fact that their return was a fraction of that of coca. These crops were also harder to sell and transport. Coca has a much longer shelf-life than that of fruit crops, which require rapid transportation.

The cocaine industry had a generally deleterious effect on the Bolivian economy. The cocaine trade greatly accelerated the predominance of the United States dollar in the economy and the large black market for currency, thereby helping to fuel inflation in the 1980s. The escalation of coca cultivation also damaged the output of fruits and coffee, which were mostly destined for local consumption. Coca's high prices, besides being generally inflationary, also distorted other sectors, especially labor markets. Manufacturers in the Cochabamba area during the 1980s found it impossible to match the wages workers could gain in coca, making their supply of labor unreliable and thus hurting the formal economy.

In an example of the balloon effect, dramatic falls in coca cultivation in the late 1990s saw some cultivation move to Colombia.

== Narcotics trafficking ==
By the late 1980s, Bolivians had become increasingly aware of the serious threat to their society posed by drug traffickers. One Bolivian editorial identified several dimensions of that threat: the existence of hundreds of clandestine airstrips in eastern Bolivia; flights of unidentified aircraft in Bolivian airspace; the presence of armed criminal groups; the disappearance of, and trafficking in, Bolivian passports; the intervention of officials of foreign governments in Bolivia's affairs; the acceptance of foreign troops on Bolivian territory; corruption within the national security agencies and courts of justice; the growing control of mass media by narcotics traffickers; the spread of drug abuse among Bolivian youth; and the increased links between traffickers and guerrilla groups.

== Narcoterrorism ==
An unwanted by-product of Bolivia's cocaine industry was the importation of Colombian-style drug violence. In the late 1980s, Colombia's Medellín Cartel reportedly wielded considerable power in Bolivia, setting prices for coca paste and cocaine and terrorizing the drug underworld with hired assassins. Furthermore, drug barons, organized into families, had established their own fiefdoms in Cochabamba, Beni, and Santa Cruz departments, using bribes and assassinations to destroy local authority.

In September 1986, three members of a Bolivian scientific team were slain in the Huanchaca National Park in Santa Cruz Department shortly after their aircraft landed beside a clandestine coca-paste factory. The murders led to the discovery of the country's largest cocaine-processing installation, as well as evidence of an extensive international drug-trafficking organization consisting mostly of Colombians and Brazilians. President Paz Estenssoro fired the Bolivian police commander and deputy commander as a result of their alleged involvement. In a related action, suspected traffickers in Santa Cruz murdered an opposition deputy who was a member of the congressional commission that investigated the Huanchaca case.

In the late 1980s, there were several incidents of narcoterrorism against the United States presence, the judiciary, and antidrug agents. For example, the so-called Alejo Calatayu terrorist command claimed responsibility for a May 1987 bomb attack against the Cochabamba home of a DEA agent. The supreme court of justice, seated in Sucre, requested and received military police protection in mid-1986. The explosives brigade successfully removed a live briefcase-bomb from the senate library in August 1987.

The so-called Santa Cruz Cartel, allegedly linked to the Medellín Cartel in Colombia, claimed responsibility for the machine-gun murders of two members of the special antinarcotics force in Santa Cruz in March 1988. Bolivians were also concerned about the increasing brazenness of Bolivia's drug traffickers, as demonstrated in August 1988 by a low-power dynamite attack on Secretary of State George P. Shultz's car caravan as it headed to La Paz's Kennedy International Airport. The so-called Simón Bolívar Group and the Pablo Zárate Willka National Indigenous Force (Fuerza Indigenista Pablo Zárate Willka—FIPZW) claimed responsibility.

== Narcotics corruption ==
Drug-related corruption reportedly began to take a firm hold within Bolivia's military and security services under General Banzer's rule (1971–78). In 1980 the Junta of Commanders headed by Luis García Meza Tejada forced a violent coup d'etat—sometimes referred to as the Cocaine Coup - on 17 July. The García Meza regime (1980–81) was one of Bolivia's most flagrant examples of narcotics corruption. García Meza's so-called cocaine coup was itself generally believed to have been financed by the cocaine "mafia," which bribed certain military officers. García Meza reportedly ruled with an "inner cabinet" of leading civilians and military officers involved in the cocaine trade. Two of his ministers—Colonel Ariel Coca and Colonel Luis Arce Gómez—were well-known "godfathers" of the industry. By 1982 approximately 4,500 prosecutions were under way in connection with the embezzlement of state funds by civil servants, said to amount to a total of US$100 million. Garcia Meza's rule was so violent, and his regime so internationally isolated due to his drug trafficking, that he was forced to resign in 1981. His main collaborator, Colonel Luis Arce Gómez, was extradited to the United States, where he served a jail sentence for drug trafficking.

In early 1986, Congress charged García Meza and fifty-five of his former colleagues with sedition, armed uprising, treason, genocide, murder, torture, fraud against the state, drug trafficking, crimes against the Constitution, and other crimes. In April 1986, however, the Supreme Court of Justice suspended the first hearing in García Meza's murder trial, after his defense demanded the removal of three judges whom it charged had participated in García Meza's military government.

The Supreme Court of Justice subsequently voted to remove its president and two other justices from the trial. After García Meza escaped from custody (he had been living under house arrest in Sucre) and reportedly fled the country in early 1989, the Supreme Court of Justice vowed to try him and two accomplices in absentia. Governmental and military/police corruption under the Paz Estenssoro government (1985–89) was less flagrant than in the 1980-82 period of military rule. Nevertheless, it reportedly remained widespread.

In December 1988, Bolivia's foreign minister asserted that narcotics traffickers were attempting to corrupt the political process. Bolivians were outraged, for example, by secretly taped "narcovideos" made in 1985 by Roberto Suárez Gómez (known as the "King of Cocaine" in Bolivia until the mid-1980s) and aired on national television in May 1988. The tapes, provided by a former naval captain cashiered for alleged corruption, showed two prominent politicians from Banzer's Nationalist Democratic Action (Acción Democrática Nacionalista—ADN) and military figures fraternizing with Suárez.

The UMOPAR in particular had earned a reputation for corruption, especially in the Chapare region. In 1987, according to Department of State and congressional staff, drug traffickers were offering UMOPAR officers and town officials in the Chapare region amounts ranging from US$15,000 to US$25,000 for seventy two hours of "protection" in order to allow aircraft to load and take off from clandestine airstrips. In February 1988, the deputy minister of national defense announced that about 90 percent of UMOPAR members, including twelve middle- and high-ranking officers, had been dismissed for alleged links to drug trafficking. The La Paz newspaper Presencia reported in March 1988 that UMOPAR chiefs, including the prosecutors, were working with narcotics traffickers by returning to them the large drug finds and turning only the small ones in to the authorities. Observers considered UMOPAR forces in Santa Cruz to be more honest and dedicated.

In October 1988, the undersecretary of the Social Defense Secretariat reiterated that drug traffickers had obtained the protection of important sectors of influence in Bolivia, including some military members and ordinary judges. He cited the example of Cochabamba's Seventh Division commander and four of his top officers, who were discharged dishonorably after they were found to be protecting a clandestine Chapare airstrip used by drug smugglers. The ministry official also announced that the navy was protecting drug-trafficking activities in the Puerto Villarroel area of the Chapare. For that reason, the United States suspended assistance to the navy temporarily in late 1988 until its commander was replaced. In December 1989, Bolivia's antidrug police captured no less a drug trafficker than Arce Gómez, who was subsequently extradited to the United States.

== Impact of narcotics trafficking ==
In the late 1980s, there continued to be concern about an overburdened and allegedly corrupt judicial system. According to the Department of State's Country Reports on Human Rights Practices for 1988 and Bolivian press reports, judges were implicated in drug-related corruption. Narcotics traffickers routinely tried to bribe judicial and other officials in exchange for releasing suspected smugglers, returning captured drugs, and purging incriminating files. In 1988 the Senate's Constitution and Justice Committee ordered the suspension of thirteen judges of the La Paz, Cochabamba, and Santa Cruz superior district courts of justice for wrongdoing in drug-trafficking cases. The Supreme Court of Justice insisted, however, on its prerogative to try the judges first. After doing so, it ordered the suspension of several of the accused judges and continued to investigate others.

Relatively few prosecutions or forfeitures of traffickers' assets took place. A lack of judicial investigatory power hampered the investigation of the bank accounts and the origin of wealth of people suspected of trafficking in drugs. Although thirteen of the "big bosses" reportedly had been identified by early 1988, arrests of drug kingpins were infrequently reported because of lack of evidence.

In ruling on the 1986 Huanchaca case involving the slaying of a leading Bolivian scientist, his pilot, and a guide, the Third Criminal Court of Santa Cruz returned a guilty verdict in April 1988 against ten Brazilians and a Colombian, in addition to a Bolivian thought to be dead. The court, however, dismissed charges against five other Bolivian suspects, including several well-known drug traffickers. The freeing of two of the suspects by the Santa Cruz judges prompted the Supreme Court of Justice to demand the resignations of the entire Santa Cruz judiciary because of its leniency toward drug traffickers. Four Santa Cruz judges were dismissed because of irregularities in the Huanchaca case, which in early 1989 remained at an impasse, under advisement in the Supreme Court of Justice.

Drug kingpin Roberto Suárez Gómez was arrested in 1988.

Under the 1988 Antinarcotics Law, the Judicial Police must report antinarcotics operations to the closest Special Antinarcotics Force district within forty-eight hours. The law also called for the creation of three-judge Special NarcoticsControl Courts or tribunals (Juzgados Especiales de Narcotráfico) with broad responsibilities. In early 1989, the Supreme Court of Justice began appointing judges and lawyers to serve on the new tribunals, two of which began functioning as tribunals of first instance in narcotics-related cases, with jurisdiction for the judicial districts of La Paz, Cochabamba, Santa Cruz, and Beni.

A total of thirteen Special Narcotics-Control Courts were supposed to be operating by mid-1989, with two in each of the districts of La Paz, Cochabamba, Santa Cruz, and Beni, and only one responsible for the five remaining departments. Their judges, adjunct prosecutors, and support staff were to receive higher salaries than other judicial officials. However, the Paz Zamora government reportedly planned to disband these courts.

== Bilateral and legislative anti-narcotics measures ==
In February 1987, Bolivia and the United States signed a broad outline of an agreement on a three-year, US$300 million joint plan aimed at eradicating 70 percent of Bolivia's known coca fields. The new program included a one-year voluntary eradication phase and a program in which coca growers would be paid US$350 in labor costs and US$1,650 in longer-term development assistance for each hectare of coca destroyed. According to the Department of State's Bureau of International Narcotics Matters, Bolivia exceeded the voluntary coca reduction target for the September 1987 to August 1988 period, destroying 2,000 hectares, or 200 more than required.

To implement the 1987 agreement, the Paz Estenssoro government revamped the antidrug bureaucracy that had been established, incongruously, in 1981 during the García Meza regime. The National Council Against the Unlawful Use and Illicit Trafficking of Drugs (Consejo Nacional Contra el Uso Indebido y Tráfico Ilícito de Drogas—Conalid), presided over by the foreign minister, was charged with drawing up rules and regulations and creating new antidrug-trafficking measures.

Two new secretariats were formed under Conalid. The Social Defense Subsecretariat (Subsecretaría de Defensa Social) was made subordinate to the Ministry of Interior, Migration, and Justice and charged with interdiction. It also centralized all the activities of the National Directorate for the Control of Dangerous Substances (Dirección Nacional para el Control de Substancias Peligrosas—DNCSP) and of the Umopar. The Subsecretariat of Alternative Development and Substitution of Coca Cultivation (Subsecretaría de Desarrollo Alternativo y Sustitución de Cultivos de Coca) and its Coca Eradication Directorate (Dirección de la Reconversión de la Coca—Direco) were charged with drawing up overall rural development plans for the areas affected by the substitution of the coca plantations.

On July 19, 1988, to qualify for United States aid, Paz Estenssoro signed the Law of Regulations for Coca and Controlled Substances (Ley del Régimen de la Coca y Sustancias Controladas)- -hereafter, the 1988 Antinarcotics Law. One of the strictest antinarcotics laws in Latin America, it aimed at eradicating illicit coca production and penalizing trafficking in drugs. As enacted by presidential decree in December 1988, the new law provided for a 10,000-hectare zone of legal coca cultivation in the Yungas region of La Paz Department and a small section of Cochabamba Department to meet traditional demand (down from a previous total of 80,000 hectares for the Yungas and Chapare regions).

It also provided for a transitional zone of excess production in the Chapare region subject to annual reduction bench marks of 5,000 to 8,000 hectares and provided for an illegal zone, comprising all territory outside the traditional and transitional areas, in which coca cultivation was prohibited. The law prohibited the use of chemicals or herbicides for the eradication of coca, established that some 48,000 hectares of coca plantations would be eradicated over a five-year period, and set up a special judicial mechanism to deal with illegal drug trafficking.

Under the 1988 Antinarcotics Law, drug traffickers could be sentenced to prison for anywhere between five and twenty-five years; manufacturers of controlled substances, five to fifteen years; sowers and harvesters of illicit coca fields, two to four years; transporters, eight to twelve years; and pisadores (coca stompers), one to two years. Minors under the age of sixteen who were found guilty of drug-related crimes would be sent to special centers until they were completely rehabilitated.

Shortly before the new law went into effect, a United States General Accounting Office report criticized Bolivia's methods of fighting drug trafficking. The study, whose undocumented generalizations about corruption reportedly irked Bolivian government officials, put the primary blame for the slow progress against drug trafficking on rampant corruption in Bolivia and "the unwillingness or inability of the government of Bolivia to introduce and implement effective coca control and enforcement measures".

In rejecting the report, the minister of interior, migration, and justice noted in November 1988 that, in addition to arresting more than 1,000 individuals on drug charges, Bolivia had eradicated some 2,750 hectares of coca plantations, seized 22,500 kilograms of cocaine, and destroyed over 2,000 cocaine factories. Bolivian officials also asserted that more than 1,660 antidrug operations during 1988 had resulted in the destruction of from 1,000 to 1,400 clandestine cocaine factories and laboratories (80 percent of them in Cochabamba and Santa Cruz departments), the confiscation of about 10,000 kilograms of cocaine, and the arrest of some 700 individuals. The minister of planning and coordination stated in December that 2,900 hectares of coca crops had been eradicated under the financial compensation program.

Bolivia's anti-narcotics units apprehended several prominent traffickers in 1988. At the same time that the 1988 Antinarcotics Law was promulgated, the Umopar arrested Suárez at his hacienda in Beni Department. According to one theory, Suárez allowed himself to be arrested in a bid to avoid extradition to the United States. In October 1988, the Special Antinarcotics Forces captured an alleged drug "godfather," Mario Araoz Morales ("El Chichin"), by chance during a training exercise in a jungle area. In November antidrug police in the Chapare also arrested Rosa Flores de Cabrera, alias Rosa Romero de Humérez ("La Chola Rosa"), described as one of the most-wanted women in the Bolivian drugtrafficking network, with connections to the Medellín Cartel.

In 1991, under pressure from the United States, Bolivia involved its military forces in anti-drugs actions, despite local opposition.

Under the government of Jaime Paz Zamora (1989-1993), antidrug institutions were restructured, but Conalid remained the regulatory body. Conalid directed the Permanent Executive Coordination and Operations Council (Consejo Permanente de Coordinación Ejecutiva y Operativa—Copceo). Like Conalid, Copceo was headed by the foreign minister, and its membership also included the ministers of interior, migration, and justice; planning and coordination; social services and public health; agriculture, campesino affairs, and livestock affairs; education and culture; national defense; and finance. A new National Executive Directorate (Directorio Ejecutivo Nacional—DEN) was to support Copceo's plans and program dealing with alternative development, drug prevention, and coca-crop eradication.

== Plan Dignidad ==
In 1995 at the height of coca production, one out of every eight Bolivians made a living from coca. The country was the world's third largest grower of coca after Peru and Colombia.

In 1997, 458 square kilometres of land were being used to produce coca leaves, with only 120 km^{2} of that being grown for the licit market. In August 1997, with strong support of the US government, Bolivian President Hugo Banzer developed "Plan Dignidad" ("The Dignity Plan") to counter the drug trade. The plan focused on eradication, interdiction (through lab destruction), efforts to counter money laundering, and implementation of social programs that countered and prevented drug addiction.

The plan's heavy emphasis on plant eradication and noticeable lack of focus on trafficking organizations was noted by its critics at the time. The US Embassy in Bolivia defended the aggressive focus on crops, maintaining that Bolivia was devoid of significant trafficking organizations and claiming that the bulk of illegally exported coca went through small ‘mom-and-pop’ operations.

This claim continues to be rejected by scholars of Bolivian society who say "Bolivia is very vulnerable to the influence of international trafficking organizations and that it is very likely that the participation of Bolivian entrepreneurs in the illegal business has increased." During the initial years of the operation area of coca production dropped. While in 1997 it had been 458 km^{2}, by 1998 it was down to 380 km^{2}; in 1999 it fell to 218 km^{2}, and in 2000 it reached its lowest point at 146 km^{2}. Since the 1990s, the US has been funding the Bolivian government's eradication program by an average of $150 million a year.

== Evo Morales ==
In 2008, President Evo Morales gave the Drug Enforcement Administration (DEA) three months to leave the country, accusing them of fomenting the drug trade rather than fighting it.

President Morales continued to maintain relations with the US government, including on counter-narcotics issues. Such relations appeared to have been strengthened by the Morales administration's success in reducing coca cultivation. Its strategy was based on the voluntary participation of farmers from all coca-growing regions in the country. For instance, farmers in Chapare are allowed to grow one cato (1,600 square meters) of coca per year, as part of policy formally introduced in Bolivia in 2004. Any coca grown beyond that limit, or any cultivation outside of approved coca-cultivation regions such as Chapare, is subject to elimination. The strategy relies on coca growers federations’ ability to enforce the agreement. Such federations are influential, and penalties for violations by farmers or lax enforcement by federations can be stern (including seizure of lands). As a result, coca cultivation in Bolivia fell to 27,200 hectares in 2011 from 31,000 hectares in 2010 - a 12 percent decrease.

Former President of Bolivia Evo Morales is also titular president of Bolivia's cocalero movement – a loose federation of coca growers' unions, made up of campesinos who are resisting the efforts of the United States government to eradicate coca in the province of Chapare in central Bolivia.

Seizures of coca paste and cocaine and destruction of drug laboratories had steadily increased since President Morales took office, and coca cultivation was down 13% in 2011 alone. Analysts such as Kathryn Ledebur and Colletta Youngers indicate that these successes had emerged from effective coca monitoring, increased economic development, and "social control". Such improvements in Bolivia's narcotics situation had reportedly drawn attention and led to a slight diplomatic thaw with the United States; the two countries are expected to swap ambassadors.

== See also ==
- UMOPAR
- Coca in Bolivia
- Crime in Bolivia

== Works cited ==
- Hudson, Rex A.; Hanratty, Dennis Michael, eds. (1991). Bolivia: a country study. Washington, D.C.: Federal Research Division, Library of Congress. This article incorporates text from this source, which is in the public domain.
