= Río Hondo, Zacapa =

Municipality in Guatemala

Coordinates: 15°2′46.85″N 89°35′4.48″W

Río Hondo is a municipality in the Guatemalan department of Zacapa.

Rio Hondo, Which means "Deep River" in the English language, is known for its crystal clear river.

Rio Hondo is mainly made up of farmlands; the likes of which include mango groves, lime groves, avocado groves, cattle, and tilapia farms.

The pueblo of Llano Verde is home to Esperanza de Vida, a large Christian humanitarian organization. Under the direction of Carlos Vargas, the Esperanza de Vida campus includes a retirement home, a nutrition center, an orphanage, a private K-12 school (Liberty College), a missions house, and St. Luke's Hospital. These centers are open to the community.

Calle 9 or Road 9 (Called "La Ruta" or "The Route" by the locals) is a major road that goes through Rio Hondo. It comes from Guatemala City and ends end Puerto Barrios.
