= Michael Levine (DEA) =

US law enforcement agent

Michael Levine (born December 20, 1939) is a former senior United States law enforcement agent, who was called "America's top undercover cop for 25 years" by the television show 60 Minutes. A 25-year veteran of the U.S. Drug Enforcement Administration (DEA), he is best known for his criticism of the U.S. Central Intelligence Agency (CIA) and the influence it has played on DEA operations. Levine has claimed the CIA was instrumental in the creation of the Bolivian drug cartel La Corporación, which he called the "General Motors of cocaine".

== Career ==
Levine has testified as an expert witness in 500 civil and criminal trials in the US and abroad, and has lectured on Undercover Operations and Human Intelligence for the U.S. Defense Intelligence Agency, the U.S. Federal Bureau of Investigation's advanced undercover seminar, the New York State Division of Criminal Justice Services and the Royal Canadian Mounted Police.

Levine's career as an undercover agent first became public with the publication of his DEA-authorized biography in March 1988, Undercover.

In March 1988, Levine wrote a letter to the New York Daily News about how he wanted to arrest Howard Stern after Stern had been joking on the radio about drugs being used backstage before his pay-per-view show Howard Stern's Negligeé and Underpants Party. Special Agent in Charge for the New York City office of the DEA Robert Stutman denied any investigation into Stern and said "Levine's letter was written without the agency's knowledge." However, in Levine's follow-up book Deep Cover, Levine claimed that the letter to Daily News as well as the Stern investigation had not only been authorized by DEA and the Department of Justice, but that Stern's media clout had caused the DEA to back down from the investigation.

Also in Deep Cover, Levine claimed that Edwin Meese, the then United States Attorney General, had unmasked a DEA undercover team, posing as a Mafia family, that had penetrated the office of the President of Mexico and was "buying" Mexican military protection for the transportation of 15 tons of cocaine through Mexico into the United States.

In May 2011, Evo Morales, the President of Bolivia, held up Levine's book La Guerra Falsa for the press to photograph, citing it as justification for his expelling the DEA from Bolivia on what he said was the basis of DEA using the war on drugs to manipulate the Bolivian government. La Guerra Falsa, was the Spanish translation of Levine's The Big White Lie. Levine replied in several articles that, "if President Morales had read the book he would have welcomed DEA as heroes and booted CIA from his country for betraying both the Bolivian and American people".

Since 1995 he has co-hosted The Expert Witness Radio Show with musician Mark Marshall on the Pacifica Radio Network station WBAI-FM in New York.

On August 11 2008, Levine was featured on The Colbert Report in a segment entitled "Nailed 'Em," which pokes fun at the American justice system for law enforcement activity that some would consider trivial or frivolous. The episode focused on a medical marijuana patient who was denied a job for failing a drug test.

Levine has also been featured as an expert commentator on Dateline NBC, The MacNeil/Lehrer NewsHour, Inside Edition, 60 Minutes, Crier Report, The Geraldo Rivera Show, Crossfire, Good Morning America, NBC and CBS morning shows, Cold Blood, The Big Idea with Donny Deutsch, Charlie Rose, Bill Moyers' Project Censored, and Contrapunto (Crossfire's Spanish language version).

== Bibliography ==
- The Big White Lie: The Deep Cover Operation That Exposed the CIA Sabotage of the Drug War. ISBN 1-56025-084-4; ISBN 978-1-56025-084-5
- Deep Cover: The Inside Story of How DEA Infighting, Incompetence and Subterfuge Lost Us the Biggest Battle of the Drug War. ISBN 0-595-09264-0; ISBN 978-0-595-09264-2
- Fight Back; How to Take Back Your Neighborhood, Schools And Families From the Drug Dealer. ISBN 978-0-595-41834-3; ISBN 0-595-41834-1

=== Fiction-based works ===
- Triangle of Death. ISBN 0-440-22367-9
- Technical consultant to the NBC miniseries Kingpin
- Actor and technical consultant to the Showtime series (cable TV series) Street Time
