= Bolivian National Police =

Bolivian National Police Corps Cuerpo de Policía Nacional
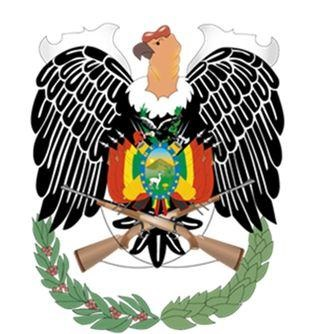
- Abbreviation: CdPN

Agency overview
- Formed: 1886
- Employees: 40,000 (2019 est.)

Jurisdictional structure
- Operations jurisdiction: Bolivia
- General nature: Civilian police

Operational structure
- Headquarters: La Paz
- Sworn members: 40,000 carabineros and agentes (2022 est.)
- Agency executive: Gral. Rodolfo Montero (2020), Comandante General de la Policia Boliviana

Facilities
- Stations: 9 major

Website
- Official website

The Bolivian National Police Corps (Spanish: Cuerpo de Policía Nacional) is responsible for internal security and maintaining law and order. Unlike many South American countries, the Bolivian police force always has been accountable to the national government rather than to state or local officials. The 1950 Organic Law of Police and Carabiniers officially separated the police from the military. Frequently, however, the national police call upon the military for assistance in quelling riots and civil protests.

The countrywide emergency number for the police, including the highway patrol, is 110.

== Historical background ==
Although the Marshal of Ayacucho, Antonio José de Sucre, had organized the first Bolivian police force on June 24, 1826, the National Police (Policía Nacional) was not established officially until 1886. The Bolivian police became institutionalized on the national level in 1937 with the creation of the National Corps of Carabineers (Cuerpo Nacional de Carabineros) and its professional training school, the Police School (Escuela de Policía), later renamed the National Police Academy (Academia Nacional de Policías). The carabineers constituted a post-Chaco War merger of the military police, the Gendarmerie Corps (Cuerpo de Gendarmería), the paramilitary Security Police (Policía de Seguridad) and the Army's Carabineer Regiment (Regimiento de Carabineros).

Bolivia's police forces had always been responsible to the national government rather than to lesser political authorities. The concept of centralized police power is established by the Constitution. The Police Law of 1886 formalized the system that remained in effect throughout the first half of the twentieth century. In 1950 the Organic Law of Police and Carabineers of Bolivia (Law No. 311) revised the police system substantially. Law No. 311 and the 1886 law provide the legal basis for the present-day police system.

Before the 1952 revolution, the police corps was subordinate to the army and to the Ministry of National Defense. The army assumed most police functions and treated the corps as a reserve to be called on only in times of dire emergency. As a result of its active support of the revolution, however, the national police received greater jurisdiction over police affairs and was modernized. It and the carabineers were transferred to the jurisdiction of what was then the Ministry of Interior, which concerned itself exclusively with administrative supervision. Nevertheless, the police resented being commanded by an army officer and having lower status and pay than the military.

== Mission ==
The constitutional mission of the national police is to preserve public order, protect society through its specialized agencies, and guarantee enforcement of the laws. The police are also responsible for protecting foreign diplomatic missions. The police do not deliberate or participate in partisan politics. The Constitution stipulates that the president of the republic is the commander in chief of the police forces. In this capacity, the president—acting through the minister of interior, migration, and justice—names the director general of the National Police Corps (Cuerpo de Policía Nacional), another name for the national police.

In a national emergency, the president is empowered to administer directly the activities of the police corps. During an international conflict, the police forces would be subordinate to the military commander-in-chief and the Ministry of National Defense. In that event, the Constitution requires that police activities be integrated with those of the army as though the police were reserve units called to active duty for the duration of hostilities. The director general, who may be a civilian but almost invariably has been a high-ranking career police officer (usually with colonel rank), normally exercises operational control.

== Organization ==
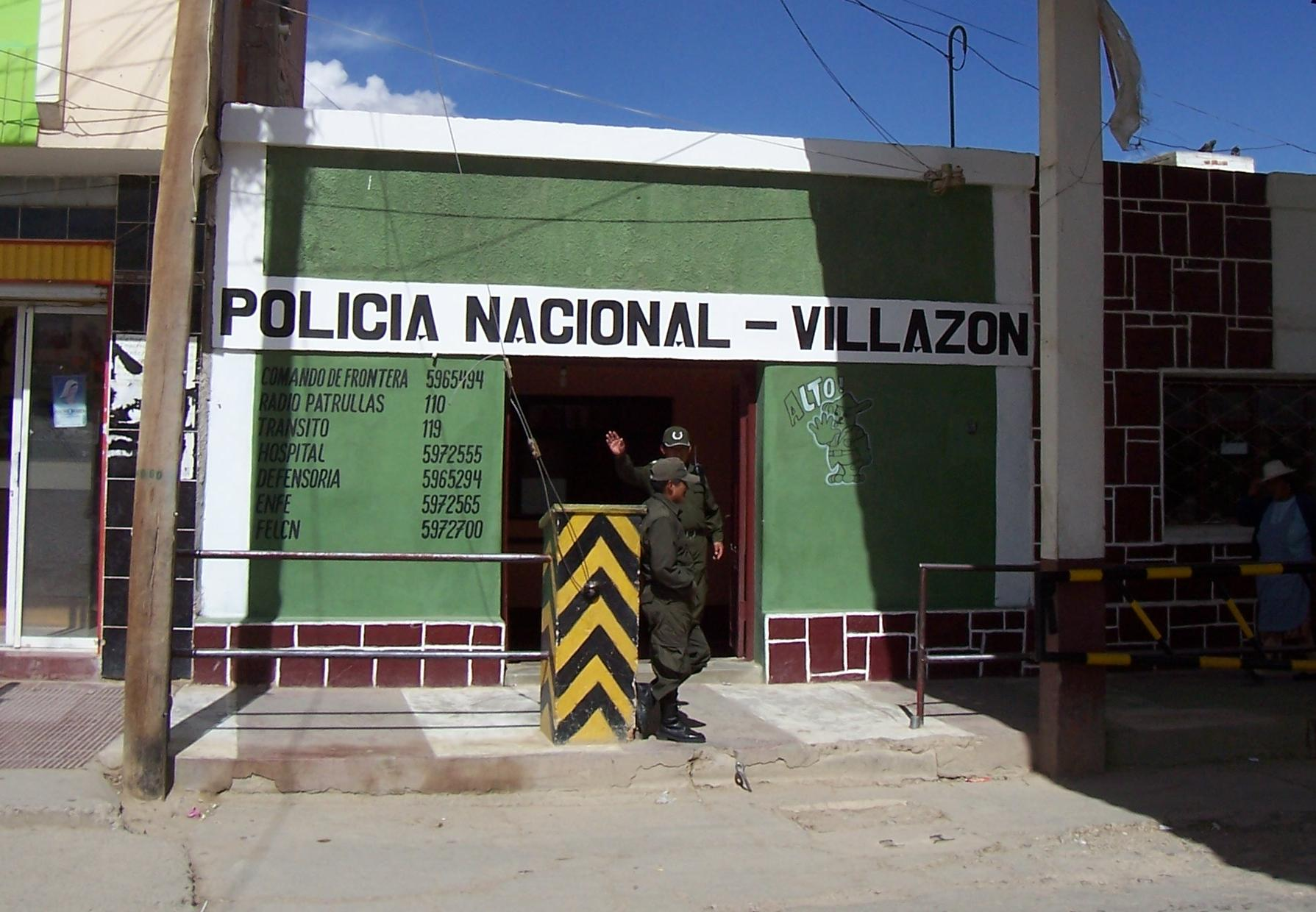
Policía Nacional in Villazón on the border with Argentina.

The police corps, with at least 40.000 personnel in the 2020s, consists of:

- The General Administration (Administración General) section.
- The 5,000-member paramilitary National Guard (Guardia Nacional), referred to as the carabiniers (Carabineros).
- The Directorate of National Investigations (Dirección de Investigaciones Nacionales, DIN), which cooperated with the International Police (Interpol).
- The Customs Police (Policía de Aduana).
- The Traffic Police (Policía de Tránsito).
- The National Highway Service (Servicio Nacional de Carreteras), which operated under the authority of the Ministry of Transport and Communications.
- The Fire Corps (Cuerpo de Bomberos), which is staffed by police personnel.
- The National Police Academy.

All of these subordinate entities were separate administrative units within the director general's office. This office, which also served as national headquarters for all police and national guard activities, consisted of a command group (the Police General Command), which was established in the early 1980s; and a staff (Estado Mayor) made up of twelve numbered, conventionally established staff sections.

=== Leadership ===
The National Police are led by a Commandant General, currently Colonel Ciro Oscar Farfán Medina, who was named in the wake of the René Sanabria affair and took office on 11 March 2011. His predecessor was General Oscar Nina who served from 24 January 2010 to this date.

=== Regional police organization ===
The National Police Corps is a centralized force, organized on a territorial basis. Each department of Bolivia has a police district subdivided into zones. Field elements of the National Police and National Guard were stationed in all sectors of the country and reported directly to the office of the director general in La Paz. Each department generally had one brigade (brigada) of carabineers, consisting of an urban and a rural force. Subordinate headquarters (also known as brigades), stationed in the capital of each of the nine departments, coordinated and supervised operations. Each brigade was divided into an urban command and a rural command. The urban command, at the departmental capital, operated the police stations and local jails and was also divided into patrol and criminal investigation sections.

Most corps personnel and units within a department were considered – regardless of their size, composition, mission or station – to be part of the brigade in the area they served and were members of a single departmental unit. An exception was the city of La Paz, where two separate regiments of carabineers were kept under the direct control of the director general and the president. Other exceptions to the integral brigade organization were made in sections of the country where dependence on the regular departmental brigade forces was not deemed advisable or feasible. Two such areas – San Ignacio de Velasco in Santa Cruz Department and Tupiza in Potosí Department – had independent carabineer detachments in addition to the department brigades.

Certain departmental brigade personnel of the rural command were assigned to a series of frontier posts scattered at twenty-seven critical points along the borders and at river and lake ports of entry. They included Customs Police integral to the corps, as well as uniformed carabineers concerned with combating smuggling and other forms of illegal border crossing. The carabineers were also heavily involved in civic action in the more remote and less populated regions of the country. In an effort to improve its public relations, the police created the Department of Social Communication (Departamento de Comunicación Social) in the early 1980s.

Corps personnel were classified in three distinct groups: uniformed personnel (carabineers); technical and auxiliary personnel; and civilian police investigators and identification personnel. Ranks of uniformed personnel generally corresponded to those of the army. There were four general classifications – jefes (field officers), oficiales (company officers), clases (NCOs) tropas (privates) – with a graded system of rank within each class. Uniformed personnel were promoted on the basis of annual examinations given when they attained the required time in grade, which was usually four years for all except captains and sergeants, who must spend five years in grade before becoming eligible for promotion. Classification of civilians was based on a nonmilitary two-category system composed of superiors (funcionarios superiores) and subalterns (funcionarios subalternos).

In the mid-1980s, approximately 80 percent of the National Police Corps were uniformed carabineers. The remaining 20 percent were civilian police investigators involved in crime detection, forensic science, administration, or logistics. Approximately half of the total uniformed personnel and 60 percent of the nonuniformed personnel of the police force were stationed in La Paz. The La Paz Departmental Police also had an Explosives Brigade (Brigada de Explosivos), which was subordinate to the Fire Corps. The 600-member Traffic Police administered traffic law. Only officers of this force normally carried sidearms. All motorcycle patrolmen were commissioned officers. The Feminine Police Brigade (Brigada Policial Femenina) served in an auxiliary or support capacity to the operational units. In addition to directing traffic, members of this brigade helped in police matters involving children and women.

=== Municipal police ===
All municipalities were entitled to raise local police forces to enforce local ordinances. Only La Paz, however, had established such a force, called the La Paz Municipal Police (Policía Municipal de La Paz). In the mid-1980s, this force numbered about 400 uniformed and 100 nonuniformed members, none of whom was armed. Their functions were limited to enforcing parking regulations and local bylaws.

Most of the city of La Paz was under the jurisdiction of Police District No. 2, which consisted of five squadrons. Police District No. 3 was responsible for the sprawling shantytowns above the city known generally as El Alto. Police Regiment No. 4 exercised jurisdiction over the area south of La Paz.

== Special police forces ==
Other police forces under the Ministry of Interior, Migration, and Justice included antiriot, antinarcotics, and antiterrorist units.

=== Special Security Group ===
The Special Security Group (Grupo Especial de Seguridad, GES) was an operational, technical, and specialized unit. Its approximately 450 members were organized into motorcycle companies. They were mobilized to reestablish public order or to respond to an attack against private property. Normally, they served in the Legislative Palace; Ministry of Interior, Migration, and Justice; and other public institutions; or in the national police's National Guard and DIN.

The GES also assumed counterterrorist functions. In March 1987, French police advisers and Bolivian experts began giving a three-month antiterrorism course – consisting of technical and psychological training – to 400 GES members. The purpose of the training was to form a special group for responding to hostage taking incidents. That June the Bolivian police announced officially the creation of a twenty-two-member antiterrorist command, the Multipurpose Intervention Brigade (Brigada de Intervención Polivalente, BIP), responsible for solving cases of "uncommon violence" such as kidnapping, hostage-taking, and outbreaks of subversion.

=== Elite Antiterrorist Force ===
The government of President Jaime Paz Zamora gave responsibility for anti-terrorist actions to the Elite Anti-terrorist Special Force (Fuerza Especial Antiterrorista de Elite, FEAE).

=== Special Antinarcotics Force ===
The narcotics police, with about 6,000 members as of the late 1980s, included the Special Antinarcotics Force (Fuerza Especial de Lucha Contra el Narcotráfico, FELCN) created in 1987, and a subordinate force, the Mobile Police Unit for Rural Areas (Unidad Móvil Policial para reas Rurales, Umopar). The Umopar, popularly known as "The Leopards" (Los Leopardos), was formed in late 1983 under a United States-funded program designed to eradicate the nation's cocaine trade and in accordance with four treaties on narcotics, signed by both countries on August 11, 1983. By early 1989, FELCN had its own intelligence service, which was charged with collecting evidence on individuals suspected of narcotics trafficking.

=== Tourism Police ===
The National Tourism Police has offices in La Paz and Cochabamba with plans to expand to Santa Cruz, providing free assistance to tourists.

== Units ==
=== Especializadas (Specialties) ===
Native name	(Abbreviation,) English
Dirección Nacional de Identificación Personal	DNIP, National Directorate for Personal Identification
Fuerza Especial de Lucha Contra el Crimen	FELCC, Special Force to Combat and Control Crime
Fuerza Especial de Lucha Contra el Narcotráfico	FELCN, Special Force to Combat and Control Narcotics Trafficking
Control Operativo Aduanero	COA, Customs
Dirección Nacional de Prevención e Investigación de Robo de Vehículos	DIPROVE, National Directorate of Prevention and Investigation of Vehicle Theft
Unidad de Seguridad para la Asamblea Constituyente	USPAC, Security Unit for the Constituent Assembly
Brigada De Protección a la Familia	Family Protection Brigade
Oficinas de Conciliación Ciudadana	Office of Citizen Conciliation
Policía Forestal y Medio Ambiente	POFOMA, Forestry and Environmental Police
Escuadrón de Seguridad – Los Pumas	Security Squadron - The Cougars
Unidad de Protección de Dignatarios	USEDI, VIP Protection Unit
Grupo Especial	DELTAI, Special Forces Group

=== Unidades de orden y seguridad (Security and public order units) ===
Native name	English
Distritos Policiales de Patrullaje a Pie	Foot patrols by district police
Radio Patrulla	radio-based patrols
Patrulla de Auxilio y Cooperación Ciudadana	Auxiliary and Citizen Cooperation Patrol
Unidad de Seguridad Ciudadana Polivalentes	Multipurpose Public Safety Unit
Organismo Operativo del Tránsito	Transport security
Unidad Operativa de Bomberos Antofagasta	La Paz Fire Rescue Brigade
Unidad Centro de Adiestramiento de Canes	Canine Training Center
Unidad Táctica de Operaciones Policiales	Police Operations and Tactics Unit
Policía Rural y Fronteriza	Rural and Border Police
Policía Montada	Mounted Police
Patrulla Caminera	Vehicle Patrol

== Prison system ==
Prisons in Bolivia are guarded by police officers rather than a civilian force as in many western countries. Funding for the prison system is low and as a result the police only patrol the perimeter of the prisons; internal security is generally managed by the inmates. In most large Bolivian prisons the inmates elect 'delegados' or heads of departments, for example education, discipline, workshops, etc. to maintain order. Due to the lack of funding, inmates have to buy or rent their cell space and pay for meals; hence the majority of prisoners have to undertake some form of work once inside.

In the department of Cochabamba, an organisation called Ayni Ruway provides a means for the prisoners to earn a living by providing services like carpentry and metal workshops, along with educational classes and computer training.

In the men's prisons, inmates are permitted to live there with their wives and children, who are allowed to leave the prison during the day to attend school or work. As a result of this and the lack of funding, many prisons are acutely overcrowded. In the Cochabamba department, the only purpose-built prison is El Abra, the maximum security prison; the other main prisons in town are generally housed in converted old warehouses and are often inadequate.

== Recruitment and training ==
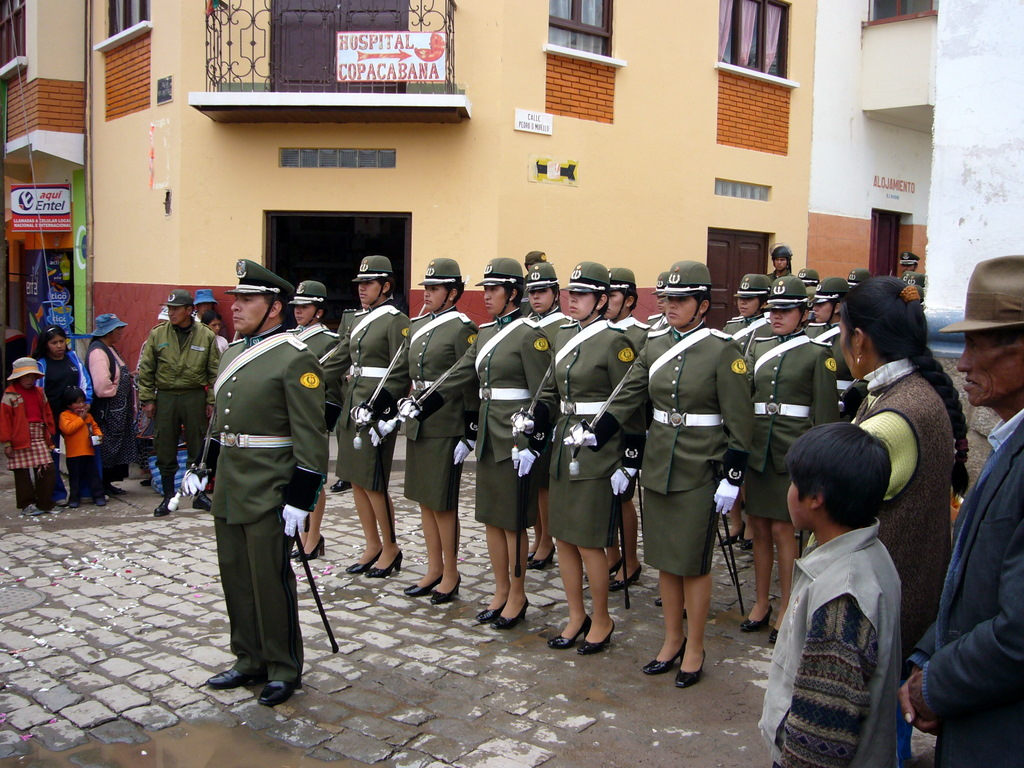
Police parade in Copacabana, Bolivia.

Historically, the police force was an unpopular career choice because of poor pay, conditions, and prestige and thus did not attract high-quality personnel. Officers and higher civilian employees, who generally were drawn from the small urban middle class, were of relatively higher quality. Many officer personnel came from the army. Officers were commissioned by graduation from the National Police Academy, by transfer from the army, by direct political appointment for demonstrated ability, or by outright patronage.

Civilians were nearly always political appointees. Although specialized education was not a prerequisite for a civilian's appointment, some degree of qualification was usually present and facilitated on-the-job training. Enlisted personnel received most of their training on the job during the first four months after enlistment.

The academic year of the police education system began in February. The Young Men's Basic Police School (Escuela Básica Policial de Varones—EBPV), which had 120 students in 1983, provided a one-year training course at the operational level for subalterns of the national police.

The National Police Academy offered a four-year course for officers. In the early 1980s, the academy's curriculum included criminal law, penal and civil investigation, criminology, ballistics, laboratory science, narcotics, vehicular and pedestrian traffic, order and security of persons and installations, martial arts, and human and public relations. The academy also offered a specialized course patterned on the counterinsurgency course of the United States Army Special Warfare School at Fort Bragg, North Carolina.

The police academy additionally offered a program of foreign training for officers. Selected personnel were sent to training courses either in the United States or in neighboring countries, particularly Argentina, Chile, Paraguay, and Peru. On completing their courses abroad, these trainees returned to Bolivia for duty, to lecture at the academy, or to organize and conduct unit-level courses throughout the corps.

In the past, admissions requirements for the academy gave greater importance to political reliability and unquestioned loyalty to the government than to education. By the early 1980s, applicants had to undergo medical, physical, and mental examinations, as well as tests of their general knowledge. Cadets accepted to attend the academy were not subject to the age limitations for enlisted military service. Matriculation exempted them automatically from their military obligations. The normal student body ranged from 480 to 500 cadets divided into four courses.

In 1983 the academy had very few women cadets, and the incorporation of women into police ranks was at an experimental stage. On graduation, which required passing an examination, cadets received a bachelor of humanities certificate, a saber to symbolize officer rank, and a commission as second lieutenant in the carabineers. Those graduates who were drawn from brigades then returned to their units to organize local classes.

The Higher Police School (Escuela Superior de Policías—ESP) was created in February 1969 for officers in the ranks of lieutenant colonel and above. The ESP prepared higher officers to manage the command departments, operational units, and training institutes. In 1983, the ESP's student body consisted of fifty-seven higher officers.

== See also ==
- Crime in Bolivia
- Narcotics in Bolivia
