= Luis Arce Gómez =

Bolivian Minister of the Interior (1980–1981)

Minister of the Interior, Migration, and Justice
- In office 18 July 1980 – 26 February 1981
- President: Luis García Meza
- Preceded by: Antonio Arnez Camacho
- Succeeded by: Celso Torrelio

Personal details
- Born: 1938 Sucre, Bolivia
- Died: 30 March 2020 (aged 82) La Paz, Bolivia
- Cause of death: Septic shock
- Parent(s): Luis Arce Pacheco; Aida Gómez
- Relatives: Roberto Suárez Gómez
- Education: Military College of the Army

Military service
- Allegiance: Bolivia
- Branch/service: Bolivian Army
- Rank: Colonel

Luis Arce Gómez (1938 – March 30, 2020) was a colonel in the Bolivian Army. In 1980 he backed the bloody coup (sometimes referred to as the "Cocaine Coup") that brought to power the General Luis García Meza. Arce served as García Meza's Minister of the Interior.

== Biography ==
=== Early life ===
Arce was born in 1938 in Sucre, Bolivia. He was the cousin of the notorious Bolivian drug lord Roberto Suárez Gómez.

=== Career ===
Arce's tenure as Minister involved the passing of such measures as the banning of all political parties, the incarceration and/or exile of most political opponents, the repression of trade unions, and the censorship of the mass media. Arce had said that all Bolivians who may be opposed to the new order should "walk around with their written will under their arms."

The García Meza government was also deeply involved in drug trafficking activities, with Arce as a link. Eventually, Arce was forced to resign, as was García.

=== Incarceration ===
In the late 1980s, Arce was extradited to the United States, where he was put in jail, serving a lengthy sentence for drug trafficking. On April 21, 1993, while he was still incarcerated, he was condemned by the Bolivian justice system to 30 years in prison for serious human rights violations incurred by the regime he took part in.

In November 2007 he was released from his US prison sentence and applied for political asylum in the US. His application was denied, and on July 9, 2009, he was deported back to Bolivia to serve out the sentence for his convictions there. He was held in Chonchocoro Prison in La Paz. In 2009, he was in poor health but apparently expressed a willingness to speak about his role in the 1980-81 dictatorship. In September 2010, Arce Gómez offered to share his knowledge about the remains of people who disappeared during the dictatorship in "exchange for something": "If they want to know something... I have to gain something as well. It's not free." His sentence is not subject to negotiation. Interior Minister Sacha Llorenty stated that Arce Gómez could face disciplinary sanctions for refusing to reveal this information, although the legal basis for doing so was disputed by legal experts.

On 17 January 2017, Italian courts condemned Arce to life imprisonment for his role in the death of Italian dual-nationals in the 1970s and 1980s. The deaths had been part of Operation Condor.

== In popular culture ==
General Cocombre, a character based on Gómez, is featured briefly in the 1983 film Scarface. The picture of Cocombre that the Bolivian cocaine investigator Orlando Gutiérrez shows on TV during his interview (that Alejandro Sosa shows to Tony Montana and the rest of his guests), is in fact of Gómez.

Political offices
Vacant Title last held by Antonio Arnez Camacho	Minister of the Interior, Migration, and Justice; 1980–1981	Succeeded by Celso Torrelio
