= Ocotepeque =

- Municipality
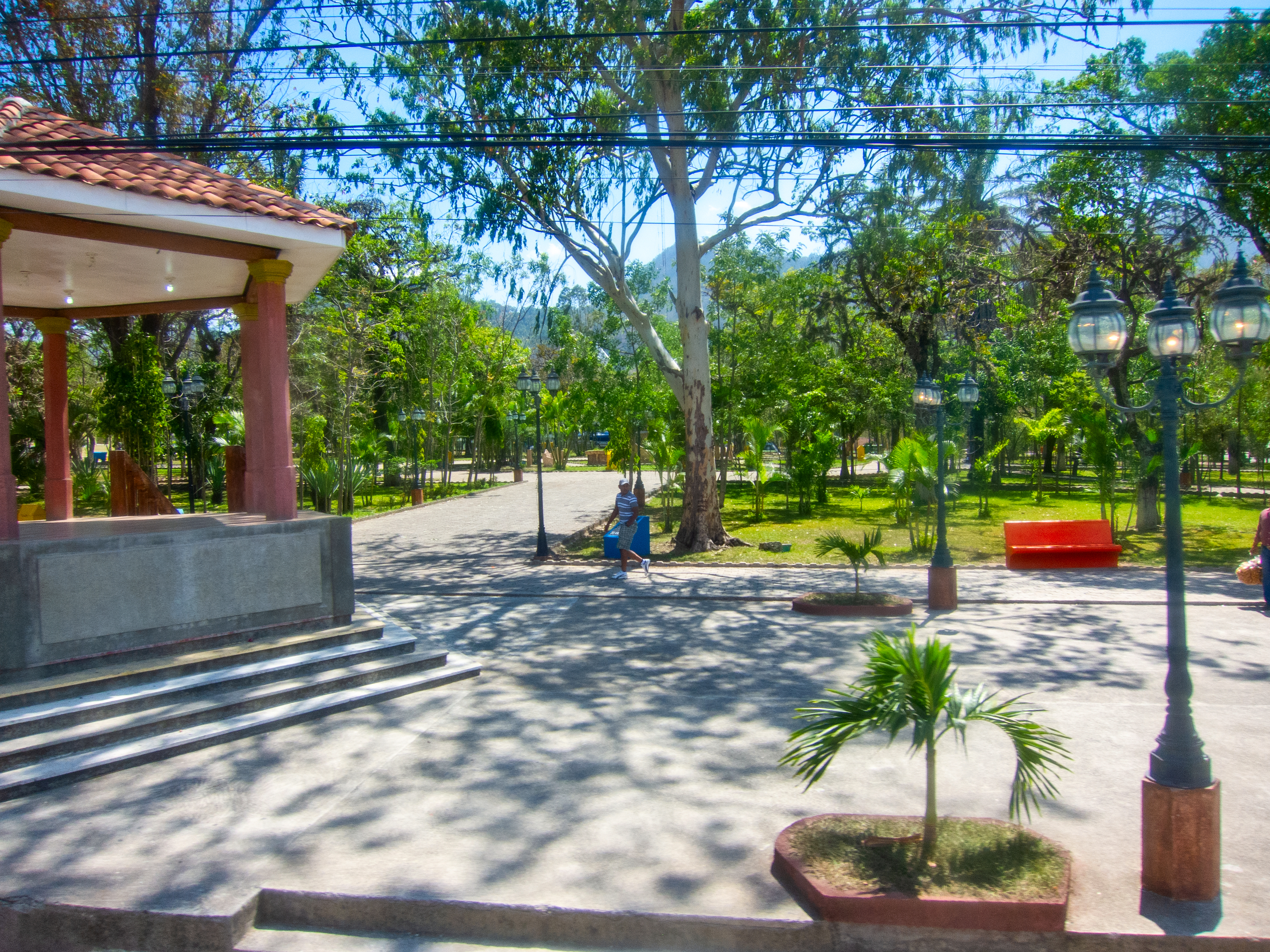

- Location within Honduras
- Coordinates: 14°26′N 89°11′W
- Country: Honduras
- Department: Ocotepeque
- Villages: 9
- Founded: 1530

Area
  - Municipality: 177 km^{2} (68 sq mi)

Population (2020 projection)
  - Municipality: 26,391
  - Density: 149/km^{2} (386/sq mi)
  - Urban: 16,575

Ocotepeque is a municipality in the Honduran department of Ocotepeque. The town of Nueva Ocotepeque is the municipal seat and the capital of the department. The name Ocotepeque comes from the Nahuatl language and means "Pine Mountain".

The department borders two countries, Guatemala and El Salvador and covers 1,630 km^{2}. It is mostly mountainous, and has a population of 111,474 (2006). Its main economic activities are agricultural, including coffee, corn, cabbage, sugar cane, and onions. Due to its favourable location just a few kilometres away from the border with El Salvador at El Poy, as well as the border with Guatemala at Agua Caliente, Ocotepeque has the economic benefit of being a tri-country centre of business. It also attracts residents of smaller neighbouring towns, who come to Ocotepeque to purchase things or to study.

== Location ==
Directly to the north are the municipalities of Sinuapa and Concepción; to the south is El Salvador; to the east is Sinuapa; and to the west is the municipality of Santa Fe. About three hours by bus to the north is the larger city of Santa Rosa de Copán. The closest airport in Honduras is located approximately 5–6 hours to the north in San Pedro Sula. Tegucigalpa, where Honduras' other major airport is located, is 10–12 hours away by bus. Ocotepeque is also located about 3 hours from San Salvador, the capital of El Salvador, where another major airport is located.

== Areas of interest ==
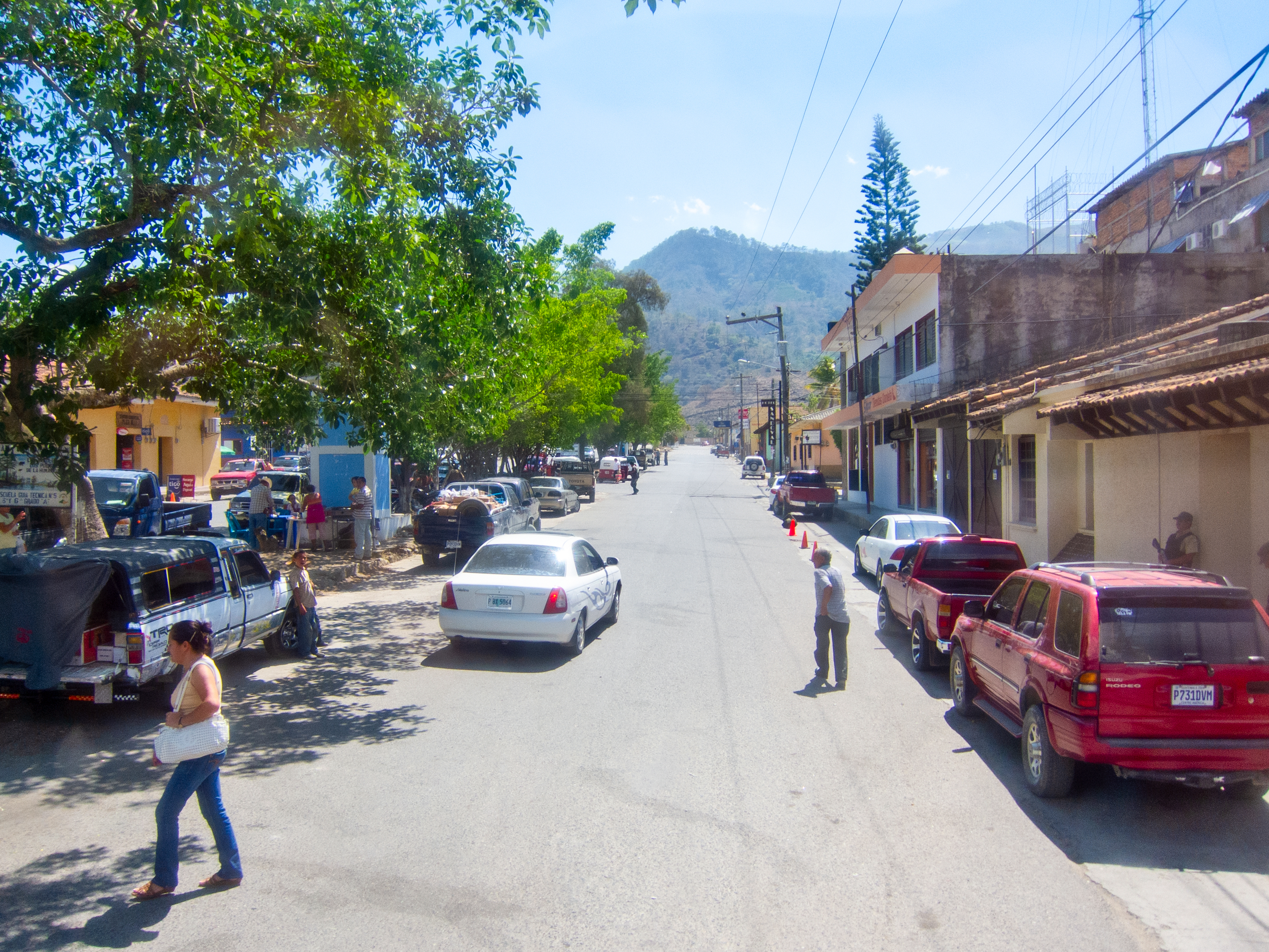
Streets of Ocotepeque

The Trifinio Fraternidad Transboundary Biosphere Reserve is a nature preserve shared by Honduras, Guatemala, and El Salvador. Ocotepeque also boasts the Güisayote Biological Reserve, located about 35 minutes out of town. The city of Esquipulas, Guatemala is approximately 45 minutes from Ocotepeque and is home to one of the oldest churches in Central America, and what many consider to be the most sacred shrine in Central America. Ocotepeque is accessible by several major bus lines from the major cities, including Sultana and Congolon. Many of these buses run a main route up the western border of the country, with San Pedro Sula and Ocotepeque as their first/last stops, and stop at many towns in between, including La Labor, La Union, Cucuyagua, Santa Rosa de Copán, and La Entrada.

== History ==
- Ocotepeque was founded in 1530. In the first Political Territorial Division in 1825, it formed part of the territory of Santa Rosa in the department of Gracias. On 13 April 1843, it was given the title of "town", and in July 1870, it received the title of "city". It was then a municipality of Copán until February 1906. When the department was divided up in 1926, it became a district, formed by the municipalities of Sinuapa, Concepción, and Santa Fe.
- On 7 June 1934, the city was destroyed by massive flooding of the Marchala River, and it was decreed that Sinuapa would be the provisional capital of the district. After a year of reconstruction, the new town of Nueva Ocotepeque was founded and declared to be the head of the department. By 1958, just "Ocotepeque" was used to refer to the new city, and the original town became called "Antigua Ocotepeque". Today, the only things remaining from the pre-flood era in Antigua Ocotepeque are a church and a massive tree in the town centre.
- In 1969, Ocotepeque and the mountains surrounding it became part of the battlegrounds for the four-day Football War between Honduras and El Salvador, which began over land rights disputes and was supposedly sparked by a tense soccer game between the two countries.

== Demographics ==
At the time of the 2013 Honduras census, Ocotepeque municipality had a population of 23,096. Of these, 90.25% were Mestizo, 6.46% Indigenous (5.88% Chʼortiʼ), 3.00% White, 0.28% Black or Afro-Honduran and 0.01% others.

== Education ==
Ocotepeque has a great number of public school and has been selected as the best public education in the whole country. Ocotepeque has a number of public schools as well as two private bilingual schools, Instituto San Francisco de Asís and My Little Red House Bilingual School . My Little Red House accept volunteers year and month-round to teach English as part of their English core program to develop and improve the education.

== Famous Residents ==
- Ramón Villeda Morales (President of Honduras from 1957 to 1963) was born in Ocotepeque on 26 November 1908.
- Javier Monthiel (singer and composer from 1990–present) was born in Ocotepeque on April 11, 1967; his compositions include the popular songs Así es mi tierra, Mujeres Latinas, Amiga and Más allá del Corazón.
