= Chʼortiʼ people =

Chʼortiʼ
Total population
- c. 157,000

Regions with significant populations
- Guatemala: 112,432
- Honduras: 33,256 (2013)
- El Salvador: Estimated 11,000

Languages
- Chʼortiʼ, Spanish

Religion
- Catholic, Evangelicalist, Maya religion

Related ethnic groups
- Maya people

The Chʼortiʼ people (alternatively, Chʼortiʼ Maya or Chorti) are one of the Indigenous Maya peoples, who primarily reside in communities and towns of northeastern Guatemala, northwestern Honduras, and northern El Salvador. Their indigenous language, also known as Chʼortiʼ, is a survival of Classic Maya language, the language of the inscriptions in Copan. It is the first language of approximately 15,000 people, although the majority of present-day Chʼortiʼ speakers are bilingual in Spanish as well.

== History ==
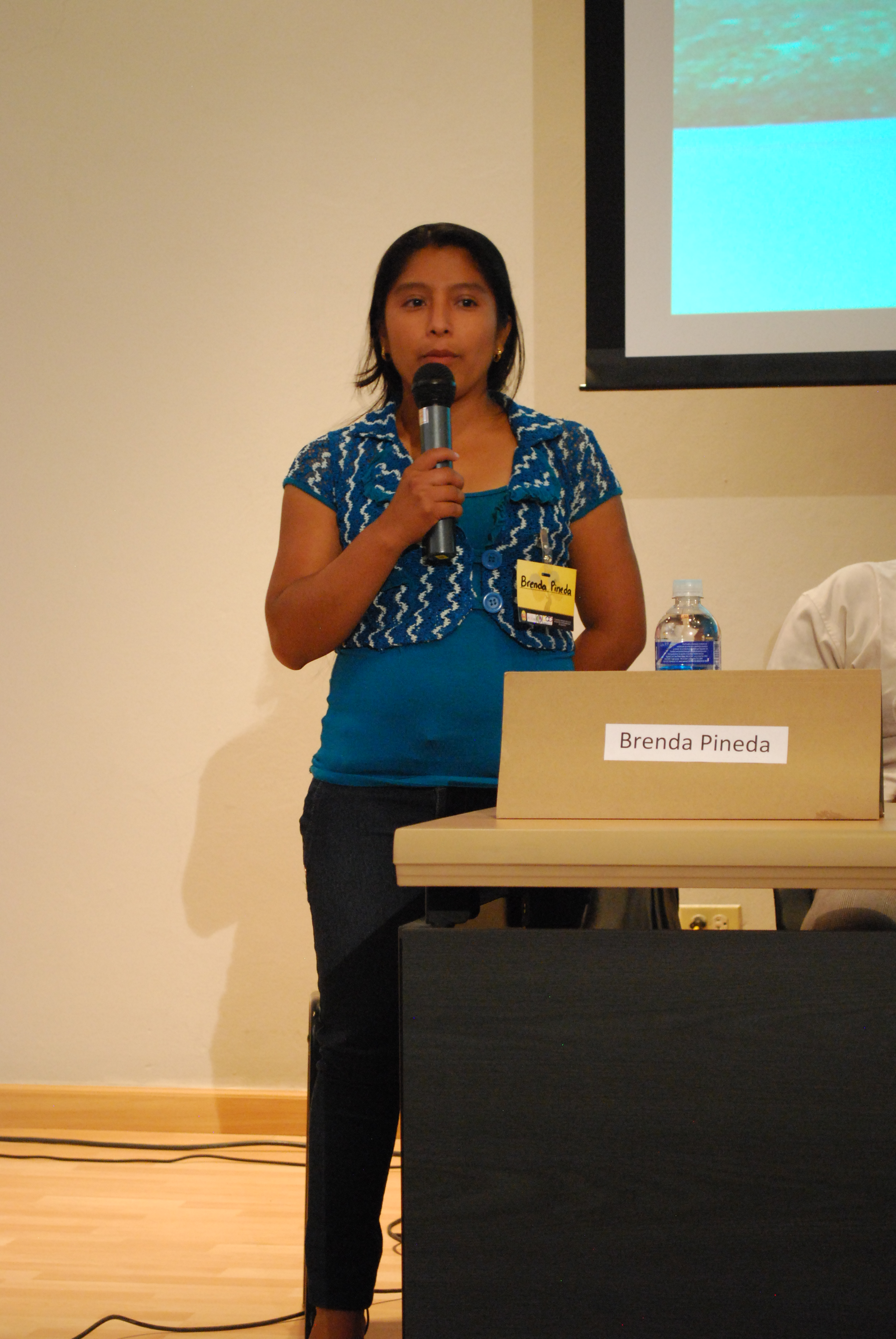
Brenda Suyapa Pineda representing the Chortis of Honduras at the Universidad Nacional Autónoma de Honduras

The Chʼortiʼ area, which had Copán as its cultural center, was the headquarters of the ancient Mayan civilization. The Chʼortiʼ people in Honduras are known for their first ruler Yax K'uk' Mo' (pronounced 'Yash Kook Mo') who was the founder and first king of the dynasty that ruled the Maya city of Copan (also known as Oxwitik) for nearly 400 years. Known formally by his royal name, K'inich Yax K'uk' Mo', he reigned for eleven years from 426 to 437 CE. His name is translated as "Radiant First Quetzal Macaw" or "Sun-eyed Green Macaw" or even "Sun in the Mouth of the Quetzal Bird".

The Chʼortiʼ belong to the Meridional Mayans, and are closely related to the Mayans in Yucatán, Belize and Northern Guatemala. They are also somewhat related to the Choles, Mayans who currently live in Chiapas.

== Geographical location ==
Map of El Salvador's Indigenous Peoples at the time of the Spanish conquest: 1. Pipil people, 2. Lenca, 3. Kakawira o Cacaopera, 4. Xinca, 5. Maya Ch'orti' people, 6. Maya Poqomam people, 7. Mangue o Chorotega.

Historically, the Chʼortiʼ Maya were located in the Ocotepeque and Copan departments, as well as in the northern strip of the Cortes and Santa Barbara departments. This geographical area extends all the way to El Salvador to the northwest and all the way to Chiquimula on the west, and to the Golfo Dulce to the north. Currently, the majority of the Chʼortiʼ populations are located in Guatemala in the following municipalities of the Chiquimula department: Camotán, Jocotán, Esquipulas, Quetzaltepeque, San Juan Ermita, Olopa, and in La Union, department of Zacapa).

The current Guatemalan Chʼortiʼ population estimate is 46,833.

The Chʼortiʼ population in Honduras live in areas of difficult access in the Copan and Ocotepeque departments, like Chonco, Colon Jubuco, San Rafael, Tapescos, Carrizalon, La Laguna, Santa Rita, Antigua Ocotepeque, Nueva Ocotepeque, and Sensenti.

The remaining Ch’orti descendants of El Salvador are mostly in the department of Chalatenango in the municipality of Tejutla is where most Ch’orti descendants are still found. This town was founded in the 5th century, becoming an important place for the Chortis tribes. It was originally founded in the place known as Las Mataras, which was destroyed with the arrival of the Spanish.

The current Honduran Chʼortiʼ population estimate is 4,200. They are mostly farmers, and they lived in areas mixed with mestizos.

== Organization and culture ==
The Chʼortiʼ in Copan speak Spanish; most Chʼortiʼ speakers are in Guatemala. This is because the political division between Honduras and Guatemala, and the inherent movement restriction between the two countries.

However, the traditional customs of dress have been kept, as well as musical traditions, expressed using instruments like teponangas, drums, whistles, chinchins, sonajas and horns. The most traditional dance is called the "dance of the giants".

Their food is based mainly on corn and beans. Corn is prepared in different ways: as a drink, like chilate, pozol, sweet atole, and sour atole (chuco), tortillas, tamales, totoposte and also alcoholic drinks like chicha.

Chʼortiʼ religion is based on admiring and adoring nature, through rituals dedicated to the gods of the Earth and the Wind.
