= Montaña de Erapuca =

Mountain peak in Honduras

- Location within Honduras

Highest point
- Elevation: 2,750 m (9,020 ft)
- Coordinates: 14°49′15″N 88°59′42″W

Geography
- Location: Copán and Ocotepeque Department, Honduras
- Parent range: Sierra del Merendón

Montaña de Erapuca, commonly known as "Erapuca", is the highest point of the "Sierra de Merendón" in Honduras. Erapuca has an altitude of 2,690 meters above sea level. The Sierra del Merendón, to which this peak belongs, is located in the south of the department of Copán, between the Valle de Cucuyagua and Valle de Sensenti, and serving as a border boundary with the Ocotepeque Department.
