= Chiquimula Department =

Department of Guatemala

Chiquimula Department Departmento de Chiquimula
- Department of Guatemala
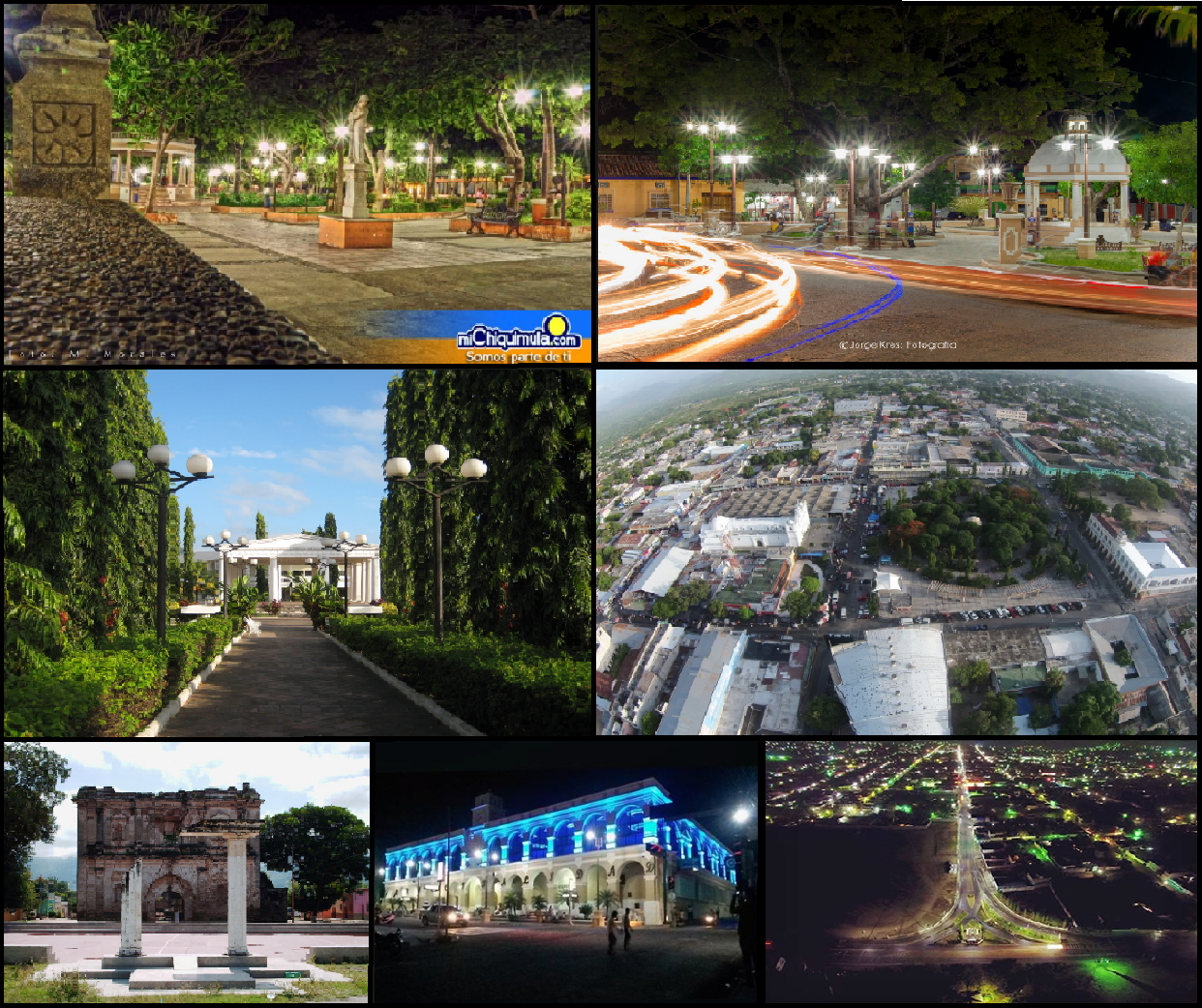
- Collage of Chiquimula

- Flag Coat of arms

- Coordinates: 14°47′58″N 89°32′37″W
- Country: Guatemala
- Capital: Chiquimula
- Municipalities: 11
- Established: 1871

Government
  - Type: Departmental

Area
  - Department of Guatemala: 2,376 km^{2} (917 sq mi)
- Elevation: 424 m (1,391 ft)

Population (2018)
  - Department of Guatemala: 415,063
  - Density: 174.7/km^{2} (452.4/sq mi)
  - Urban: 155,171
  - Ethnicities: Chorti Ladino
  - Languages: Chorti Spanish
- Time zone: UTC-6
- ISO 3166 code: GT-CQ

Chiquimula is one of the 22 departments of Guatemala, in Central America. The departmental capital is also called Chiquimula. The department was established by decree in 1871, and forms a part of the southeastern region of Guatemala. Physically, it is mountainous, with a climate that varies between tropical and temperate, depending on the location.

== History ==
At the time of Spanish contact, Chiquimula was part of the indigenous kingdom of Chiquimulha, or Payaqui, governed from its capital at Copanti (now Copan, in Honduras). This kingdom also included portions of Honduras and El Salvador. The name Chiquimula is derived from the Nahuatl chiquimoltlān, from chiquimolin meaning "finches" with the locative suffix -tlān, to mean "place of many finches".

Chiquimula de la Sierra ("Chiquimula in the Highlands"), occupying the area of the modern department, was inhabited by Ch'orti' Maya at the time of the conquest. The first Spanish reconnaissance of this region took place in 1524 by an expedition that included Hernando de Chávez, Juan Durán, Bartolomé Becerra and Cristóbal Salvatierra, amongst others. In 1526 three Spanish captains, Juan Pérez Dardón, Sancho de Barahona and Bartolomé Becerra, invaded Chiquimula on the orders of Pedro de Alvarado. The indigenous population soon rebelled against excessive Spanish demands, but the rebellion was quickly put down in April 1530. However, the region was not considered fully conquered until a campaign by Jorge de Bocanegra in 1531–1532 that also took in parts of Jalapa. The afflictions of Old World diseases, war and overwork in the mines and encomiendas took a heavy toll on the inhabitants of eastern Guatemala, to the extent that indigenous population levels never recovered to their pre-conquest levels.

The modern department was created by executive decree on 10 November 1871. The decree reduced the area covered by the administrative division of Chiquimula by removing that portion that now forms the modern department of Zacapa and part of the department of Izabal.

== Geography ==
Chiquimula is located in the southeastern region of Guatemala. It is bordered by the department of Zacapa to the north and the departments of Jalapa and Zacapa to the west. To the south, Chiqimula is bordered by the department of Jutiapa and the republic of El Salvador. To the east, the department is bordered by the republic of Honduras.

The departmental capital is the city of Chiquimula, which is 170 kilometres (110 mi) from Guatemala City.

Mountains cross the department from north to south, crossing from the border with Jalapa and joining the Sierra del Merendón range, which extends into neighbouring Honduras and El Salvador. Chiquimula possesses two drainage basins, one flowing towards the Atlantic Ocean, the other towards the Pacific Ocean. The principal river in the department is the Río Grande, or Camotán River, which flows in from Honduras, before becoming the Jocotán River, and flowing into the Motagua River to eventually drain into the Caribbean Sea. In the south of the department, the most important rivers are the Anguiatú and the Ostúa.

The department has numerous mineral deposits, and silver has been mined there since the Spanish colonial period.

== Climate ==
Chiquimula is divided into two climatic zones; the municipalities of Concepción Las Minas, Esquipulas, Ipala, Olopa and Quetzaltepeque are temperate, while Camotán, Chiquimula, Jocotán, San Jacinto, San José La Arada and San Juan Ermita are tropical. In the temperate areas, the average temperature is 27–28 °C (81–82 °F); in the tropical areas it reaches 36–38 °C (97–100 °F). Climate change has notably affected the department, with maximum temperatures reaching 42 °C (108 °F), and a decrease in rainfall contributing to scarcity of foodstuffs. The lowest recorded temperature between 2009 and 2013 was 7.6 °C (45.7 °F) in 2010; during the same period, relative humidity varied between 74.5% and 76.6%. Average annual precipitation is 1,036 millimetres (40.8 in).

== Population ==
At the 2018 census, the population of Chiquimula was 415,063. In 2002, 83.33% of the population was non-indigenous and 16.67% was indigenous. The majority of the indigenous population are Ch'orti' Maya, with a very small number of Xinka and Garifuna. In 2006, 59.5% of the population of the department was living in poverty, with 27.7% of the population living in extreme poverty (included within the former percentage). Poverty levels tend to be higher in the northern portions of the department, and lower in the south. In 2002, the department of Chiquimula contained 2.7% of the national population, with a population density of 127 people/km^{2} (330 people/mi^{2}), ranking it 10th of 22 departments for population density. In 2013, 25.5% of the population were recorded as illiterate, demonstrating a year-on-year reduction in illiteracy rates over the previous five years.

Census	Population
1981	168,863
1994	230,767
2002	302,485

In 2002, 26% of the population of the department lived in urban areas, and 74% in rural areas. There were an average of 5.1 people per household; averaging 4.5 people per household in urban areas and rising to an average of 5.3 people per household in rural areas.

Total population (2002)	Aged 0–6	Aged 7–14	Aged 15–17	Aged 18–59	Aged 60–64	Aged 65+
302,485	63,814	65,297	21,020	130,841	6,558	14,995
100%	21.1%	21.6%	6.9%	43.3%	2.2%	4.9%

=== Ethnicity and language ===
Breakdown of population by ethnicity for the whole departmental population, and first language in those aged three and above, as recorded in the 2002 census.

Category	Group	Population (2002)	Ladino (Spanish)	Maya	Xinka	Garifuna	Other
Ethnicity	Whole population	302,485	255,921	45,558	76	20	910
Ethnicity	%	100%	84.6%	15.1%	0.0%	0.0%	0.3%
First language	Aged 3+	275,222	263,486	11,548	31	39	118
First language	%	91% of pop.	95.7%	4.2%	0.0%	0.0%	0.0%

=== Mortality ===
In 2013, 2095 deaths were registered in the department, demonstrating a 1% drop on the previous year, and 2.9% of the national total:

Mortality in 2013
Cause	%
Pneumonia	19.7%
Myocardial infarction	18.9%
Gunshot wound	16.4%
Heart failure	10.7%
Diabetes mellitus	8.4%
Unspecified	6.7%
Stroke	6.1%
Stomach cancer	5.3%
Knife wound	4.1%
Diarrhoea	3.7%

== Governance ==
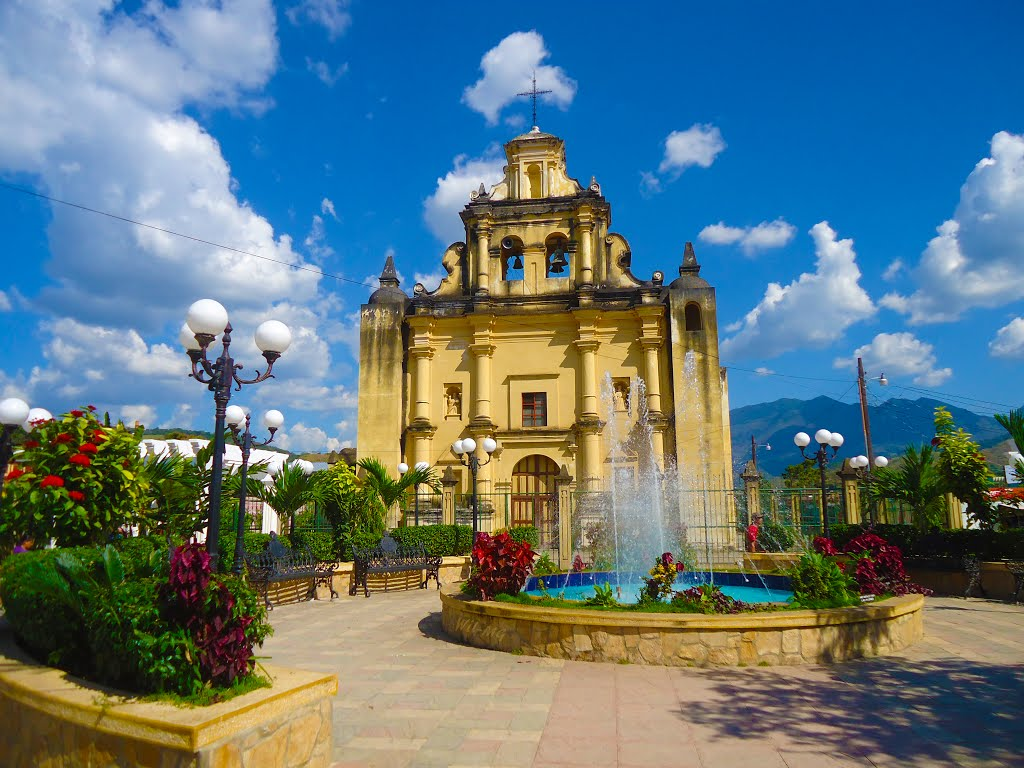
The central park and Catholic church of Jocotán

As with all Guatemalan departments, the regional government is headed by a governor appointed directly by the president of Guatemala.

=== Municipalities ===
Since its establishment as a department in the late 19th century, Chiquimula has been divided into eleven municipalities.

Municipality	Population in 2002	Indigenous %	Non-indigenous %	Extent
Camotán	48,440	83.16%	16.84%	231 square kilometres (89 sq mi)
Chiquimula	91,951	2.63%	97.37%	353 square kilometres (136 sq mi)
Concepción Las Minas	12,853	1.53%	98.47%	215 square kilometres (83 sq mi)
Esquipulas	53,201	1.65%	98.35%	502 square kilometres (194 sq mi)
Ipala	19,851	0.85%	99.15%	231 square kilometres (89 sq mi)
Jocotán	53,960	81.25%	18.75%	252 square kilometres (97 sq mi)
Olopa	22,993	34.08%	65.92%	112 square kilometres (43 sq mi)
Quezaltepeque	26,382	1.57%	98.43%	245 square kilometres (95 sq mi)
San Jacinto	12,005	2.20%	97.80%	71 square kilometres (27 sq mi)
San José La Arada	8,081	2.70%	97.30%	116 square kilometres (45 sq mi)
San Juan Ermita	13,108	8.92%	91.08%	90 square kilometres (35 sq mi)

== Economy ==
Principle products of the department of Chiquimula are cattle, rice, maize, beans, potato, coffee, cacao, peanuts and tropical fruits, ceramics, rope, leather and palm products. Palm handicrafts include the manufacture of a variety of baskets for different purposes.

== Tourism ==
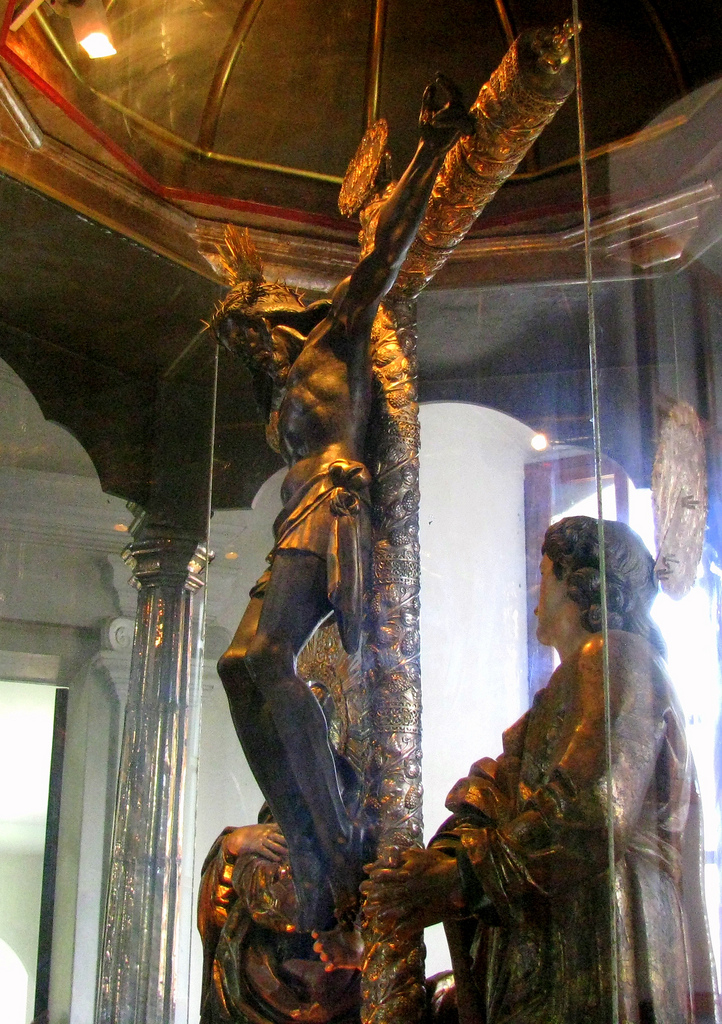
The Black Christ of Esquipulas is the focus of international pilgrimage

Esquipulas is one of the most important centres for religious pilgrimage in Central America, focused upon the Black Christ of Esquipulas contained in the basilica church, which has been venerated due to miracles attributed to the image.

== In the news 2021 ==
In January 2021, a caravan of between 7,000 and 9,000 migrants from Honduras, who had departed from San Pedro Sula was heading towards the United States and broke through police lines at Vado Hondo, a village near the city of Chiquimula.
