= Olopa =

Coordinates: 14°41′N 89°21′W

Olopa is a municipality in the Chiquimula department of Guatemala. The municipality comprises an area of 112 km^{2}, distributed in 1 town (Olopa) and 29 villages, with a total population of 27,511.

It is bordered on the north by the municipality of Jocotán, on the south and east by Esquipulas, and on the west by Quezaltepeque and San Juan Hermitage. It has a subtropical highland climate (Köppen: Cwb).

== History ==
Olopa was originally inhabited by the Ch'orti' but was invaded by tribes of the Valley of Mexico. In April or May 1860, the Capuchin Fathers, who had evangelized in the eastern of the country, donated to the inhabitants of the valley of Olopa an "Image of the Divine Shepherd" and constructed a church, made of straw. In March 1870, according to the Corregidor de Chiquimula Don Juan Peralta Baptist, Olopa was an indigenous town, with a pajiza church, and a resident Catholic Priest. On 1870-11-25 Don Juan Peralta Baptist authorized the establishment of Olopa as a municipality.

== Climate ==
Olapa is located between the 1,300 and 1,600 meters above sea level, with an average of 130 days of rain per year. Temperature varies between 18 and 25 degrees Celsius.
