= Chʼortiʼ language =

Mayan language spoken in Central America

Chʼortiʼ
- Ch'orti', Tcor ti’
- Native to: Guatemala, Honduras, El Salvador
- Region: Copán
- Ethnicity: Chʼortiʼ
- Native speakers: (30,000 cited 2000)
- Language family: Mayan: Cholan–Tzeltalan; Cholan; Chʼortiʼ
- Early form: Classic Maya

Language codes
- ISO 639-3: caa
- Glottolog: chor1273
- ELP: Ch'orti'
- Chʼortiʼ

The Chʼortiʼ language (sometimes also Chorti) is a Mayan language, spoken by the indigenous Maya people who are also known as the Chʼortiʼ or Chʼortiʼ Maya. Chʼortiʼ is a direct descendant of the Classic Maya language in which many of the pre-Columbian inscriptions using the Maya script were written, mostly between the years AD 250 and 850. It is spoken in parts of Guatemala and Honduras, and is considered an endangered language.

== Classification ==
Chʼortiʼ can be called a living "Rosetta Stone" of Mayan languages. Chʼortiʼ is an important tool for interpreting the contents of Maya glyphic writings, some of which are not yet fully understood. For several years, many linguists and anthropologists expected to grasp the Chʼortiʼ culture and language by studying its words and expressions. Chʼortiʼ is spoken mainly in and around Jocotán and Camotán, Chiquimula department, Guatemala, as well as in adjacent areas of parts of western Honduras near the Copán Ruins. Because the Classic Mayan language was ancestral to the modern Chʼorti, it can be used to decipher the ancient language. Researchers realized that the ancient language's script was based more on phonetics than previously thought.

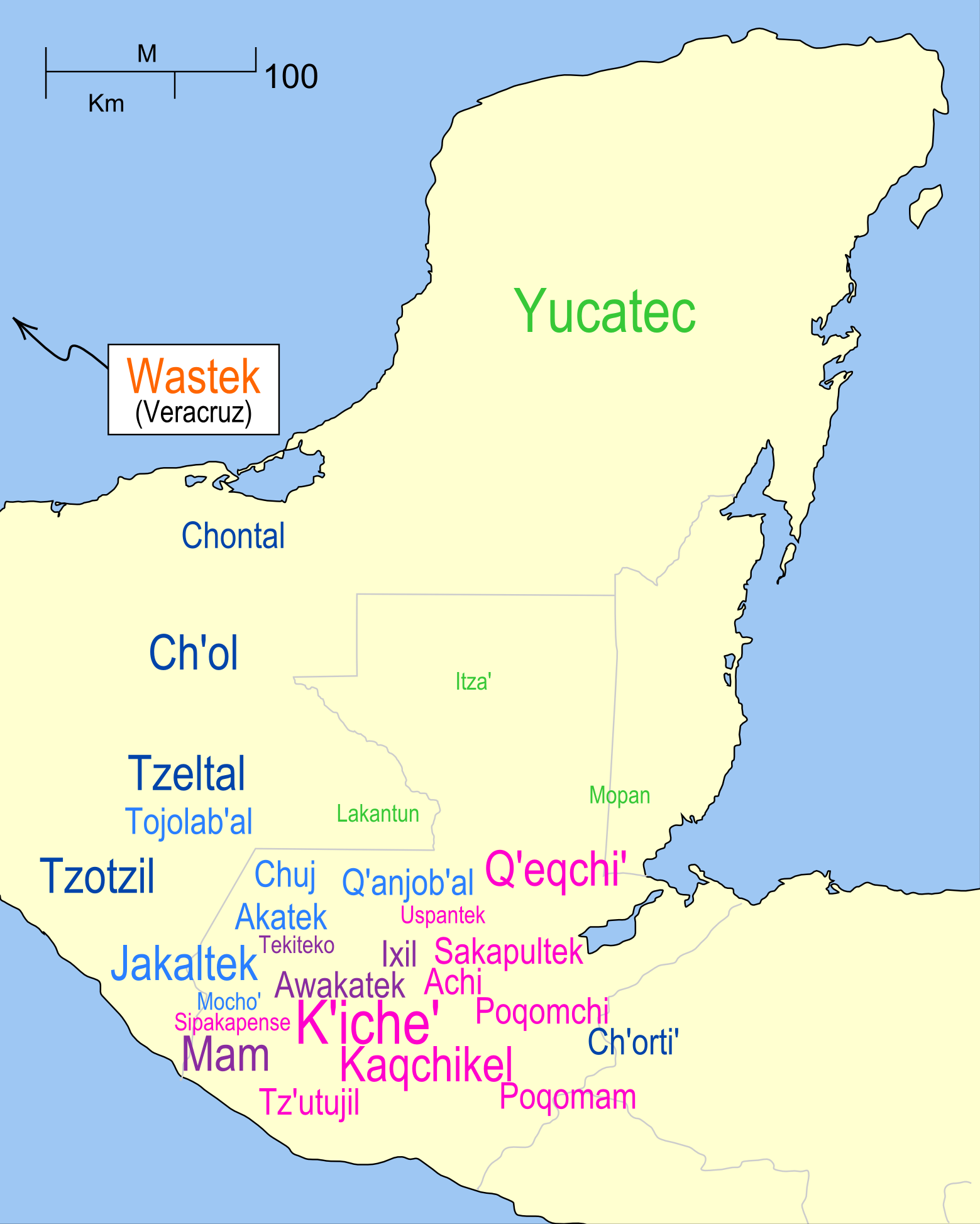
A map showing the present-day locations of the Mayan Languages. The colors of the language names show closely-related groups. The size of the name shows the relative number of speakers.

The name Chʼortiʼ (with unglottalized ⟨ch⟩) means 'language of the corn farmers', a reference to the traditional agricultural activity of Chʼortiʼ families. It is one of the three modern descendants of the Chʼolan language, which constitute a sub-group of Mayan languages. The other two are Chontal and Chʼol. These three descendants are still spoken today. Chʼortiʼ and Chʼolti are two sub-branches belonging to Eastern Chʼolan; Chʼolti is, however, already extinct.

There are some debates among scholars about how Chʼolan should be classified. John Robertson considered the direct ancestor of colonial Chʼoltiʼ to be the language of the Mayan script (also known as Mayan Glyphs). The language of the Mayan Glyphs is described as 'Classic Chʼoltiʼan' by John Robertson, David Stuart, and Stephen Houston. The language of the Mayan script is thus the ancestor of Chʼortiʼ. The relationship is shown in the chart below.

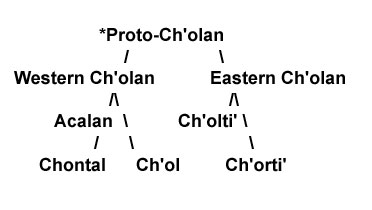

== Endangerment ==
The Chʼortiʼ people are descendants of the people who lived in and around Copán, one of the cultural capitals of the ancient Maya area. This covers parts of modern-day Honduras and Guatemala. Chʼorti is considered an endangered language as well as an endangered culture.

== Geographic location ==
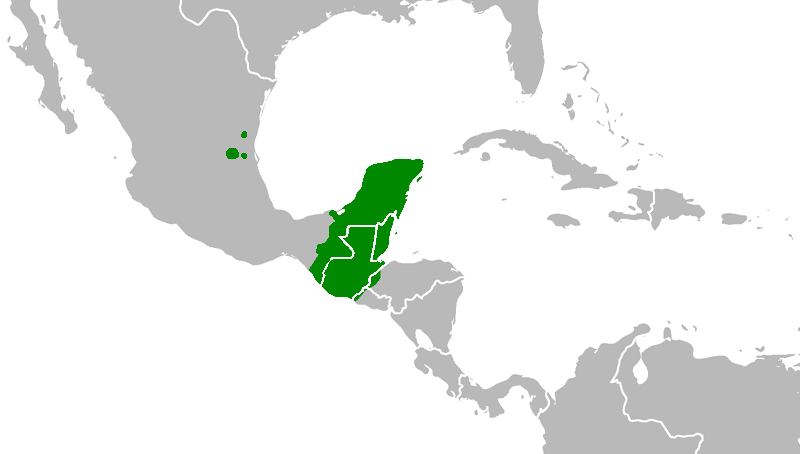

This region is the only region in the world that Chʼorti speakers can be found. Although the area is completely shaded in, the majority of speakers reside in Guatemala, while the rest are sparsely distributed throughout the rest of the area.

=== Honduras ===
The government of Honduras has been trying to promote a uniform national language of Spanish, and therefore discourages the use and teaching of native languages such as Chʼorti. The Chʼortiʼ people in Honduras face homogenization and have to assimilate to their surroundings. The government has been clashing with the Chʼorti people over land disputes from the 1800s, which puts the people (and thus the language) at risk. In 1997, two prominent Chʼorti leaders were assassinated. This assassination is just one example of many cases where Chʼorti advocates have been harmed or killed. Every one of these killings reduces the number of Chʼorti speakers. As of right now, there are only 10 remaining native speakers in Honduras.

=== Guatemala ===
The government of Guatemala has been more supportive of Chʼorti speakers and has promoted programs that encourage the learning and teaching of Chʼorti. The Chʼorti's in Guatemala wear traditional clothing, unlike their counterparts in Honduras, who wear modern-day clothing. Currently there are about 55,250 Chʼorti speakers in Guatemala. Even though Guatemala has established Spanish as its official language, it supports the teaching of these native languages.

The majority of Chʼortiʼ live in the Chiquimula Department of Guatemala, approximately 52,000. The remaining 4,000 live in Copán, Honduras. The Kʼicheʼ Maya however, dominated the Chʼortiʼ dating back to the early fifteenth century. Warfare as well as disease devastated much of the Chʼortiʼ during the sixteenth and seventeenth centuries. Much of their land was lost to the Guatemalan government in the nineteenth century as well. More recently, 25 percent of the Guatemalan Chʼortiʼ went to the United States during the 1980s to escape political persecution.

== Phonology and orthography ==
The Chʼortiʼ have their own standard way of writing their language. However, inaccurate ways to represent phonemes led to some variation among recent publications.

=== Consonants ===
		Labial	Alveolar		Palatal	Velar	Glottal
		Labial	plain	sibilant	Palatal	Velar	Glottal
Nasals		m ⟨m⟩	n ⟨n⟩				
Plosive/ Affricate	tenuis	p ⟨p⟩	t ⟨t⟩	t͡s ⟨tz⟩	t͡ʃ ⟨ch⟩	k ⟨k⟩	ʔ ⟨’⟩
Plosive/ Affricate	glottalic	ɓ ⟨bʼ⟩	t’ ⟨tʼ⟩	t͡s’ ⟨tz’⟩	t͡ʃ’ ⟨ch’⟩	k’ ⟨kʼ⟩	ʔ ⟨’⟩
Plosive/ Affricate	voiced	(b) ⟨b⟩	(d) ⟨d⟩			(g) ⟨g⟩	
Fricative				s ⟨s⟩	ʃ ⟨x⟩	x ~ h ⟨j⟩	
Approximant			l ⟨l⟩		j ⟨y⟩	w ⟨w⟩	
Trill			r ⟨r⟩				

- /ɓ/ is an implosive while /tʼ t͡sʼ t͡ʃʼ kʼ/ are ejectives.
- /b d ɡ/ usually only appear in Spanish loanwords.
- Classic Maya contrasted /x h/, but in Chʼortiʼ they are allophones. Some modern literature still differentiates them, e.g. the texts by Wisdom.

=== Vowels ===
	Front	Back
Close	i	u
Mid	e	o
Open	a	

The vowels consist of a, e, i, o, and u.

==== Vowel clusters ====
Characters used	Sometimes also used	IPA symbol	Chʼortiʼ pronunciation
aa	ā, aꞏ, a꞉	a	Like regular a but held longer
ee	ē, eꞏ, e꞉	e	Like e only held longer
ii	ī, iꞏ, i꞉	i	Like i only held longer
oo	ō, oꞏ, o꞉	o	Like o only held longer
uu	ū, uꞏ, u꞉	u	Like u only held longer

When two vowels are put together in Chʼortiʼ, the second vowel always takes precedence and then is always followed by a glottal stop. Chʼortiʼ does not have long vowels. According to historians, long vowels occur in Classical Mayan, but have been lost in modern Chʼortiʼ.

In Chʼortiʼ, aa or a꞉ is used as aʼ or Aʼ; this pattern occurs with all vowel clusters including eʼ, iʼ, oʼ and uʼ.

Some examples of words with vowel clusters are꞉

- Jaʼx [xaʔʃ] = Her, ella
- Weʼr [weʔr] = meat, carne
- Bʼiʼx [pʼiʔʃ] = seed, semilla
- Tunoʼron [tunoʔɾon] = everyone, todos
- Kuʼm [kuʔm] = egg, huevo

== Morphology ==
=== Verb inflection ===
Verb Inflections in Chʼortiʼ
		Ergative (Set A)	Absolutive (Set B)	Subjective (Set C)
1st person	singular	in-/ni-	-en	in-
1st person	plural	ka-	-on	ka-
2nd person	singular	a-	-et	i-
2nd person	plural	i-	-ox	ix-
3rd person	singular	u-	-Ø	a-
3rd person	plural	u-...-obʼ	-obʼ	aʼ...-obʼ

Examples of inflected verbs from Isidro González's stories (John Fought, 1972):

Verb Inflection Examples
Uninflected Verb	Inflected Verb
ixin "to go"	ixinobʼ go-3B.PL "they went"
ira “to see”	uwira 3A-see-3B “he sees it”
kojko “to guard”	ukojkobʼ 3A-guard-3B.PL “they guard over it”
ixin “to go”	aʼxin 3C-go “he goes”

==== Possessions ====
Tak is plural for women and children:

- ijchʼok-tak "little girls"
- max-tak "children, young ones, family" (max does not occur without -tak)
- ixik-tak "women"

These are the only instances encountered. It is worthy of notice that ixkaʼr "wife", chʼurkabʼ "baby" and ar "offspring" take -ob'.

obʼ is a general plural. The suffix can be found in nouns, verbs, adjectives, and participials.

Examples on possessives:

e mut-obʼ war u-bʼax-i-obʼ ni-jinaj
DEF.ART bird-3PL PROG {3A-pull up-THEM-3PL} {1A.SG-maize plant}
The birds are pulling my maize plant.

Yar-obʼ bʼikʼit ruch
small-3PL {small variety of} {gourd container}
And then come two little gourds,... (f330040)

== Syntax ==
The aspectual system of Chʼortiʼ language changed to a tripartite pronominal system which comes with different morphemes used for the subject of transitive verbs, the object of transitive verbs and the subject of intransitive completive verbs, and a third set of pronouns only used for the subject of incompletive intransitive verbs.

Chʼortiʼ tripartite pronominal system (data from Hull 2005)

e sitzʼ u-buyi-Ø e siʼ
DEF.ART boy 3A-chop-3B DEF.ART wood
'The boy chops the wood (into tiny pieces)'

intzaj lokʼoy-Ø e peʼych
sweet go.out-3B DEF.ART tomato
'The tomato turned out delicious'

e kʼin a-lokʼoy ta ixner kʼin
DEF.ART sun 3C-go.out PREP going sun
'The sun sets in the west'

=== Basic word order ===
In the Chʼortiʼ language and other Mayan languages, the word order is commonly represented by the acronym VOS, meaning verb-object-subject. VSO, SVO, SOV, OVS, and OSV are also used.

In most Chʼortiʼ phrases surrounding transitive verbs, the subject is first, followed by the verb and the object (SVO).

Uchoni {e kar} enoya
VERB OBJECT SUBJECT
sells vegetables grandma
"Grandma sells vegetables."

=== Adjectives with attributive function ===
The adjective works as a modifier. Together with the noun, it forms a noun phrase that plays some syntactic role (object etc.).

Predicative adjectives indicate the size, color or state:

{E bʼikʼit} yurwobʼ chamobʼ
ADJECTIVE NOUN VERB
{The little} chicks died

inchoni {e yaxax} pe'ych
VERB ADJECTIVE NOUN
{I am selling} green tomato

In the following sentence, the bold word is a preposition and the underlined one is a relational noun.

E chij numuy tu't e max-tak
The horse passed in.front.of the child-PL
"The horse passed in front of the children"

== Vocabulary ==
The following list contains examples of common words in the Chʼortiʼ language:

Common Words
English	Chʼortiʼ	English	Chʼortiʼ
big	nixiʼ	fire	kʼajkʼ
bird	mut	here	tara
cold	insis	what	tukʼa
dog	txʼiʼ	husband	noxibʼ
day	kʼin	man	winik'
beverage	uchʼe	moon	uj
earth	rum	mountain	witzir

According to "A Dictionary of Chʼortiʼ Maya, Guatemala" by Kerry Hull, some words may be used as nouns (as shown above) or can double as a verb as well. For example "Witzir" can mean mountain as a noun, or 'to go uphill' as a verb.
