= Santa Fe, Ocotepeque =

Santa Fe
- Municipality
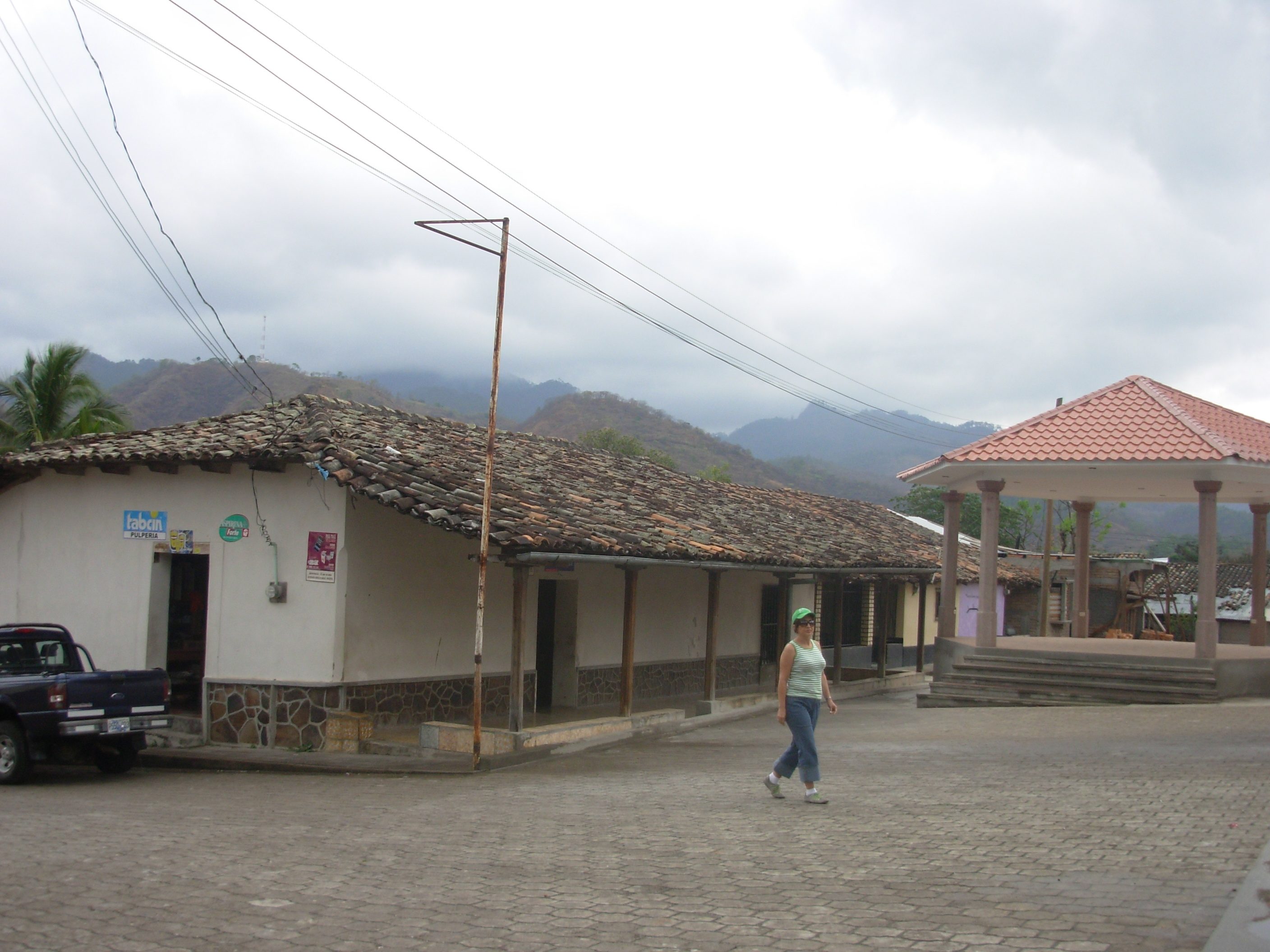
- View of town's center

- Location within Honduras
- Coordinates: 14°31′N 89°14′W
- Country: Honduras
- Department: Ocotepeque
- Villages: 8

Area
  - Total: 64.7 km^{2} (25.0 sq mi)
- Elevation: 819 m (2,687 ft)

Population (2015)
  - Total: 5,006
  - Density: 77.4/km^{2} (200/sq mi)

Santa Fe is a municipality in the Honduran department of Ocotepeque. As of 2015, its population was of 5,006.

== History ==
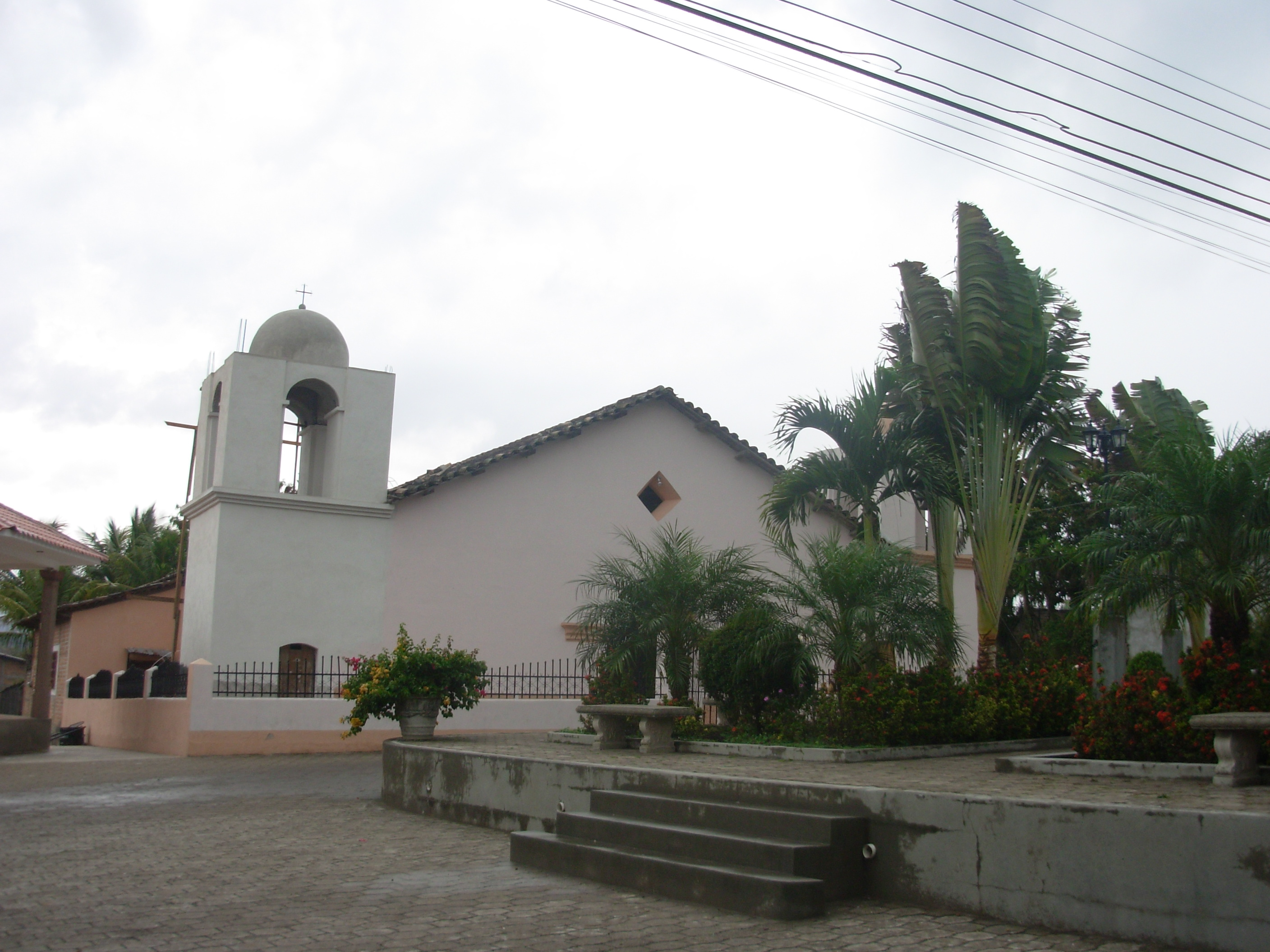
Village church and park

The village was founded in 1860 by people from the nearby town (4.5 km east) of Concepción. It was originally named El Tablón del Guayabo (The Board of Guayabo), due to the abundance of trees of this fruit, then changed its name to the current one Santa Fe (Holy Faith).

In 1887 population statistics Santa Fe was ranked as one of the municipalities forming the Ocotepeque Department.

== Geography ==
Located 11 km southeast of the border with Guatemala (at Agua Caliente), and 19 km north of the one with El Salvador (at Citalá), Santa Fe is a hilltown close to the banks of Lempa River. It is 12 km from Ocotepeque, the department capital, and 19 from the Guatemalan town of Esquipulas.

The municipality is divided into 8 parts: the town of Santa Fe and 7 other villages (Aldeas). The villages are Agua Caliente, El Mojanal, La Quesera, Los Encinos, Piedras Bonitas, Piñuelas and Sulnete.

== Demographics ==
At the time of the 2013 Honduras census, Santa Fe municipality had a population of 4,851. Of these, 97.40% were Mestizo, 0.80% Indigenous, 0.33% Black or Afro-Honduran, 0.16% White and 1.30% others.
