= Concepción Las Minas =

Municipality in Guatemala

Coordinates: 14°31′N 89°27′W

Concepción Las Minas (Spanish pronunciation: [konseβˈsjon las ˈminas]) is a municipality in southern Chiquimula department of Guatemala in Central America. It has a population of 11,693 (2018) and cover an area of 222 km^{2}.

== History ==
Concepción Las Minas was recognized as a municipality on 8 June 1893 by decree of President José María Reyna Barrios; however the current municipality and its boundaries was created on 17 April 1972. The municipality owes its double-barreled name to the local mines, where in colonial times lead, copper, iron and silver were extracted, and to the local church which is dedicated to the Virgin of the Conception. The municipal fiesta is held at the end of February and is in honor of the Virgin.

== Geography ==
Politically, the Concepción Las Minas municipality is bounded to the east by Honduras, to the south by El Salvador and to the west by the Jutiapa Department of Guatemala. It is only to the north that it is connected with the rest of Chiquimula Department, namely the municipalities of Quetzaltepeque to the north and Esquipulas to the northeast.

The municipality lies on the Montecristo Massif with its highest point being the Monte Cristo volcano, known as Trifino de Monte Cristo (2,194 metres (7,198 ft)) which Guatemala shares with El Salvador and Honduras. It has five mountain ranges and nineteen peaks. Most of the streams in the area, like the Rio Seco, are ephemeral; however, even though their flow is considerably diminished in the dry season the Rio Frio, the Rio Anguiatú and the Rio Grande de Zacapa do not go completely dry. Most of the former forested areas in the municipality have been converted to grasslands for cattle raising, but some forests remain, particularly at the higher elevations. The forests are mostly pine, with some mixed hardwoods. The only protected area is the Trifinio Biosphere Reserve, which is also known as the Biosfera de la Fraternidad.

== Economy ==
The municipality exports cattle and other livestock, but relies heavily on remittances from emigres in the United States.
