= C.S.D. Sacachispas =

Association football club in Guatemala

Sacachispas
- Full name: Club Social y Deportivo Sacachispas
- Nicknames: El Equipo de la "S" (The "S" Team); Los Muteros (The Muteros)
- Founded: June 15, 1949; 74 years ago
- Ground: Estadio Las Victorias
- Capacity: 10,000
- Chairman: Alexander Hernández
- Head Coach: Wilder Galicia
- League: Primera División
- Clausura 2024: Group B 4th (Knockout Phase)
Home colours	Away colours

Club Social y Deportivo Sacachispas is a professional football club based in Chiquimula, Guatemala. The team plays in the Primera División, the second tier of Guatemalan football.

Their home stadium is the Estadio Las Victorias.

The club has also played in the Liga Mayor, having reached their best position in the 1995–96 season, when they were runners-up. They have been playing in the second division since 2021.

== History ==
Nicknamed Los Muteros, the club was founded as a result of two meetings. The first, in the south-west corner of Ismael Cerna´s Park, was attended by the distinguished citizens Miguel Ángel Rodríguez, Josué Goshop, Héctor Antonio Monroy, Jorge González and Manuel Samayoa, on June 15, 1949; and the second meeting was near Colegio Amigos, where the Estadio Las Victorias now stands. Neftalí Aguilar, Caleb Goshop, Neco Velásquez, Enrique Valdés, Gata Cuellar, Ronald Williams, Mincho Paz, Lipe Franco, Quincho Díaz, Chentío Castañeda, Edmundo Rivera, Pío Martínez and Armando Portillo, and the people in the first meeting, were all at the second meeting.
The first uniform was a white jersey with white shorts. Their first coach was the Governor of Chiquimula, Colonel Guadalupe López Ochoa who got new uniforms: a white jersey with blue stripes, and white shorts.

=== The name ===
Many of the footballers had their headquarters in the Roxi barbershop, owned by Carlos Enrique Morales Hernández aka Quique. One night in a players' meeting, one customer who came from El Salvador told them about an Argentine movie showing in that country, Pelota de Trapo (Ball Rag). The movie was about a group of kids who play with the name Sacachispas. He suggested that name for the Chiquimula football team. That led to the current name of the Club Social y Deportivo Sacachispas.

== Current squad ==
Note: Flags indicate national team as defined under FIFA eligibility rules; some limited exceptions apply. Players may hold more than one non-FIFA nationality.

No.	Pos.	Nation	Player
1	GK	CHI	Claudio Santis
2	DF	GUA	Ricardo Blanco
3	DF	GUA	Brandon Yaquián
4	DF	GUA	Rolman Sandoval
6	DF	GUA	Luis Revolorio
9	FW	GUA	Kevin Bordón
10	FW	GUA	Andy Palencia
11	MF	CRC	José Sánchez

No.	Pos.	Nation	Player
16	DF	GUA	Abel Miranda
17	DF	GUA	Allan López
18	FW	COL	Juan Arizala
23	GK	GUA	Jonathan Reyes
27	MF	GUA	Luis Cos
91	MF	GUA	Kevin García
92	MF	GUA	Brolin Valdizón
99	FW	GUA	Kevin Macareño

== Notable former players ==
- (Guatemala) Yony Flores
- (Guatemala) Pablo Solórzano
- (Guatemala) Marco Rivas
- (Guatemala) Rigoberto Hernández
- (Brazil) Allan Kardeck
- (Ecuador) Diego Ávila
- (Argentina) Leandro Rodríguez
- (Mexico) Omar López
- (Uruguay) Dany González
- (Uruguay) Egidio Arévalo

== List of coaches ==
- (Chile) Sergio Pardo
- (Uruguay) Alejandro Larrea (2020–2021)
- (Argentina) Diego Cerruti (2021)
- (Guatemala) Wilder Galicia (2021– )

== Honours ==
=== National titles ===
- Liga Mayor B: 1

1992

- Segunda División: 2

1993
Torneo Clausura 2010

- Copa Amistad: 1

2007
