= Fraternidad =

Fraternidad may refer to:

- Fraternidad, Ocotepeque - a municipality in the Honduran department of Ocotepeque.
- Fraternidad Tigres - a football club from La Paz
- Copa Fraternidad - name from 1971 to 1983 of a defunct annual football competition held in Central America
- Fraternity - Fraternidad is Fraternity in Spanish

== See also ==
- List of fraternities and sororities in Puerto Rico
- List of Latino Greek Lettered Organizations
