= Las Victorias Stadium =

Stadium in Chiquimula, Guatemala

Coordinates: 14.7950799°N 89.5444°W

Estadio Las Victorias
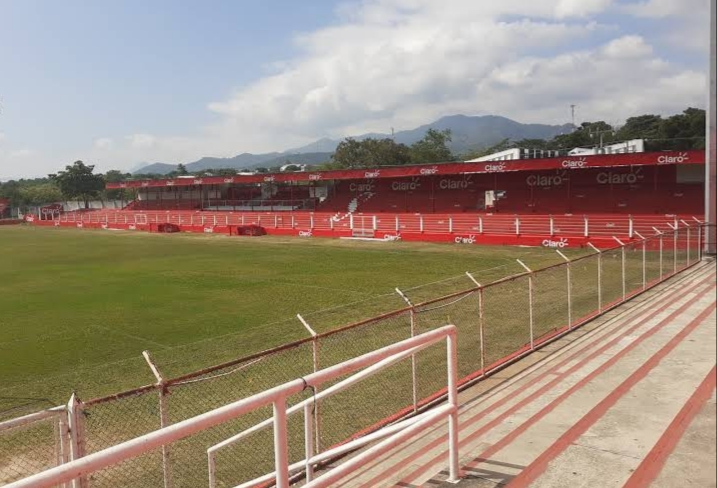
- Interactive map of Estadio Las Victorias
- Location: Chiquimula, Guatemala
- Owner: Corporación A.M.B Morales
- Capacity: 10,000
- Surface: Grass
- Field size: 104 m × 68 m (341 ft × 223 ft)

Construction
- Opened: 1954
- Renovated: 2020, 2025–present

Tenants
- C.S.D. Sacachispas (1954–present); CSD Zacapa (2023)

Las Victorias Stadium (Spanish: Estadio Las Victorias) is a football stadium located in Chiquimula, Guatemala. It is home to second division club Sacachispas, and has a capacity of 10,000. It is one of the few stadiums located in the department of Chiquimula.
