= San Fernando Municipality =

San Fernando Municipality may refer to:

== Colombia ==
- San Fernando, Bolívar

== El Salvador ==
- San Fernando, Chalatenango
- San Fernando, Morazán

== Honduras ==
- San Fernando, Ocotepeque

== Mexico ==
- San Fernando Municipality, Tamaulipas

== Nicaragua ==
- San Fernando, Nueva Segovia

== Philippines ==
- San Fernando, Cebu
- San Fernando, Masbate

== Venezuela ==
- San Fernando Municipality, Apure
