= San Francisco del Valle =

- Municipality
- Location within Honduras
- Coordinates: 14°26′N 88°57′W
- Country: Honduras
- Department: Ocotepeque
- Villages: 6

Area
  - Total: 109.51 km^{2} (42.28 sq mi)

Population (2015)
  - Total: 9,839
  - Density: 89.85/km^{2} (232.7/sq mi)

San Francisco del Valle is a municipality in the Honduran department of Ocotepeque.

== Demographics ==
At the time of the 2013 Honduras census, San Francisco del Valle municipality had a population of 9,625. Of these, 86.61% were Mestizo, 10.00% White, 2.68% Indigenous (2.46% Chʼortiʼ), 0.58% Black or Afro-Honduran and 0.14% others.
