= Nueva Ocotepeque Airport =

- IATA: none; ICAO: MHNV

Summary
- Airport type: Public
- Serves: Nueva Ocotepeque
- Elevation AMSL: 2,789 ft / 850 m
- Coordinates: 14°25′50″N 89°11′40″W

Map
- Location of the airport in Honduras

Runways
Direction	Length		Surface
Direction	m	ft	Surface
18/36	670	2,198	Grass
- Sources: GCM Google Maps SkyVector

Nueva Ocotepeque Airport (ICAO: MHNV) is an airport serving the town of Nueva Ocotepeque in Ocotepeque Department, Honduras. Nueva Ocotepeque is in a north-south valley 5 kilometres (3.1 mi) north of the El Salvador border, and 13 kilometres (8.1 mi) east of the Guatemala border.

The runway is on the west end of the town. The north 140 metres (460 ft) of the runway have trees encroaching on the east side. There is high terrain east through southeast of the airport, and rising terrain in other quadrants.

The Ilopango VOR-DME (Ident: YSV) is located 44.6 nautical miles (82.6 km) south of the airport.

== See also ==
- Transport in Honduras
- List of airports in Honduras
