= San Jorge, Honduras =

San Jorge
- Municipality
- Location within Honduras
- Coordinates: 14°39′N 89°8′W
- Country: Honduras
- Department: Ocotepeque
- Villages: 7

Area
  - Total: 61.03 km^{2} (23.56 sq mi)

Population (2015)
  - Total: 5,181
  - Density: 84.89/km^{2} (219.9/sq mi)

San Jorge is a municipality in the Honduran department of Ocotepeque.

== Demographics ==
At the time of the 2013 Honduras census, San Jorge municipality had a population of 5,037. Of these, 97.08% were Mestizo, 1.39% Indigenous (0.89% Lenca, 0.42% Chʼortiʼ), 1.31% Black or Afro-Honduran and 0.22% White.
