= La Labor =

- Municipality
- Location within Honduras
- Coordinates: 14°29′10″N 89°00′04″W
- Country: Honduras
- Department: Ocotepeque
- Villages: 8

Area
  - Total: 103.77 km^{2} (40.07 sq mi)

Population (2015)
  - Total: 9,838
  - Density: 94.81/km^{2} (245.5/sq mi)

La Labor is a municipality in the Honduran department of Ocotepeque.

It is one of five municipalities within the Mancomunidad Guisayote (http://www.mancomunidadguisayote.hn/).

== Demographics ==
At the 2013 Honduras census, La Labor municipality had a population of 9,515. Of these, 99.25% were Mestizo, 0.43% Indigenous, 0.24% Black or Afro-Honduran, 0.06% White and 0.01% others.
