= Ipala, Guatemala =

Ipala
- Municipality
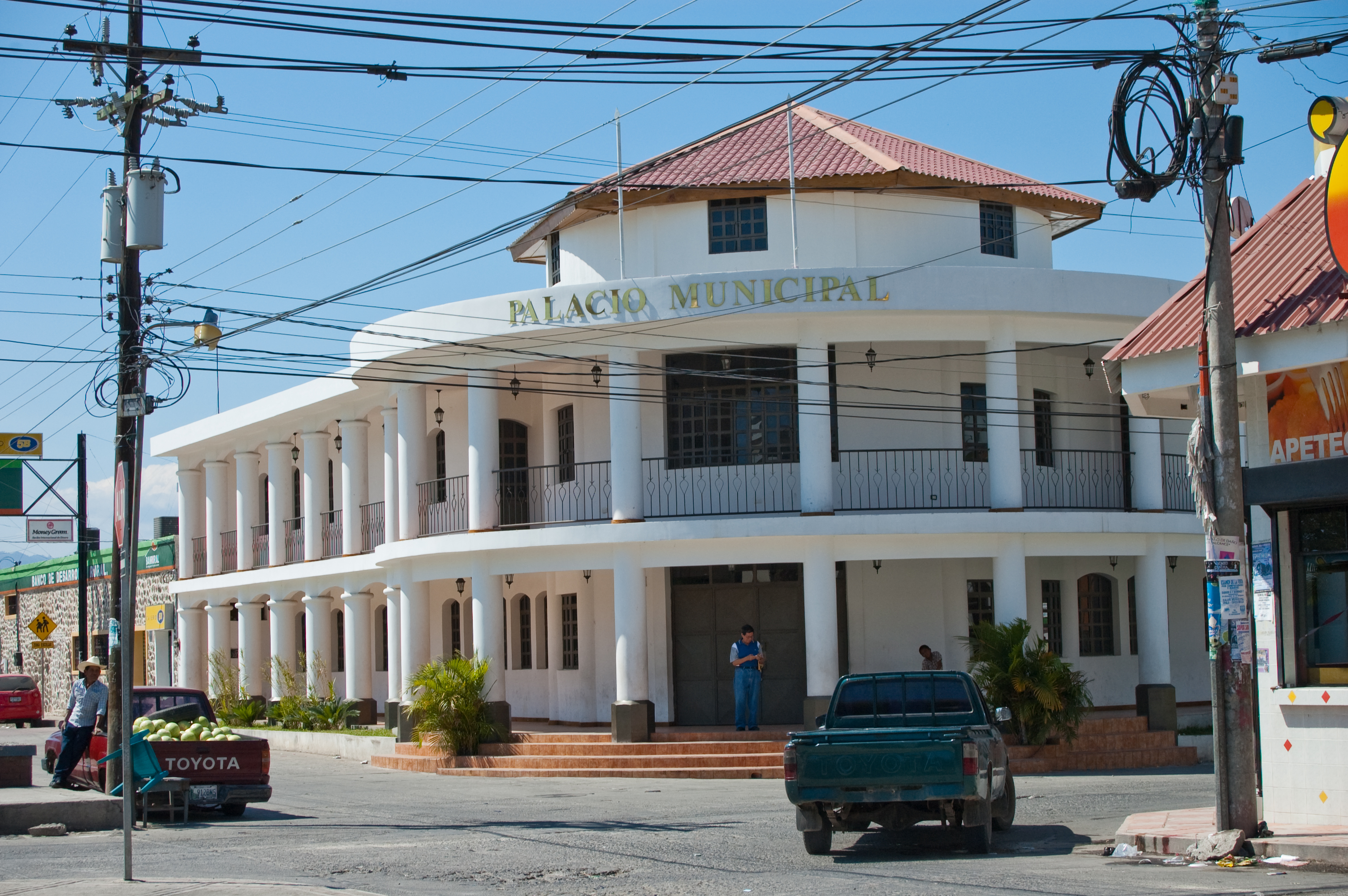
- Town hall

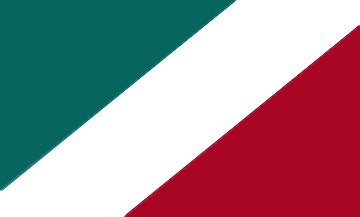
- Flag

- Location in Guatemala
- Coordinates: 14°37′N 89°37′W
- Country: Guatemala
- Department: Chiquimula

Area
  - Municipality: 94 sq mi (243 km^{2})

Population (2018 census)
  - Municipality: 22,413
  - Density: 239/sq mi (92.2/km^{2})
  - Urban: 5,932
- Climate: Aw

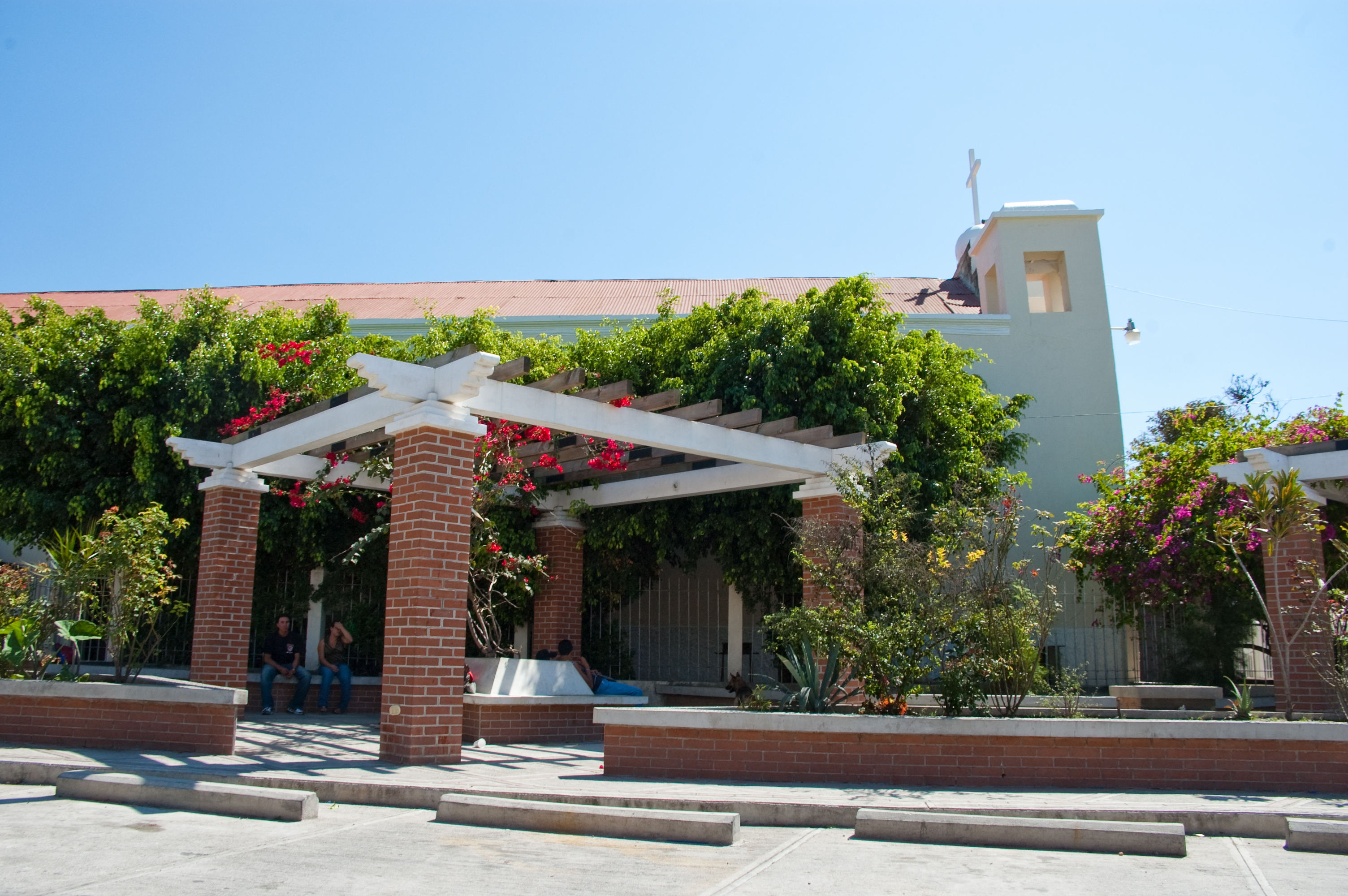
Little Park Ipala

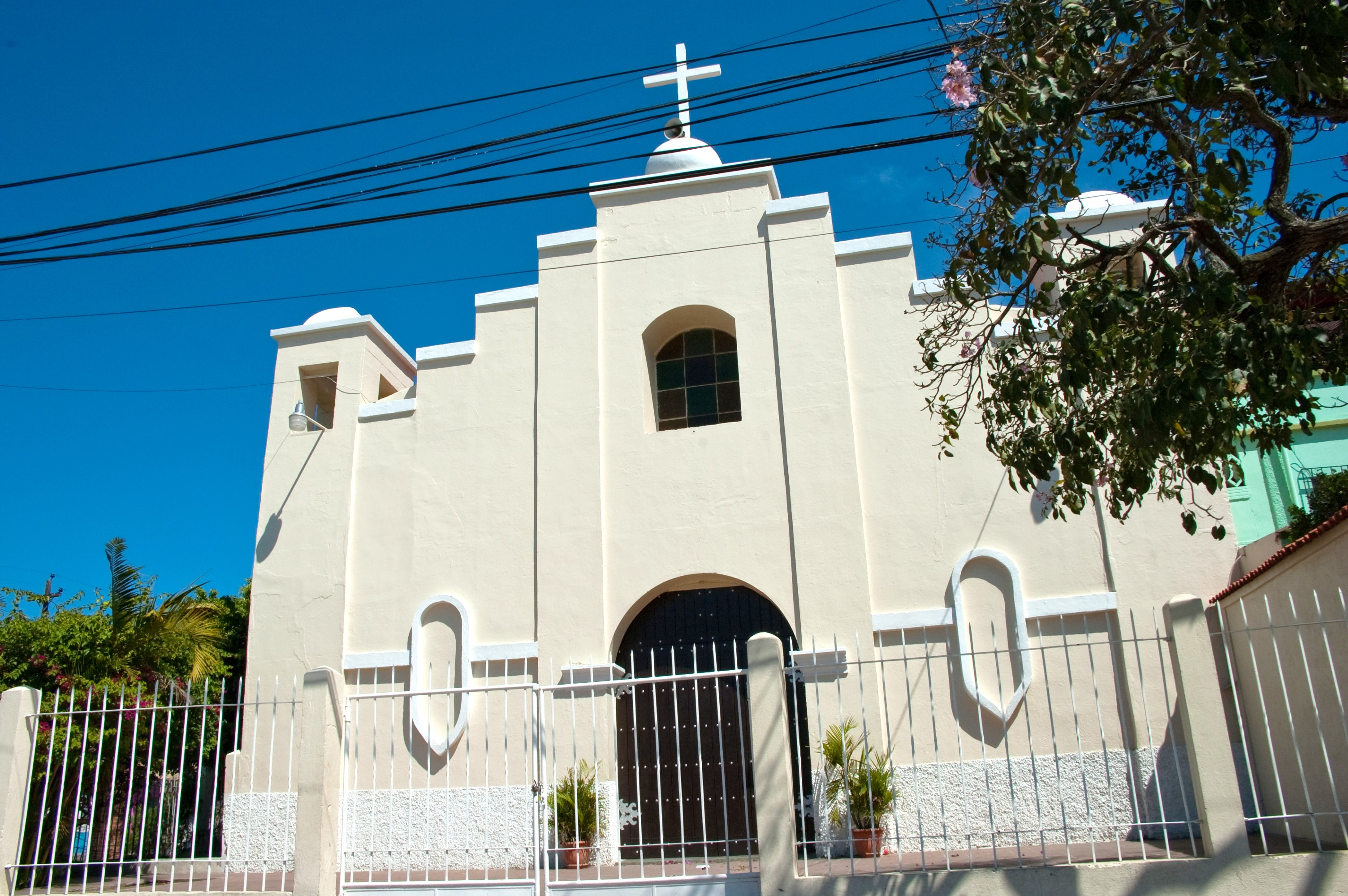
Catholic Church

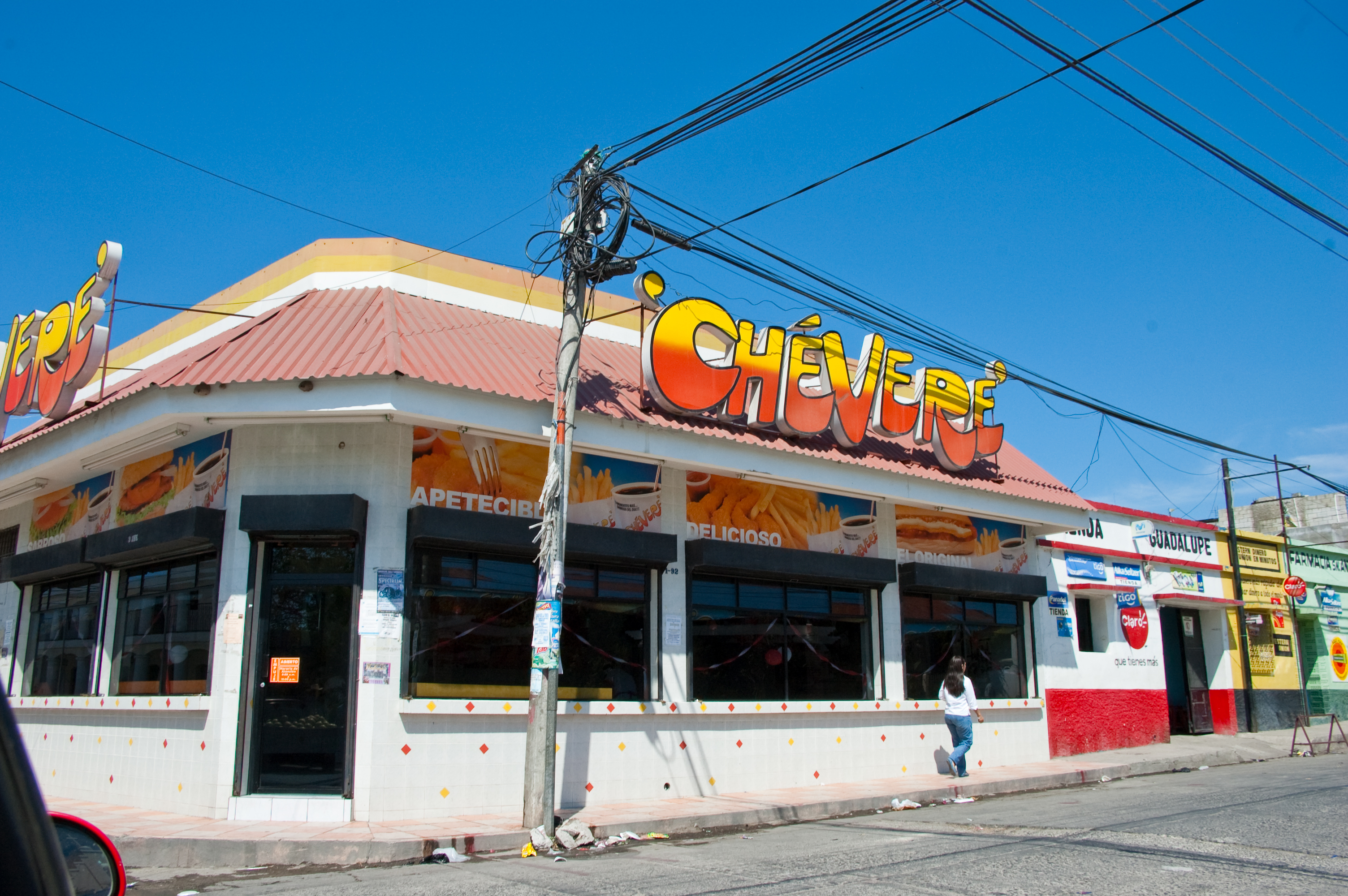
Chévere Hotdogs

Ipala is a town and municipality in the Chiquimula department of Guatemala.

== Geography ==
Ipala is a 30-minute microbus ride from Chiquimula headed south towards Jutiapa. Roughly 3 kilometers from the base of the volcano, the land is full of lava rock and cacti. There are several "aldeas" that surround Ipala, and the residents from them gather every Sunday in the city center for market day.

== Economy ==
Economically speaking, Ipala is mostly agricultural. The harvest (la cosecha) is an important event, and most families plant corn and beans for own consume and trade. Inside Ipala, there are several neighborhoods (barrios) including El Maestro, El Suyate, and La Cruzita. There is one main street (la calle principal) which is lined with restaurants, clothing stores and jewelry shops. The people of Ipala are camperos and ladinos. Unlike Northern Guatemala, where the indigenous population speaks many dialects, in Ipala only Spanish is spoken.

== Education ==
There are two public schools, going from kindergarten until 6th grade. Another public school well known as "INEBI" gives education from 7th grade until the 9th; at the morning shift while in the afternoon this school becomes as "ICOMA" that brings education for students involved in "Magisterio in education" ( students who studying to be a teacher). Although, the second public school is called "Colegio Proyeccion" which is based in the afternoon and night shifts for "Magisterio" as well. There are 3 private middle schools and High schools, the three of them in the morning shift as middle schools, and the afternoon as high schools, these schools are "Colegio Sinai, Colegio Católico, and Colegio Ipalteco."

Also Ipala have active youth schooling groups that get involved in sports and help the community; they have been known as "La tortilla tieza" and "Los monquis." both groups have been active since 2002- to present, however many members have had to leave this groups because they have travel to other cities, or counties. The members who are left also created the most recent group called "Rosario Central" who nowadays, are the ones with more activity.

== Tourism ==
While visiting Ipala, check out "La Posa de la Pila", which is a bathing area in the river approximately 1 kilometer south of the fork in the road. Safe food and water can be found at any "tienda", and there is a Chévere, which is a hamburger joint across from the Catholic Church. Another place very famous the community of Guatemala visit as tour is the "Ipala Volcano" which is approximatively 5 kilometers away from the main Ipala town. The volcano has a 1,000 metres (3,300 ft) and is famous for its wide summit crater which contains a crater lake called "La laguna del volcan de Ipala." Many neighborhoods also travel to Ipala, for the traditional and annual "Feria" that it has many unique activities for a long as one week, the main day is January 23 but usually it starts on January 21.

== Sport ==
The town of Ipala has a variety of sports that many residents practice. Soccer is the main one, which it has an inter-community major league, following for Basketball, volleyball and others.

== Twin towns ==
- Ipala has an active sister-city program with Riverdale Park, Maryland, United States
- In July 2009, five teachers from Prince George's County visited Ipala, taught English, and trained English as a Second Language teachers in the municipality. The program has continued each summer since 2009.
