= San Jacinto, Chiquimula =

Municipality in Guatemala

Coordinates: 14°40′N 89°30′W

San Jacinto (Spanish pronunciation: [saŋ xaˈsinto]) is a municipality, in the Chiquimula department of Guatemala. It has a population of 12,619 (2018 census) and cover an area of 72 km^{2}.
