= Yony Flores =

Guatemalan footballer (born 1983)

Personal information
- Full name: Yony Wilson Flores Monroy
- Date of birth: 16 February 1983 (age 43)
- Place of birth: Chiquimula, Guatemala
- Height: 1.75 m (5 ft 9 in)
- Position: Defender

Senior career*
Years	Team	Apps	(Gls)
- Sacachispas
2004–2009	Deportivo Marquense	70	(3)
2009–2012	CSD Municipal	0	(0)

International career^{‡}
2007–2012	Guatemala	21	(1)
- * Club domestic league appearances and goals as of 31 December 2006 ‡ National team caps and goals as of 4 September 2010

Yony Wilson Flores Monroy (born 16 February 1983) is a Guatemalan former professional footballer who played as a defender.

== Club career ==
Flores started his career at Sacachispas. He joined Deportivo Marquense before signing up for CSD Municipal on 16 June 2009.

=== Match fixing allegations and suspension ===
On 27 May 2012 Flores was separated from the Guatemala National Team on basis of suspected to arrange a match result of Guatemala against South Africa in 2010. In June 2012, this was confirmed by teammates, Luis Rodriguez and Carlos Ruiz.

Flores, along with Guillermo Ramirez and Gustavo Adolfo Cabrera, was found guilty by the National Football Federation of Guatemala in September 2012 of conspiring to fix a pair of national team exhibitions and a CONCACAF Champions League game between CSD Municipal and Mexico's Santos Laguna. The trio played together at Municipal in the fall of 2010, when the club finished behind Santos and the Columbus Crew in its first-round group.

Banned from the sport inside their native country, the players saw their exile extended worldwide on Wednesday.

== International career ==
Flores made his debut for Guatemala in a February 2007 UNCAF Nations Cup match against El Salvador and, as of January 2010, earned 20 caps, scoring no goals, including seven qualifying matches for the 2010 FIFA World Cup. He was part of the squad for the 2007 CONCACAF Gold Cup, but did not make any appearances. In 2011, Flores scored a goal in a 2014 FIFA World Cup qualification match against Saint Vincent and the Grenadines

=== International goals ===
#	Date	Venue	Opponent	Score	Result	Competition
1	2 September 2011	Guatemala City	Saint Vincent and the Grenadines	4-0	Win	2014 FIFA World Cup qualification (CONCACAF)

== Personal life ==
Flores is married to Johanna de Flores and they have a daughter named Catherine.
