= San José La Arada =

Coordinates: 14°43′N 89°35′W

San José La Arada

San José La Arada (Spanish pronunciation: [saŋ xoˈse la aɾaða]) is a municipality in the Chiquimula department of Guatemala. It has a population of 8,756 (2018 census) and covers an area of 121 km^{2}.
