= Dolores Merendón =

- Municipality
- Location within Honduras
- Coordinates: 14°32′N 89°07′W
- Country: Honduras
- Department: Ocotepeque
- Villages: 2

Area
  - Total: 44.43 km^{2} (17.15 sq mi)

Population (2015)
  - Total: 3,997
  - Density: 89.96/km^{2} (233.0/sq mi)

Dolores Merendón is a municipality in the Honduran department of Ocotepeque.

== Demographics ==
At the time of the 2013 Honduras census, Dolores Merendón municipality had a population of 3,742. Of these, 99.65% were Mestizo, 0.21% Black or Afro-Honduran and 0.13% White.
