= La Encarnación =

- Municipality
- Location within Honduras
- Coordinates: 14°40′N 89°05′W
- Country: Honduras
- Department: Ocotepeque
- Villages: 6

Area
  - Total: 35 km^{2} (14 sq mi)

Population (2001)
  - Total: 5,136
  - Density: 150/km^{2} (380/sq mi)

La Encarnación (Spanish pronunciation: [la eŋkaɾnaˈsjon]) is a municipality in the Honduran department of Ocotepeque.

== Demographics ==
At the time of the 2013 Honduras census, La Encarnación municipality had a population of 4,961. Of these, 95.62% were Mestizo, 2.24% White, 0.85% Indigenous, 0.06% Black or Afro-Honduran and 1.23% others.
