= Belén Gualcho =

- Municipality
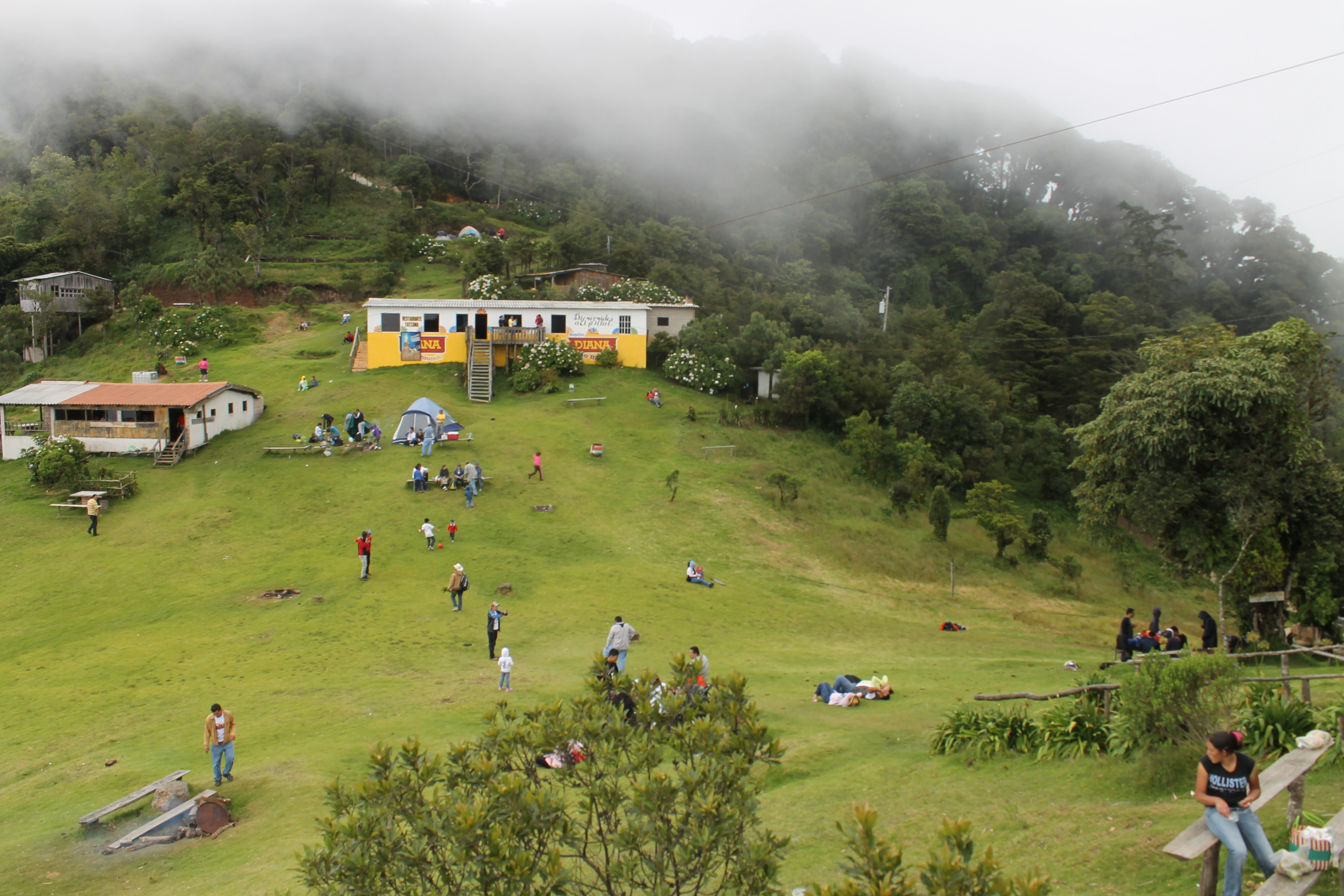

- Location within Honduras
- Coordinates: 14°29′N 88°48′W
- Country: Honduras
- Department: Ocotepeque
- Villages: 16
- Founded: 1715

Area
  - Total: 156.93 km^{2} (60.59 sq mi)
- Elevation: 1,800 m (5,900 ft)

Population (2015)
  - Total: 15,983
  - Density: 101.85/km^{2} (263.78/sq mi)
- Climate: Cfb

Belén Gualcho is a municipality in the Honduran department of Ocotepeque. This small village founded in 1715 is a jewel in the middle of the Honduran mountains, located in the department of Ocotepeque and close to Gracias and San Sebastian to the south. The highlights of the village are the colonial Church of La Trinidad and Sunday Market where the Lenca people come to sale and get basic supplies. In 1871, it was listed as the head of the Curato de Gualcho, later it was called Belén de Copán or Belén de Occidente; on September 2, 1907, it became part of the Ocotepeque Department, calling it Belén de Ocotepeque and on February 15, 1922 it was called Belén Gualcho, belonging to the Sensenti district. Its name according to the Mexica spelling means "House of the oaks", and in Lenca language it means "Place of many waters"

== Demographics ==
At the time of the 2013 Honduras census, Belén Gualcho municipality had a population of 15,438. Of these, 87.50% were Indigenous (87.12% Lenca), 12.40% Mestizo, 0.07% Black or Afro-Honduran and 0.03% White.
