= Lucerna, Honduras =

Lucerna
- Municipality
- Location within Honduras
- Coordinates: 14°33′N 88°56′W
- Country: Honduras
- Department: Ocotepeque
- Villages: 4

Area
  - Total: 119.46 km^{2} (46.12 sq mi)

Population (2015)
  - Total: 6,009
  - Density: 50.30/km^{2} (130.3/sq mi)

Lucerna (Spanish pronunciation: [luˈseɾna]) is a municipality in the Honduran department of Ocotepeque.

== Demographics ==
At the time of the 2013 Honduras census, Lucerna municipality had a population of 5,861. Of these, 99.76% were Mestizo, 0.14% Indigenous, 0.05% White and 0.05% Black or Afro-Honduran.
