= Mercedes, Honduras =

Mercedes
- Municipality
- Location within Honduras
- Coordinates: 14°19′N 88°59′W
- Country: Honduras
- Department: Ocotepeque
- Villages: 10

Area
  - Total: 96.08 km^{2} (37.10 sq mi)

Population (2015)
  - Total: 7,355
  - Density: 76.55/km^{2} (198.3/sq mi)

Mercedes (Spanish pronunciation: [meɾˈseðes]) is a municipality in the Honduran department of Ocotepeque.

== Toponymy ==
The municipality was named after Virgen de las Mercedes, a Catholic Church saint.

== Demographics ==
At the time of the 2013 Honduras census, Mercedes municipality had a population of 7,226. Of these, 99.32% were Mestizo, 0.30% Indigenous, 0.30% Black or Afro-Honduran and 0.06% White.
