= Ismael Cerna =

Guatemalan poet

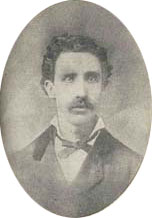

Ismael Cerna (1856–1901) was a Guatemalan poet.

== Biography ==
Cerna was born in Chiquimula in 1856. He graduated as a Bachelor of Philosophy and later in medicine and law. He later joined the army but after the fall of Vicente Cerna was captured with his uncle and imprisoned. On his release he went to El Salvador in exile. On his return in 1884 he was imprisoned again in Guatemala, during which he wrote a great deal. Before his death a number of his works were published and have national significance in Guatemala. Notable poems include A Justo Refino Barrios, Ante la tumba de Barrios and A Guatemala.

There is a park dedicated to him in Chiquimula.
