= Sinuapa =

- Municipality
- Location within Honduras
- Coordinates: 14°27′N 89°11′W
- Country: Honduras
- Department: Ocotepeque
- Villages: 11

Area
  - Total: 131.1 km^{2} (50.6 sq mi)

Population (2015)
  - Total: 9,145
  - Density: 69.76/km^{2} (180.7/sq mi)

Sinuapa is a municipality in the Honduran department of Ocotepeque. Sinuapa means: Water of Canary in Nahuatl.

== Demographics ==
At the time of the 2013 Honduras census, Sinuapa municipality had a population of 8,735. Of these, 91.05% were Mestizo, 6.91% White, 1.10% Black or Afro-Honduran, 0.87% Indigenous and 0.07% others.
