= Fraternidad, Honduras =

Fraternidad
- Municipality
- Location within Honduras
- Coordinates: 14°32′N 89°5′W
- Country: Honduras
- Department: Ocotepeque
- Villages: 4

Area
  - Total: 85.48 km^{2} (33.00 sq mi)

Population (2015)
  - Total: 5,445
  - Density: 63.70/km^{2} (165.0/sq mi)

Fraternidad (Spanish pronunciation: [fɾateɾniˈðað]) is a municipality in the Honduran department of Ocotepeque.

== Demographics ==
At the time of the 2013 Honduras census, Fraternidad municipality had a population of 4,890. Of these, 99.59% were Mestizo, 0.25% Indigenous, 0.08% White and 0.08% Black or Afro-Honduran.
