= San Fernando, Honduras =

San Fernando
- Municipality
- Location within Honduras
- Coordinates: 14°41′N 89°7′W
- Country: Honduras
- Department: Ocotepeque
- Villages: 9

Area
  - Total: 48.56 km^{2} (18.75 sq mi)

Population (2015)
  - Total: 7,067
  - Density: 145.5/km^{2} (376.9/sq mi)

San Fernando is a municipality in the Honduran department of Ocotepeque.

== Demographics ==
At the time of the 2013 Honduras census, San Fernando municipality had a population of 6,948. Of these, 99.38% were Mestizo, 0.30% Indigenous, 0.19% Black or Afro-Honduran and 0.13% White.
