= San Juan Ermita =

Coordinates: 14°46′N 89°26′W

San Juan Ermita is a municipality in the Chiquimula department of Guatemala. It has a population of 16,418 (2018 census) and cover an area of 80.5 km^{2}.
