= Concepción, Ocotepeque =

Concepción
- Municipality
- Location within Honduras
- Coordinates: 14°30′N 89°13′W
- Country: Honduras
- Department: Ocotepeque
- Villages: 4

Area
  - Total: 116.16 km^{2} (44.85 sq mi)

Population (2015)
  - Total: 5,249
  - Density: 45.19/km^{2} (117.0/sq mi)

Concepción (Spanish pronunciation: [konseβˈsjon]) is a municipality in the Honduran department of Ocotepeque.

== Demographics ==
At the time of the 2013 Honduras census, Concepción municipality had a population of 5,074. Of these, 98.40% were Mestizo, 1.03% Indigenous (0.61% Lenca), 0.37% White and 0.20% Black or Afro-Honduran.
