= Chiquimula =

- Municipality
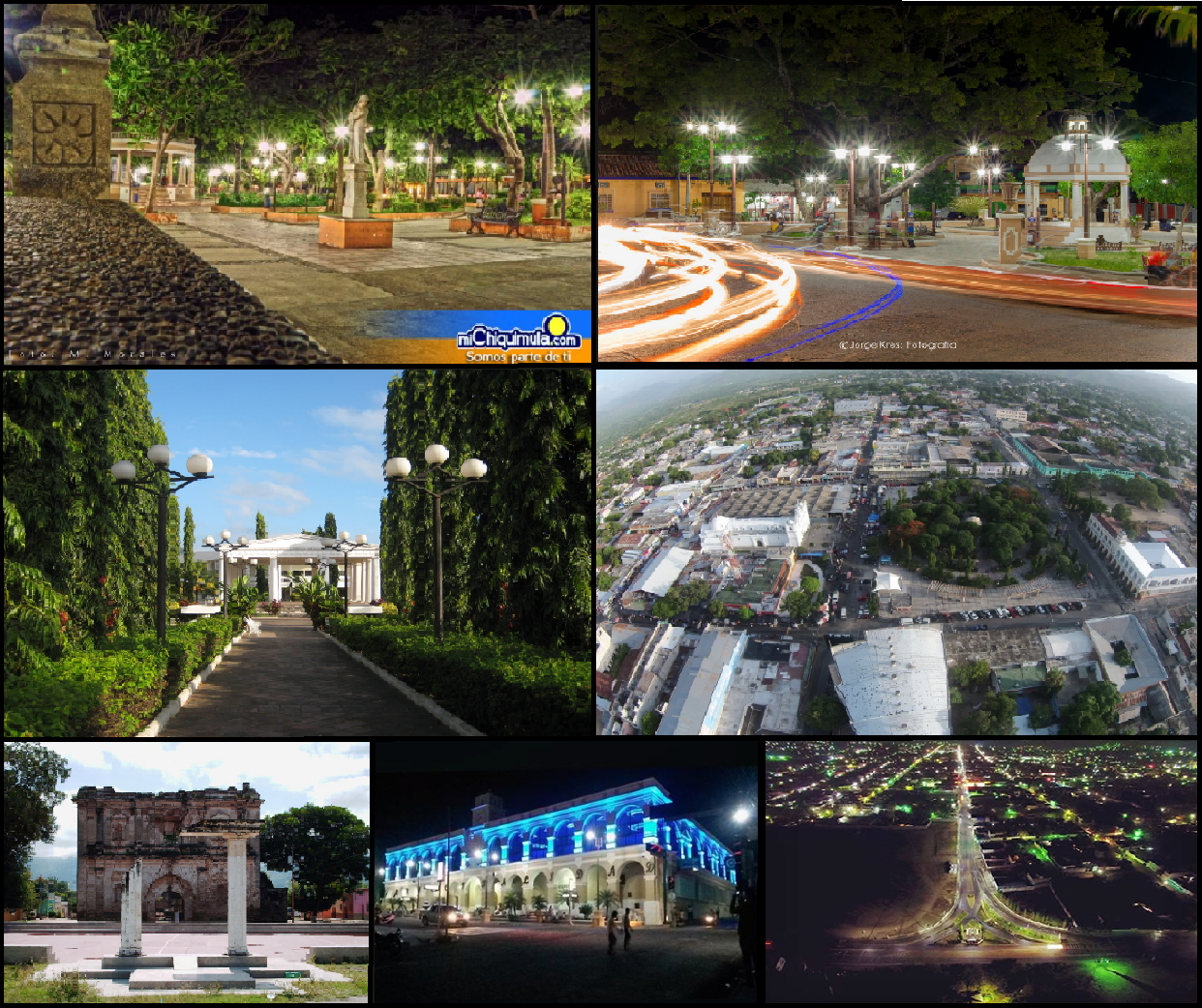

- Flag Seal
- Motto: La Perla de Oriente
- Location in Guatemala
- Coordinates: 14°47′N 89°32′W
- Country: Guatemala
- Department: Chiquimula
- Foundation: 1530
- Established as city: June 29, 1821

Government
  - Mayor: José René Pinto España (VAMOS)

Area
  - Municipality: 368 km^{2} (142 sq mi)
- Elevation: 423.86 m (1,390.6 ft)

Population (census 2018)
  - Municipality: 111,505
  - Density: 303/km^{2} (785/sq mi)
  - Urban: 111,505
- Time zone: UTC-6 (Central Standard Time)
- Climate: BSh
- Website: www.chiquimulaonline.com

Chiquimula is a city in Guatemala. It is the capital of the department of Chiquimula and the municipal seat for the surrounding municipality of the same name. It is located some 174 km from Guatemala City and within Guatemala known as "La perla del oriente" (the pearl of the east).

== History ==
In 1851, during the Battle of La Arada Guatemalan military won over El Salvador and Honduras military forces, which is why Chiquimula was named "Ciudad Procer" Hero City.

== Population ==
Chiquimula is the most populous city of eastern Guatemala. The official population of the city was 37,602, according to the 2002 census. As of 2018 the population had increased to 111,505.

== Sports ==
Sacachispas football club play in the Liga Nacional de Guatemala, they top-highest football division in Guatemala. Their home stadium is the Estadio Las Victorias.

The club has also played in the Liga Mayor, having reached their best position in the 1995–96 season, when they were runners-up. They have been playing in the second division since 2000.

== Notable people ==
- Ismael Cerna (1856–1901), poet
- Yony Flores (born 1983), footballer
