= Ocotepeque Department =

Ocotepeque Department Departamento de Ocotepeque
- Department
- Flag

- Location of Ocotepeque in Honduras
- Coordinates: 14°26′N 89°11′W
- Country: Honduras
- Municipalities: 16
- Villages: 126
- Founded: 17 February 1906
- Capital city: Nueva Ocotepeque

Government
  - Type: Departmental
  - Governor: Edgardo Villanueva (2022-2026) (LibRe)

Area
  - Total: 1,636 km^{2} (632 sq mi)

Population (2015)
  - Total: 151,516
  - Density: 92.61/km^{2} (239.9/sq mi)

GDP (Nominal, 2015 US dollar)
  - Total: $500 million (2023)
  - Per capita: $2,500 (2023)

GDP (PPP, 2015 int. dollar)
  - Total: $1.0 billion (2023)
  - Per capita: $5,300 (2023)
- Time zone: UTC-6 (CDT)
- Postal code: 43101, 43201
- ISO 3166 code: HN-OC
- HDI (2021): 0.589 medium · 10th of 18
- Statistics derived from Consult INE online database: Population and Housing Census 2013

Ocotepeque is one of the 18 departments of Honduras, Central America, located in the West and bordering both El Salvador and Guatemala. It was formed in 1906 from part of Copán department. The capital and main city is Nueva Ocotepeque, which was founded after the previous capital of Ocotepeque was destroyed by a landslide.

The department covers a total surface area of 1,630 km^{2} (630 sq mi) and, in 2015, had an estimated population of 151,516.

== History ==
Historical records and onomastics suggest that the Ocotepeque valley in the sixteenth century was mainly inhabited by the Pipil along with Chʼortiʼ and Lenca minorities, whereas in the Sensenti valley the Lenca seem to have been the main inhabitants.

== Municipalities ==
1. Belén Gualcho
2. Concepción
3. Dolores Merendón
4. Fraternidad
5. La Encarnación
6. La Labor
7. Lucerna
8. Mercedes
9. Ocotepeque
10. San Fernando
11. San Francisco del Valle
12. San Jorge
13. San Marcos
14. Santa Fe
15. Sensenti
16. Sinuapa
