= Nueva Ocotepeque =

City in Honduras

Coordinates: 14°26′N 89°11′W

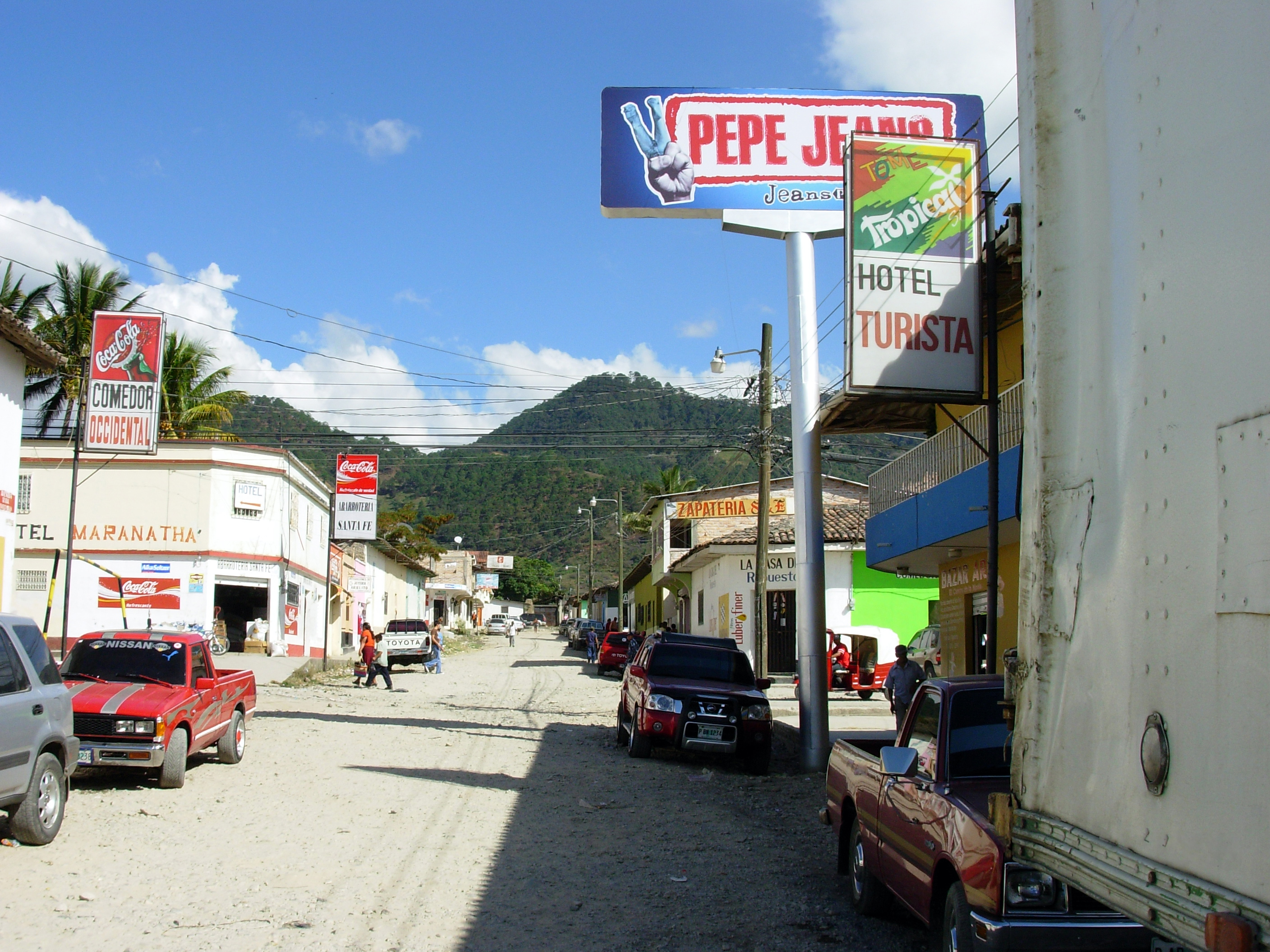
Commercial zone

Nueva Ocotepeque, with a population of 14,900 (2023 calculation), is the capital of the Ocotepeque Department of Honduras. It is situated in the north-south valley of the Lempa River, 5 kilometres (3.1 mi) north of the El Salvador border, and 13 kilometres (8.1 mi) east of the Guatemala border.

Nueva Ocotopeque was settled in 1935 after the site of the former town of Ocotepeque was destroyed by flooding of the river. It was briefly occupied by El Salvador during the Football War.

It is served by Nueva Ocotepeque Airport.

== Education ==
My Little Red House Bilingual School, K-8.
