= Camotán =

- Municipality
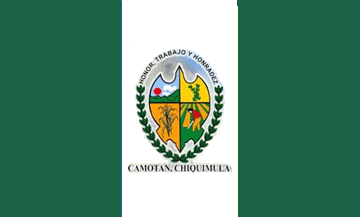
- Flag
- Nickname: Perla De Oriente Camoteca
- Location within Guatemala
- Coordinates: 14°49′0″N 89°22′54″W
- Country: Guatemala
- Department: Chiquimula

Government
  - Type: Municipal
  - Mayor (2020-2024): Noé Guerra

Area
  - Total: 237 km^{2} (92 sq mi)

Population (2018 census)
  - Total: 56,138
  - Density: 237/km^{2} (613/sq mi)
- Time zone: UTC-6 (Central (CST))
  - Summer (DST): UTC-5 (CDT)
- Climate: Aw

Camotán is a municipality in the Chiquimula department of Guatemala.

== History ==
=== 2001 famine ===
«If 80% of the population in Guatemala lives in poverty, with that percent, I do not know what is the big fuss about this famine.

— President Alfonso Portillo, 2001
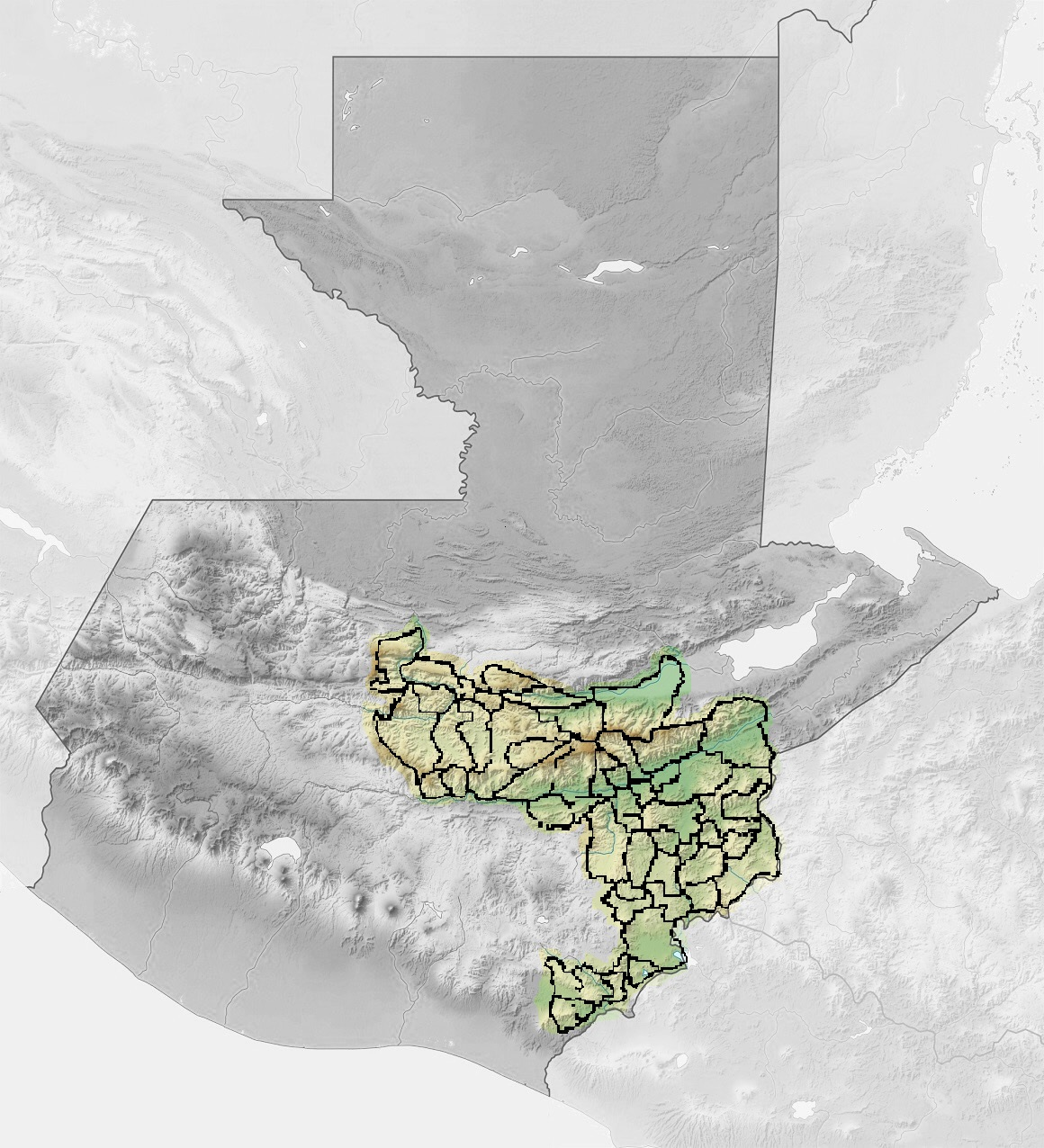
Camotán location in the Corredor Seco (English: Dry Corridor) in Guatemala

On 3 August 2001, Camotán municipality declared yellow code in the area when it learned about the desperate situation that the rural communities were facing imminent famine; the root cause of the crisis were the short raining season, and the decline in the international coffee price. Alfonso Portillo's government decreed State of Calamity to get international help; officially, 48 deceased were reported, but there were rumors of hundreds of casualties.

In March 2022, the Catholic church in the town of Camotan burnt down because lightning stroke it after a severe rainstorm, and the town mayor, Noe Guerra asked for national refund help to rebuild the church, there is no further notice about the plan.

== Population ==
Total population as of 2002 was 35,263, living in 6,479 homes.

Camotán villages by population
Village	Population	Village	Population
Lelá Chancó	2272	Tesoro	2051
El Guayabo	1804	Rodeo	1721
Nearar	1682	Tisipe	1557
El Volcán	1549	El Limón	1544
Shalaguá	1529	Lantiquin	1453
Shupá	1388	Lelá Obraje	1337
Guior	1167	Pajcó	1154

== Climate ==
Camotán has a tropical savanna climate (Köppen: Aw).

Climate data for Camotán (1991–2020)
Month	Jan	Feb	Mar	Apr	May	Jun	Jul	Aug	Sep	Oct	Nov	Dec	Year
Record high °C (°F)	38.2 (100.8)	41.1 (106.0)	42.2 (108.0)	43.2 (109.8)	42.2 (108.0)	41.5 (106.7)	37.4 (99.3)	37.8 (100.0)	40.0 (104.0)	37.0 (98.6)	36.2 (97.2)	37.6 (99.7)	43.2 (109.8)
Mean daily maximum °C (°F)	29.4 (84.9)	31.5 (88.7)	33.7 (92.7)	35.7 (96.3)	35.1 (95.2)	33.2 (91.8)	32.3 (90.1)	33.0 (91.4)	32.3 (90.1)	30.9 (87.6)	29.2 (84.6)	29.0 (84.2)	32.1 (89.8)
Daily mean °C (°F)	23.6 (74.5)	25.0 (77.0)	26.5 (79.7)	28.4 (83.1)	28.3 (82.9)	27.0 (80.6)	26.7 (80.1)	26.7 (80.1)	26.3 (79.3)	25.4 (77.7)	24.1 (75.4)	23.6 (74.5)	26.0 (78.8)
Mean daily minimum °C (°F)	20.0 (68.0)	20.4 (68.7)	21.0 (69.8)	22.2 (72.0)	22.7 (72.9)	22.6 (72.7)	22.3 (72.1)	22.3 (72.1)	22.3 (72.1)	21.9 (71.4)	20.9 (69.6)	20.2 (68.4)	21.6 (70.9)
Record low °C (°F)	14.0 (57.2)	14.7 (58.5)	14.4 (57.9)	17.6 (63.7)	18.4 (65.1)	20.6 (69.1)	19.9 (67.8)	20.2 (68.4)	20.2 (68.4)	17.6 (63.7)	15.2 (59.4)	14.4 (57.9)	14.0 (57.2)
Average precipitation mm (inches)	4.7 (0.19)	4.2 (0.17)	8.0 (0.31)	36.1 (1.42)	123.3 (4.85)	256.8 (10.11)	150.1 (5.91)	183.8 (7.24)	240.4 (9.46)	132.2 (5.20)	32.5 (1.28)	10.3 (0.41)	1,182.4 (46.55)
Average precipitation days (≥ 1.0 mm)	1.5	1.0	1.2	2.8	7.7	15.1	11.3	13.2	16.2	10.4	4.0	2.3	86.7
Source: NOAA

== See also ==
- List of places in Guatemala
