= Sierra del Merendón =

Mountain range on the border of Guatemala and Honduras

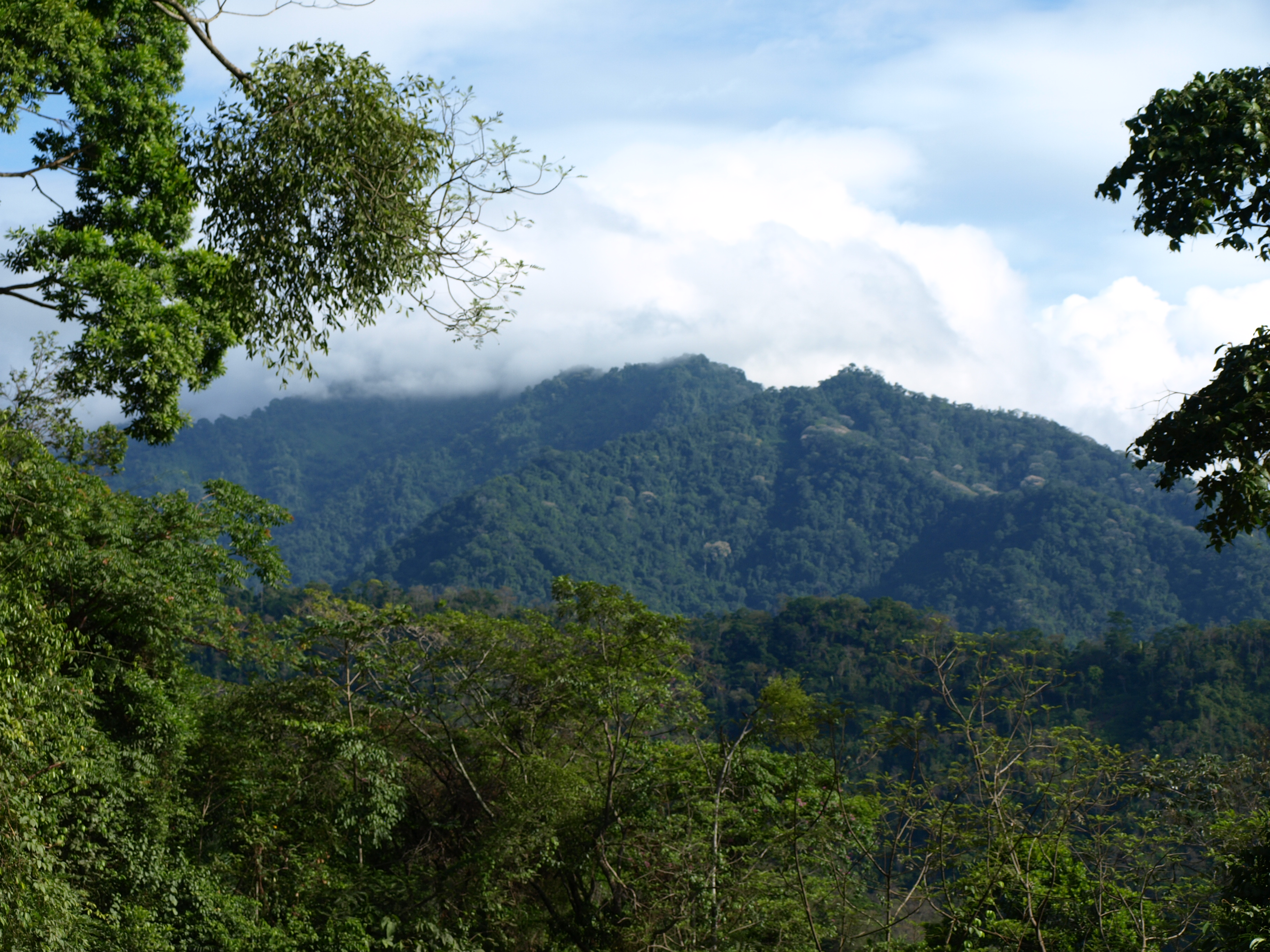
- Sierra del Merendón

Highest point
- Elevation: 2,400 m (7,900 ft)
- Coordinates: 14°39′57″N 88°58′54″W

Geography
- Countries: Guatemala and Honduras
- Departments: Zacapa, Izabal, Cortés and Santa Barbara

Sierra del Merendón is a mountain range extending on the eastern border of Guatemala and Honduras. Its south-western border is marked by the Lempa River valley, its northern border by the Motagua River valley. The mountain range has several different biomes and habitats, including cloud forests.

The Cusuco National Park (Parque Nacional El Cusuco) is located on the Honduran side and protects an area spanning 23,440 hectares of temperate forest in the Merendón mountain range. The core zone is located at an altitude of 1,800 - 2,242 m. (15° 29.8' − 15° 32.1' N, 88° 13.0' − 88° 16.3' W). Predominant forest habitats in the park are cloud forests (1,500 - 2,242 m), semi-arid pine forests on south-facing slopes (800 - 1,500 m), and wet deciduous forests on north-facing slopes (500 - 1,500 m).

The mountain range supports all five big cat species found in Honduras: jaguars, jaguarundis, margays, ocelots, and pumas. The jaguar population is not resident, instead likely using the range to move between habitats on either side.
