= Sensenti =

- Municipality
- Location within Honduras
- Coordinates: 14°29′N 88°56′W
- Country: Honduras
- Department: Ocotepeque
- Villages: 10

Area
  - Total: 119.85 km^{2} (46.27 sq mi)

Population (2015)
  - Total: 11,668
  - Density: 97.355/km^{2} (252.15/sq mi)

Sensenti is a municipality in the Honduran department of Ocotepeque.

== Demographics ==
At the time of the 2013 Honduras census, Sensenti municipality had a population of 11,453. Of these, 99.11% were Mestizo, 0.53% Indigenous, 0.24% Black or Afro-Honduran and 0.11% White.
