= Jocotán =

- Municipality and town
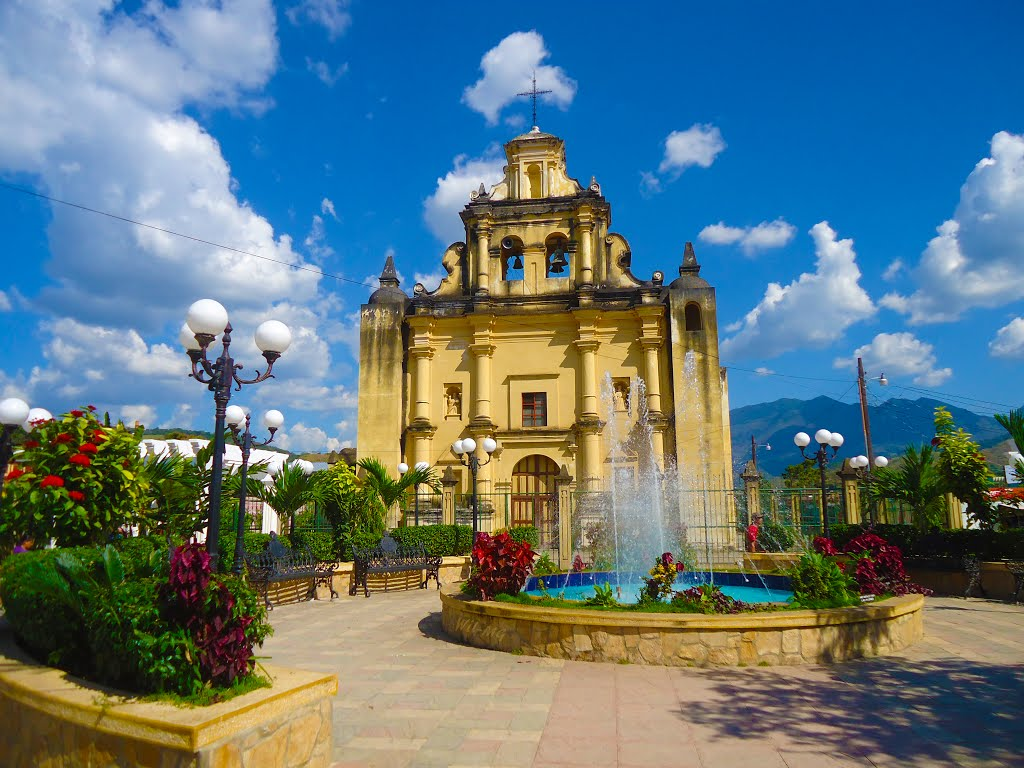
- Central plaza with a colonial Catholic church

- Location in Guatemala
- Coordinates: 14°49′0″N 89°23′0″W
- Country: Guatemala
- Department: Chiquimula
- Established: 1723

Government
  - Mayor (2016-2020): José Fernando Carrera Franco (Partido Patriota)

Area
  - Municipality and town: 91 sq mi (235 km^{2})

Population (2018 census)
  - Municipality and town: 66,379
  - Density: 732/sq mi (282/km^{2})
  - Urban: 8,387
- Climate: Aw

Jocotán is a town and municipality in the Chiquimula department of Guatemala.

Radio Chortis, a Roman Catholic radio station funded by Belgian and German Catholics, is located in the town. It broadcasts primarily in Spanish, but there are a few hours a week in the Ch'orti' language, which is still spoken in some isolated areas.

== History ==
=== 2001 famine ===
«If 80% of the population in Guatemala lives in poverty, with that percent, I do not know what is the big fuss about this famine.

— President Alfonso Portillo, 2001
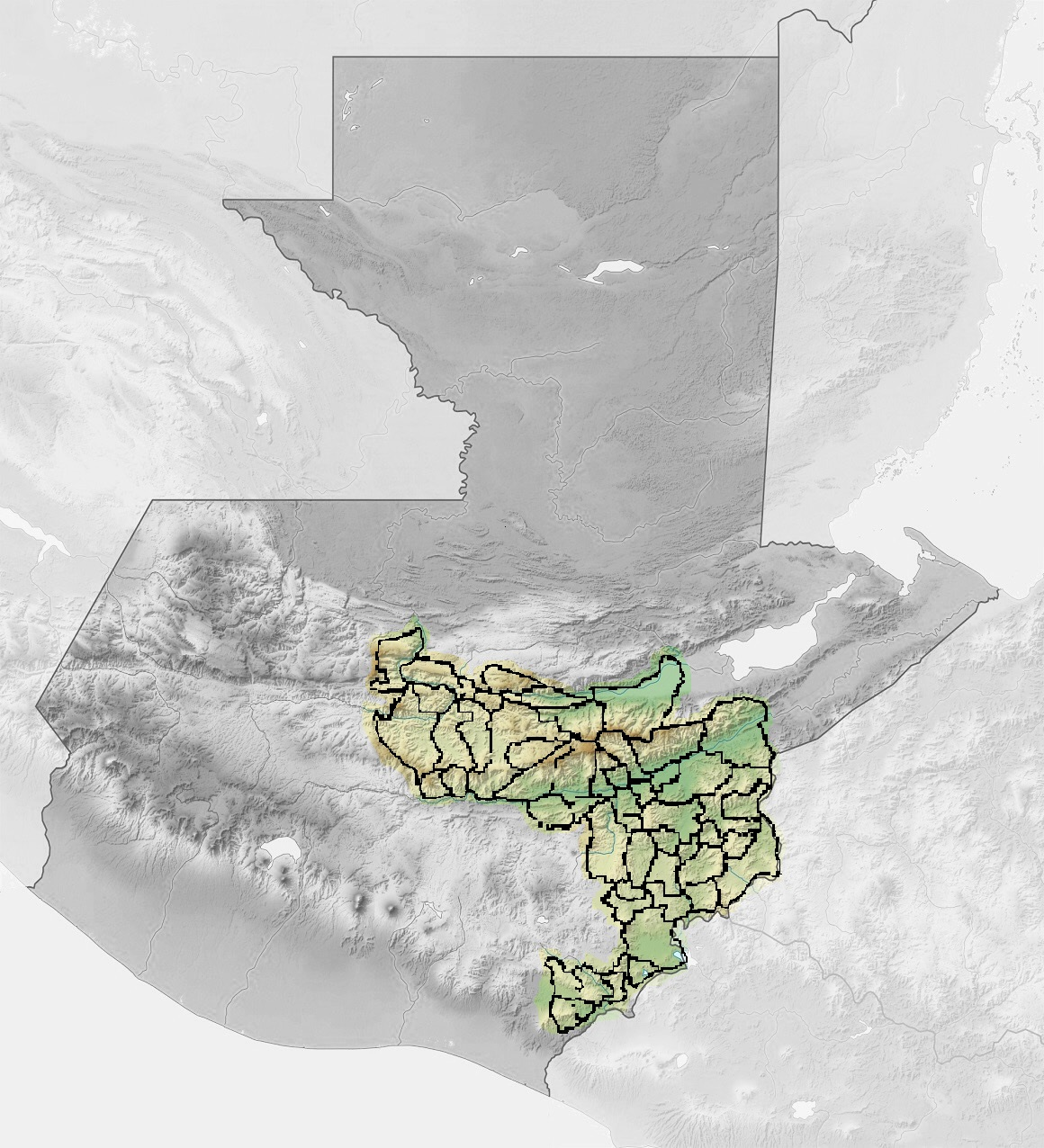
Jocotán location in the Corredor Seco (English: Dry Corridor) in Guatemala

On 3 August 2001, Jocotán municipality declared yellow code in the area when it learned about the desperate situation that the rural communities were facing imminent famine; the root cause of the crisis were the short raining season, and the decline in the international coffee price. Alfonso Portillo's government decreed State of Calamity to get international help; officially, 48 deceased were reported, but there were rumors of hundreds of casualties.

== Climate ==
Jocotán has a tropical savanna climate (Köppen: Aw).

Climate data for Jocotán
Month	Jan	Feb	Mar	Apr	May	Jun	Jul	Aug	Sep	Oct	Nov	Dec	Year
Mean daily maximum °C (°F)	29.4 (84.9)	30.7 (87.3)	33.4 (92.1)	34.0 (93.2)	33.7 (92.7)	31.6 (88.9)	31.1 (88.0)	31.5 (88.7)	30.9 (87.6)	30.3 (86.5)	29.4 (84.9)	28.7 (83.7)	31.2 (88.2)
Daily mean °C (°F)	23.7 (74.7)	24.7 (76.5)	26.7 (80.1)	27.5 (81.5)	27.6 (81.7)	26.3 (79.3)	26.0 (78.8)	26.0 (78.8)	25.7 (78.3)	25.2 (77.4)	24.3 (75.7)	23.5 (74.3)	25.6 (78.1)
Mean daily minimum °C (°F)	18.0 (64.4)	18.7 (65.7)	20.0 (68.0)	21.1 (70.0)	21.5 (70.7)	21.0 (69.8)	20.9 (69.6)	20.6 (69.1)	20.6 (69.1)	20.2 (68.4)	19.2 (66.6)	18.4 (65.1)	20.0 (68.0)
Average precipitation mm (inches)	3 (0.1)	4 (0.2)	7 (0.3)	16 (0.6)	91 (3.6)	196 (7.7)	144 (5.7)	145 (5.7)	180 (7.1)	90 (3.5)	21 (0.8)	9 (0.4)	906 (35.7)
Source: Climate-Data.org

== Geographic location ==
Jocotán is surrounded by Chiquimula Department municipalities, except at North, where it borders Zacapa:

== See also ==
- List of places in Guatemala

== Notes and references ==
=== Bibliography ===
- Fernández Lacayo, Alvaro Gabriel (2007). Apoyo a la docencia en el Instituto Técnico en Recursos Naturales Maya Chortí e investigación relacionado con la evaluación de cinco tratamientos de blanqueado de la hoja de palma (Sabal guatemalensis Beccari) en apoyo a la Asociación de Artesanos Ajpat´nar Chortí en el municipio de Jocotán, Chiquimula, de Febrero de 2004 a Noviembre de 2004 (PDF). Tesis (in Spanish). Guatemala: Universidad de San Carlos de Guatemala.
