= Quezaltepeque, Chiquimula =

Coordinates: 14°38′N 89°27′W

Quezaltepeque (Spanish pronunciation: [kesalteˈpeke]) is a municipality, with a population of 28,075 (2018 census) and an area of 239 km^{2}, in the Chiquimula department of Guatemala. The local economy is based on agriculture. Agricultural products include coffee, maize and beans. As of 1993, there was a working telegraph terminal there in the post office.

== Etymology ==
Quetzaltepēc is Nahuatl for "At the quetzal-feather hill". The British spelled it Quesaltpeque, in the 19th century.

== Population ==
As of 1850, the municipality had an estimated population of 4,000.
