= San Jorge, Zacapa =

San Jorge
- Municipality
- Location of San Jorge
- Coordinates: 14°56′N 89°36′W
- Country: Guatemala
- Department: Zacapa
- Gazetted: 21 February 2014
- Seat: San Jorge

Government
  - Type: Mayor–council
  - Mayor: David Trujillo

Area
  - Total: 82.27 km^{2} (31.76 sq mi)
- Elevation (of seat): 210 m (690 ft)

Population (2018 Census)
  - Total: 12,304
  - Estimate (2018): 13,045
  - Density: 149.6/km^{2} (387.3/sq mi)
- Time zone: UTC-6 (Central)
- Website: Official website

San Jorge is a municipality in the Guatemalan department of Zacapa, located approximately 8 kilometres (5.0 mi) southwest of the departmental capital, also called Zacapa.

== Geography ==
San Jorge is located in the foothills on the south side of the Motagua River valley, just south of its confluence with the Río Grande de Zacapa. It borders the Zacapan municipalities of Huité to the west, Estanzuela to the north, and Zacapa to the east, and the municipality of Chiquimula, the capital of Chiquimula Department, to the south. The municipality covers an area of 82.27 square kilometres (31.76 sq mi).

The relief of San Jorge presents a contrast between the flat plains in the northern and western parts of the municipality, and the mountainous terrain punctuated by steep valleys in the east and south. Forests cover 41% of the municipality's land area. The municipal seat of San Jorge sits at the lowest elevation in the municipality, 210 metres (690 ft) above sea level.

San Jorge is drained by various quebradas or streams. The longest of these is the Quebrada San Juan, which flows 24 kilometres (15 mi) southwest to northeast from the El Gigante mountain to the Río Grande de Zacapa. Many of the quebradas flow only during the wet season – those that flow year-round have greatly diminished volumes in the dry season – and all are highly polluted by waste and pose a serious environmental issue. There is no water treatment facility in the municipality.

San Jorge has a tropical climate with an annual average temperature of 27 °C (81 °F) and a relative humidity typically around 74%. March and April are the hottest months. As in the rest of Zacapa Department, rainfall is low and highly variable: annual precipitation is 470 millimetres (19 in), and the wet season lasts from June to October.

== History ==
The plains of San Jorge began attracting settlers in the 17th century, who raised cattle and grew corn. One of the first settlers was Nicolás de Peralta y Cisneros, the son of a peninsular and a criolla, who established the haciendas of San Juan and San Nicolás in the area and became its first parish priest in 1661. The area was called Llanetillos from the 18th century onwards until 1935, when Jorge Ubico approved a petition from its inhabitants to change its name to San Jorge. San Jorge built its first groundwater distribution system in 1996.

On 28 January 2014, the Congress of the Republic of Guatemala decreed the creation of San Jorge from territory previously part of the municipality of Zacapa. The decree was gazetted in the Diario de Centro América on 21 February 2014, and entered into force eight days later.

== Government ==
The following people have served as mayor of San Jorge:

- Ricardo Flores Chacón, 2014–2016
- Byron Pineda, 2016–2020
- David Trujillo, 2020–2024

== Demographics ==
In the 2018 Guatemalan Census, which had an estimated underenumeration rate of 9.0%, San Jorge recorded a total population of 12,304 inhabitants. The National Institute of Statistics subsequently estimated the population of San Jorge in 2018 to be 13,045.

== Culture ==
Holy Week festivities in San Jorge include parades, the making of sawdust carpets, and traditional cuisine and dancing. Each village in the municipality celebrates the feast day of its patron saint with dances and beauty pageants. Bullfighting, jaripeo, cockfighting, and horse shows are also popular pastimes.

== Economy and infrastructure ==
The main cash crops grown in San Jorge are canteloupes and watermelons, which are exported via the port of Santo Tomás to the United States, or sold at the Central Wholesale Market (Central de Mayoreo, CENMA) in Villa Nueva to buyers from the rest of Guatemala, El Salvador and Honduras. Corn, beans, sorghum, and peppers are also produced for local consumption.

A paved departmental road ZAC-8 connects the municipal seat of San Jorge with Central America Highway 10 just outside of the town of Zacapa. Other roads in San Jorge remain unpaved.
