= San Cristóbal Acasaguastlán =

- Municipality
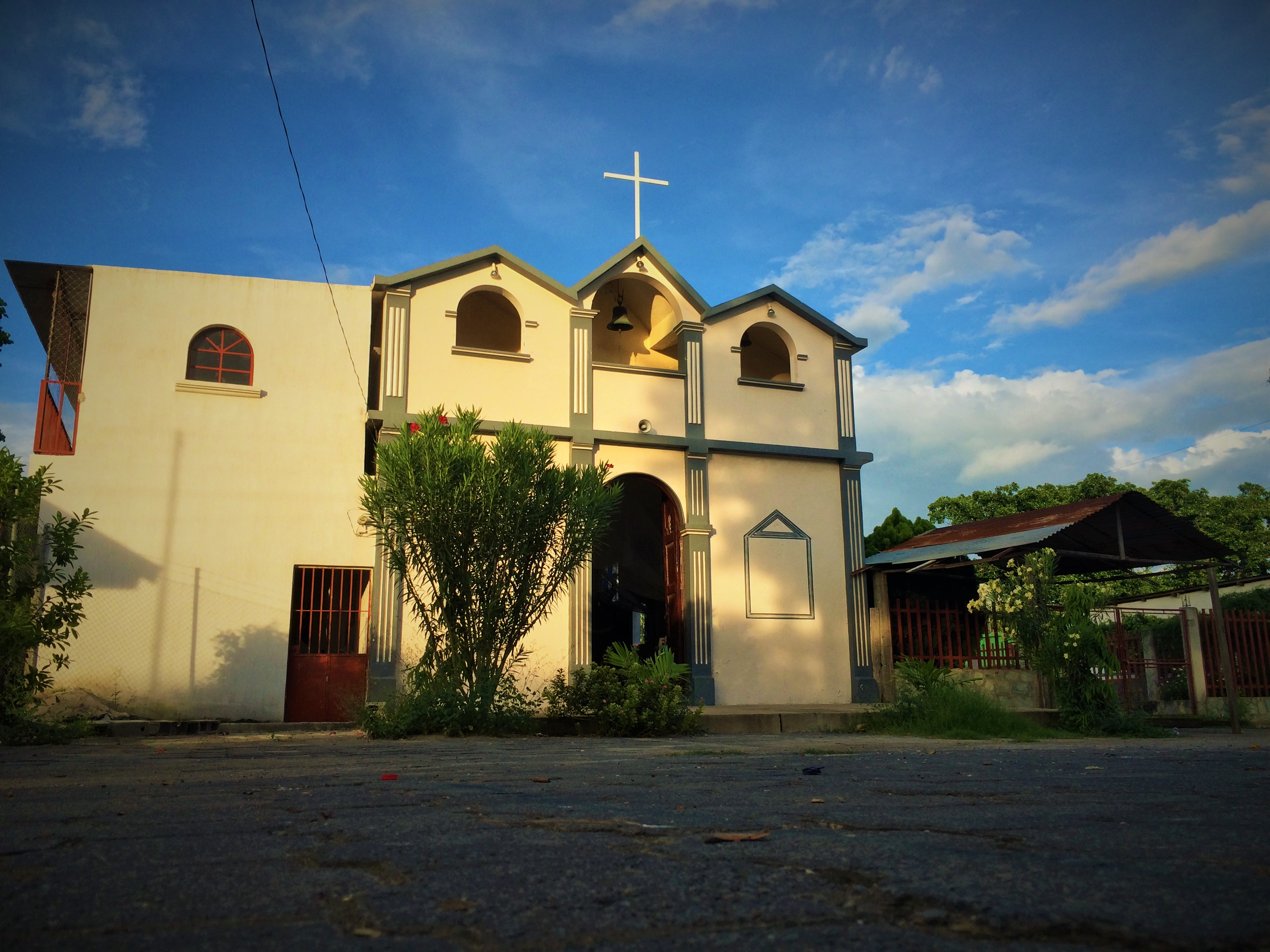

- Location in Guatemala
- Coordinates: 14°55′08″N 89°52′20″W
- Country: Guatemala
- Department: El Progreso
- Municipality: San Cristóbal Acasaguastlán

Government
  - Type: Municipal

Area
  - Municipality: 124 km^{2} (48 sq mi)
- Elevation: 250 m (820 ft)
- Highest elevation: 2,110 m (6,920 ft)
- Lowest elevation: 250 m (820 ft)

Population (Census 2002)
  - Municipality: 6,129
  - Urban: 1,846
  - Religions: Roman Catholicism Evangelicalism
- Time zone: UTC-6
- Climate: BSh
- Website: Municipality site

San Cristóbal Acasaguastlán (Spanish pronunciation: [saŋ kɾisˈtoβal akasaɣwaskaˈtlan]) is a town in the El Progreso department of Guatemala. San Cristóbal Acasaguastlán is located on the northern bank of the Motagua River at an altitude of 250 m. It had a population of 6,129 people at the 2002 census, and covers a territory of 124 square kilometres (48 sq mi). San Cristóbal Acasaguastlán borders on San Agustín Acasaguastlán to the northwest, Usumatlán to the east, and El Jicaro to the south. It is located on the inter-ocean highway (CA-9), 101 km from Guatemala City.

== History ==
San Cristóbal Acasaguastlán's history has its origins in Mayan culture; its people are associated with the cultures of Copán and Quiriguá. In the ninth and tenth centuries AD, the Nahuas settled in the vicinity of San Cristóbal Acasaguastlán, beginning a cultural mixture leading to their indigenous language (Alaguilac). At the time of the Spanish conquest the town of San Cristobal was founded, driving the aboriginal peoples from their town to scattered settlements in the mountains. At the time of conquest, the town of Acasaguastlán was a holy and sacred place for the Maya peoples. It did not have major construction, only mounds as in Guaytán. The Spanish used the prehistoric Acasaguastlán province for their town of San Cristobal; its central square was the site for one of the pro-independence riots of 1812. After Guatemala gained its independence from Spain in 1821, San Cristóbal Acasaguastlán belonged to the Zacapa Department under Decree 683 of April 13, 1908; with Legislative Decree 1965 of April 3, 1934 the new Department of El Progreso was established, which included San Cristóbal Acasaguastlán. Two of the finest examples of 16th-century Baroque architecture can be found in San Agustín Acasaguastlán and San Cristóbal Acasaguastlán in El Progreso.

== Education ==
San Cristobal is currently (as of 2011) the only municipality in Guatemala reporting a 100% literacy rate.

== Church ==
The colonial Cathedral of San Cristobal of 1654 is being restored, and promises to be on a par with the cathedrals and churches found in Antigua. The restoration project has been undertaken to undo damage caused by the earthquake of 1976.
