= List of journalists killed in Guatemala =

Guatemala is one of the most dangerous countries for journalists and media workers in Latin America. At least 342 journalists were murdered and 126 were disappeared or illegally arrested during the Guatemalan Civil War (1960–1996). On average, that would calculate to one attack each month for 36 years. When fighting broke out between the leftist guerrilla movements and the right-wing government, journalism became a dangerous profession in the country. Hundreds of media workers were beaten, imprisoned, kidnapped, or even killed for writing about corruption, repression, organized crime, and human right violations committed by the regime. As the intensity of the civil war increased in the 1970s, Guatemalan journalism polarized and journalists became involved in politics. If a citizen wanted to report a crime, they went to the press, not to law enforcement; people who wanted to voice their political opposition sent their work for publication to newspapers, not to the Guatemalan government. By 1985, when Guatemala readopted its constitutional rule, press freedom began to improve. When a peace treaty was signed in 1996, the atmosphere improved for journalists in Guatemala and the killings of media workers dropped significantly. However, attacks against the press and targeted killings continued under the form of organized crime.

The end of the civil war made the Guatemalan press free in several aspects; newspapers began to publish articles about government corruption, a topic that was frequently avoided during the war-time era, in increasing numbers. Despite these improvements, journalists in Guatemala learned to adopt a culture of self-censorship that dates back to the civil war. Negative attitudes from the government towards the Guatemalan press continue to exist, and the press lacks the economic independence to break away from the government and its advertisements and become fully autonomous. Most of the media outlets in the country are centered in Guatemala City, the capital. Journalists who work in the capital have better working conditions and are better protected from attacks than those living in the provinces, where they are easily pressured by local officials for their direct reporting. Since the mid-2000s, drug-related violence and the presence of Mexican organized crime, in particular of Los Zetas, has increased the number of homicides in Guatemala and attacks against the press.

== During the Guatemalan Civil War ==
Date	Name	Location	Media outlet	Status	Refs
1948	Alejandro Córdova	Guatemala	El Imparcial	Killed	
20 August 1960	Manuel Ávila Ayala (pen name): Meme Ayala	Guatemala	Diario de Centroamérica	Killed	
12 July 1967	José Arnoldo Guilló Martínez	Escuintla, Escuintla Department	Radio Sur; Radio Palmeras	Disappeared	
4 September 1967	José Torón Barrios	Guatemala	Voz de la Liberación	Killed	
1968	Gonzalo Acevedo	Guatemala City, Guatemala Department	La Hora	Killed	
1970s	Luis Díaz Pérez	Guatemala	N/A	Killed	
1970s	Enrique Salazar	Guatemala	N/A	Killed	
29 April 1970	Julio César de la Roca	Guatemala	La Nación	Killed	
20 November 1970	Enrique Salazar Solórzano	Guatemala	El Debate; Guatemala Flash	Disappeared	
20 November 1970	Luis Díaz Pérez	Guatemala	Guatemala Flash	Disappeared	
10 December 1970	Humberto González Juárez	Guatemala	N/A	Killed	
15 May 1974	Werner Roswald Trejo Álvarez	Guatemala	N/A	Disappeared	
19 July 1975	Julio Roberto Pensamiento	San Agustín Acasaguastlán, El Progreso	La Nación	Killed	
22 July 1975	José María López Valdizón	Guatemala	Alero; Presencia; Revista de Guatemala	Disappeared	
28 July 1975	Carlos Humberto Oliveros	Guatemala City, Guatemala Department	Nuevo Diario del Aire	Disappeared	
15 December 1976	Manuel de Jesús Mendizábal	Guatemala	N/A	Disappeared	
19 May 1979	Carlos Gilberto Aquino Cruz	Jalapa, Jalapa	Oriental	Killed	
22 September 1978	Héctor Augusto Vásquez	Huehuetenango, Huehuetenango	Radio Poderosa	Disappeared	
6 November 1978	Antonio Estuardo Ciani García	Guatemala	Asociación de Periodistas Escolares	Disappeared	
11 December 1978	José Héctor Sosa Villeda	Guatemala	Guate Cosas	Killed	
19 November 1979	José León Castañeda	Guatemala	SIMCOS	Killed	
1980	Baltasar Toy Medrano	Guatemala	Radio Quiché	Killed	
1980	Víctor Galeano Rodríguez	Guatemala	N/A	Killed	
March 1980	Hugo Rolando Melgar	Guatemala	7 Días	Killed	
17 April 1980	Oscar Enrique Ovalle Barrillas	Guatemala City, Guatemala Department	N/A	Disappeared	
21 June 1980	Manuel René Polanco	Guatemala	Prensa Libre	Disappeared	
24 June 1980	Belte Elvidio Villatoro	Guatemala	Nuevo Diario	Killed	
5 July 1980	Marco Antonio Cacao Muñoz	Guatemala	Radio Sensación	Killed	
5 July 1980	Eliot Hernández	Retalhuleu, Retalhuleu	La Nación	Killed	
16 July 1980	Samuel González Romero	Guatemala	Prensa en Acción	Killed	
17 July 1980	Manuel de Jesús Marroquín Castañeda	Guatemala City, Guatemala Department	N/A	Killed	
26 July 1980	Julio César Coronado Espinoza	Escuintla, Escuintla Department	El Estudiante	Killed	
1 August 1980	José Alfredo González	Escuintla, Escuintla Department	Clarín; Radio Tropicana	Killed	
1 August 1980	Julio Cojón Tecún	Escuintla, Escuintla Department	Radio Tropicana	Killed	
1 August 1980	Alberto Santisteban	Escuintla, Escuintla Department	Radio Tropicana	Killed	
1 August 1980	Julio Solórzano Beltetón	Escuintla, Escuintla Department	Radio Tropicana	Killed	
5 August 1980	Mario Ribas Montes	Guatemala	La Hora; El Imparcial; Diario de Centroamérica	Killed	
5 September 1980	Luis Alberto Romero (pen name): Timoteo Curruchiche	Guatemala	Radio Sonora	Killed	
15 September 1980	Ramiro Antonio García Jiménez	Guatemala City, Guatemala Department	Nuevo Diario	Disappeared	
6 October 1980	Felipe Zepeda y Zepeda	Guatemala	Radio Quiche	Killed	
14 October 1980	Víctor Hugo Pensamiento	El Progreso Department	La Nación; Tele Prensa; Radio Nuevo Mundo	Killed	
16 October 1980	Irma Flaquer Azurdia	Guatemala City, Guatemala Department	La Hora	Disappeared	
24 October 1980	Gaspar Culán Yataz	Santiago Atitlan, Sololá	Radio Voz de Atitlán	Killed	
19 December 1980	Alaíde Foppa	Guatemala	El Imparcial; El Nacional	Disappeared	
19 December 1980	José Guilló Martínez	Guatemala	N/A	Disappeared	
19 December 1980	Sergio Sánchez	Retalhuleu, Retalhuleu	Teleprensa	Killed	
19 December 1980	Carlos Siliézar	Escuintla, Escuintla	N/A	Killed	
1981	Francisco Par	Guatemala	N/A	Killed	
1981	Paredes Quiñónez	Guatemala	N/A	Killed	
30 January 1981	Oscar Rolando Figueroa	Guatemala	N/A	Killed	
4–15 February 1981	Simón Estansilao Cabrera	Guatemala	Radio Musical	Killed	
6 February 1981	Jorge Marroquín Mejía	Guatemala	Mundo Nuevo; El Independiente	Killed	
21 February 1981	Simón Leonidas Cabrera Rivera	Guatemala	Radio Jutiapa	Killed	
24 February 1981	Óscar Arturo Palencia Pineda	Guatemala	Siete Días en la USAC	Killed	
10 March 1981	Oscar Leonel Mujía Córdoba	Huehuetenango, Huehuetenango Department	Nuevo Mundo	Disappeared	
31 March 1981	Luis Alfredo López	Guatemala	N/A	Killed	
21 April 1981	Isidro Mirando López	Guatemala	Radio Tropical	Killed	
21 May 1981	Fulvio Alirio Mejía Milián	Cuilapa, Santa Rosa	La Nación; El Independiente	Killed	
21 May 1981	Edgar Rolando Castillo Rivera	Quetzaltenango, Quetzaltenango	Radioperiódico América	Killed	
16 June 1981	Rodrigo Ramírez Morales	Guatemala	Consejo Nacional de la Publicidad	Disappeared	
23 July 1981	Sonia Calderón de Martell	Guatemala	El Gráfico	Disappeared	
9 August 1981	Mario Solórzano Foppa	Guatemala	Infopress; Nuevo Diario	Killed	
11 August 1981	Abner Daniel Recinos Alfaro	Guatemala	Seis	Disappeared	
16 September 1981	Didier Juvenal Martell González	Chiquimulilla, Santa Rosa	El Gráfico	Killed	
1982	Agustín Tzaloj Tuist	Sololá, Sololá Department	Radio Quicoté	Killed	
21 January 1982	Carmen Jax Say	Guatemala	Radio Utatlán	Killed	
2 February 1982	Roberto Girón Lemus	Guatemala City, Guatemala Department	La Nación	Killed	
1989	Danilo Barillas	Guatemala	¿Por Qué?	Killed	
29 March 1989	Griffith Davis	Quiché, Guatemala	Freelance journalist	Killed	
29 March 1989	Nicholas Chapman Blake	Quiché, Guatemala	Freelance journalist	Killed	
15 October 1990	Humberto González Gamarra	Guatemala City, Guatemala Department	N/A	Killed	
15 October 1990	Miguel Ángel Cortín	Guatemala City, Guatemala Department	N/A	Killed	
3 July 1993	Jorge Carpio Nicolle	Chichicastenango, Quiché	El Gráfico	Killed	
24 December 1993	Víctor Manuel de la Cruz	Guatemala City, Guatemala Department	Radio Sonora	Killed	
12 September 1994	Victor Hugo López Escobar	Guatemala City, Guatemala Department	Radio Progreso	Killed	
29 January 1995	Alberto Antoniotti Monge	Guatemala City, Guatemala Department	El Gráfico	Killed	
11 November 1995	Edwin Estuardo Mansilla De León	Guatemala City, Guatemala Department	Radio Progreso	Killed	
11 April 1996	Juan José Yantuche	Mixco, Guatemala Department	TV Noticias	Killed	
10 December 1996	Israel Hernández Marroquín	Guatemala City, Guatemala Department	Infopress Centroamericano	Killed	

== After the Guatemalan Civil War ==
Date	Name	Location	Media outlet	Status	Refs
5 June 1997	Jorge Luis Marroquín Sagastume	Jocotán, Chiquimula	Sol Chortí	Killed	
16 July 1997	Norman Homero Hernández Pérez	Tiquisate, Escuintla	Radio Campesina	Killed	
14 November 1997	Luis Ronaldo de Leon Godoy	Guatemala City, Guatemala Department	Prensa Libre	Killed	
27 December 1999	Larry Lee	Guatemala City, Guatemala Department	Bridge Financial News	Killed	
28 April 2000	Roberto Martínez Castañeda	Guatemala City, Guatemala Department	Prensa Libre	Killed	
25 June 2000	Francisco Antonio Castillo Gálvez	Guatemala City, Guatemala Department	Avances	Killed	
5 September 2001	Jorge Mynor Alegría Armendáriz	Puente Barrios, Izabal	Radio Amatique	Killed	
24 July 2003	Héctor Ramírez	Guatemala City, Guatemala Department	Noti-7; Radio Sonora	Killed	
11 September 2006	Eduardo Heriberto Maas Bol	Cobán, Alta Verapaz	Radio Punto	Killed	
3 May 2007	Mario Rolando López Sánchez	Guatemala City, Guatemala Department	Radio Sonora	Killed	
23 January 2008	Hugo Arce	Guatemala	¿Y Qué?	Killed	
12 April 2008	Rubén Bozarreyes Luna	Gualán, Zacapa	Radio Gualán	Killed	
10 May 2008	Jorge Mérida Pérez	Coatepeque, Quetzaltenango	Prensa Libre	Killed	
22 October 2008	Abel Girón Morales	Guatemala City, Guatemala Department	El Periódico	Killed	
2009	Luis Alberto Oliva Orellana	Chiquimula, Zacapa	N/A	Killed	
1 April 2009	Rolando Santiz de León	Guatemala City, Guatemala Department	Telecentro Trece	Killed	
5 June 2009	Marco Antonio Estrada	Chiquimula, Zacapa	Telediario	Killed	
27 May 2010	Anibal Archila	Guatemala City	Noti7	Killed	
18–19 May 2011	Yensi Roberto Ordoñez Galdámez	Nueva Concepción, Escuintla	Channel 14	Killed	
20 March 2013	Jaime Napoleón Jarquín Duarte	Ciudad Pedro de Alvarado, Jutiapa	Nuestro Diario	Killed	
7 April 2013	Luis Alberto Lemus Ruano	Jalpatagua, Jutiapa	Café TV; Radio Stereo Café	Killed	
7 August 2013	Luis de Jesús Lima	Zacapa, Zacapa	La Sultana	Killed	
20 August 2013	Carlos Alberto Orellana Chávez	Suchitepéquez Department	Canal Óptimo 23	Killed	
10 March 2015	Danilo López	Mazatenango, Suchitepéquez	Prensa Libre	Killed	
10 March 2015	Federico Salazar	Mazatenango, Suchitepéquez	Nuevo Mundo	Killed	
14 March 2015	Guido Armando Giovanni Villatoro Ramos	Chicacao, Suchitepéquez Department	Canal 14	Killed	
1 February 2018	Laurent Ángel Castillo Cifuentes	Santo Domingo Suchitepéquez	newspaper Nuestro Diario	Killed	
1 February 2018	Luis Alfredo de León Miranda	Santo Domingo Suchitepéquez	Radio Coaltepec	Killed	
30 July 2021	Pedro Alfonso Guadrón Hernández	Concepción Las Minas	Concepción Las Minas mi Tierra	Killed	
2 October 2026	Evelio López	San Pedro Necta, Huehuetenango	Huehue en Noticias	Killed	

== See also ==
- List of journalists killed in Honduras
- List of journalists killed in Mexico
- List of journalists killed in Venezuela

== Sources ==
=== Bibliography ===
- IFEX (2012). "Guatemala: Overflow and impunity" (PDF). IFEX (organization). p. 21. Archived (PDF) from the original on 13 August 2013.
- CEH (1999). Guatemala: Las violaciones de los derechos humanos y los hechos de violencia (in Spanish). Original form at the University of Michigan: Comisión para el Esclarecimiento Histórico. p. 288. ISBN 9992254033.
- CEH2 (1999). Guatemala memoria del silencio (in Spanish). University of Texas at Austin: Comisión para el Esclarecimiento Histórico. p. 288. ISBN 9992254092.
- CEH3 (1999). Guatemala memoria del silencio (TOMO III) (PDF) (in Spanish). Comisión para el Esclarecimiento Histórico. ISBN 99922-54-03-3. Archived (PDF) from the original on 14 August 2013.
- CEH4 (1999). Guatemala memoria del silencio (TOMO VIII) (PDF) (in Spanish). Comisión para el Esclarecimiento Histórico. p. 400. ISBN 99922-54-08-4. Archived (PDF) from the original on 16 August 2013.
- Rockwell, Rick (2003). Media Power in Central America. University of Illinois Press. p. 296. ISBN 0252092287.
- Shea, Maureen (2001). Culture and Customs of Guatemala. Greenwood Publishing Group. pp. 151. ISBN 031330596X. "guatemala press radio."
- Trotti, Ricardo (1997). Unpunished Crimes Against Journalists. Original form at the University of Texas at Austin: The Association. p. 112.
- ODHAG (2005). Y la verdad nos hará libres (in Spanish). University of Texas at Austin: Oficina de Derechos Humanos del Arzobispado de Guatemala. p. 224.
- ODHAG2 (1999). Reconocimiento a la labor periodística en Guatemala (PDF) (in Spanish). Oficina de Derechos Humanos del Arzobispado de Guatemala. p. 225. Archived (PDF) from the original on 4 March 2016.
