= Regions of Guatemala =

Administrative divisions of Guatemala

Regions of Guatemala

Guatemala is divided in 22 departments that are organized in 8 development regions declared by the Guatemalan government.

== Official regions ==
=== Region I or Metropolitan ===
- Guatemala

=== Region II or North ===
- Alta Verapaz
- Baja Verapaz

=== Region III or Northeast ===
- Chiquimula
- El Progreso
- Izabal
- Zacapa

=== Region IV or Southeast ===
- Jutiapa
- Jalapa
- Santa Rosa

=== Region V or Central ===
- Chimaltenango
- Sacatepéquez
- Escuintla

=== Region VI or Southwest ===
- Quetzaltenango
- Retalhuleu
- San Marcos
- Suchitepéquez
- Sololá
- Totonicapán

=== Region VII or Northwest ===
- Huehuetenango
- Quiché

=== Region VIII or Petén ===
- Petén
