= Sanarate =

- Municipality
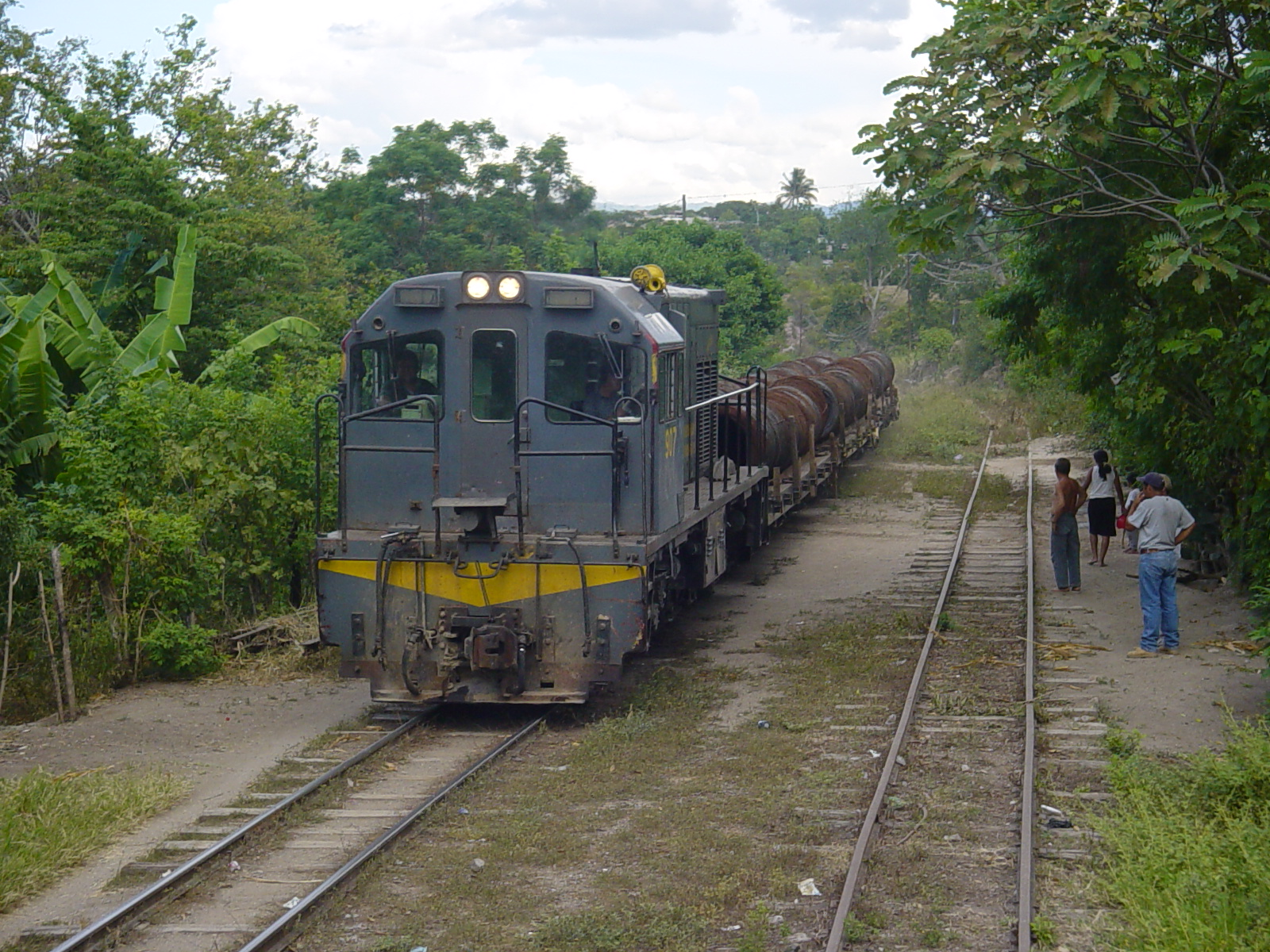

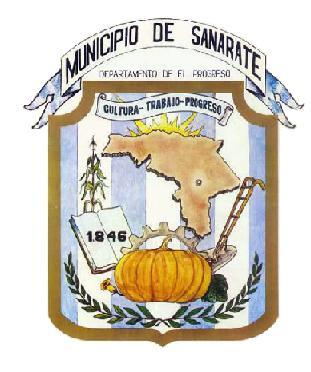
- Coat of arms

- Location in Guatemala
- Coordinates: 14°47′42″N 90°11′32″W
- Country: Guatemala
- Department: El Progreso

Government
  - Mayor: César Rodas (UNE)

Area
  - Total: 283 km^{2} (109 sq mi)

Population
  - Total: 39,444
  - Density: 139/km^{2} (361/sq mi)
- Climate: Aw

Sanarate is a city in the El Progreso department of Guatemala. It is the administrative seat of Sanarate Municipality. A population of 20,976 (2018 census) makes Sanarate the second largest city of El Progreso department, after the departmental capital of Guastatoya.

The municipality of Sanarate is formed by the town of Sanarate and 43 aldeas (villages). Some of the most popular are El Upayon, Agua Salobrega, Los Izotes and El Monte Grande. El Barranquillo is one of the many villages that belong to Sanarate. El Barranquillo celebrates its "virgen de Fatima festivities" from October 28 through November 1 or 2. Its festivities enlarge due to a national holiday called "el dia de los santos". Soccer games, food, mechanical games all await the visitor during these festivities.
