= Luis de Jesús Lima =

Guatemalan radio broadcaster

- Born: c. 1945
- Died: August 6, 2013; Zacapa, Guatemala
- Cause of death: Firearm
- Body discovered: His vehicle in Zacapa
- Occupation: Radio journalist
- Years active: Over 40
- Employer: Radio Sultana de Oriente
- Awards: El Tuno de Oro, 2011

Luis de Jesús Lima (c. 1945 – August 6, 2013) was a Guatemalan radio journalist and personality for the Radio Sultana de Oriente in Zacapa, Zacapa Department, Guatemala. He was killed right outside of the station. His death focused the attention given to the safety of Guatemalan journalists.

== Personal history ==
At the time of his murder, Luis de Jesús Lima was 68 years old. He was buried in the general cemetery in Zacapa.

== Career ==
Luis de Jesús Lima started his career as a journalist in February 1968 and, at the time of his death, was well into his fourth decade in the profession. He had worked at three different stations. At the time of his death he was a radio personality for Radio Sultana de Oriente, a radio station in the department capital city of Zacapa, Guatemala. He was a host of a music program and a public affairs program called "Somos Zacapas". On the latter, he often discussed politics, interviewed public figures and dealt with controversial issues. Listeners were able to call in and discuss various topics with him on the air. Lima was a guild member of La Asociación de Periodistas de Guatemala (APG).

== Awards ==
In 2011, Lima was awarded El Tuno de Oro. This award is given to outstanding individuals.

== Death ==
Zacapa is in Guatemala shown here relative to the capital Guatemala City.

Luis de Jesús Lima was shot and killed outside of the Radio Sultana de Oriente in Zacapa on 6 August 2014. The station is located in La Reforma neighborhood. Lima had just arrived to work and had not yet gotten out of his car. Two men on motorcycles drive past and shot into the car. He was found to have been hit by two bullets; one in his head and the other in his thorax. He was dead at the scene of the crime.

Several motivations were under investigation. The police ruled out robbery as his wallet was still with his body. The police originally believed his murder might have been politically motivation. Another reason may have been a discussion that took place between Lima and these men in the vicinity of a school. And still another point of investigation centered around an altercation Lima may have had with the men at a gas station minutes before his death. His death has also come along with other murders of Guatemalan journalists.

== Context and impact ==
Lima was the third journalist murdered in Guatemala in 2013. However, a week later on 14 August another radio journalist was shot and on 19 August, a TV journalist, Carlos Alberto Orellana Chávez of Canal Óptimo 23, was murdered, and both were from the Suchitepequez Department, Guatemala. The AP reported that from all the complaints of violence and murders against journalists in over decade in Guatemala, only three cases were successfully resolved, which left close to a hundred cases unresolved.

== Reactions ==
SIP-IAPA, based in Miami, called for a special prosecutor to be appointed.

Reporters Without Borders issued a joint statement with Cerigua Journalists' Oberservatory saying, "The safety of journalists should be a priority for the authorities. The motive for Lima’s murder is not yet known and we urge the investigators not to rule out any hypothesis, including a possible link to his work as a journalist."

Irena Bokova, director-general of UNESCO, said "Letting violence against journalists go unpunished is detrimental to media professionals’ ability carry out their work; it undermines both freedom of expression and freedom of information."

Freedom House has called on the authorities in Guatemala to better protect its journalists. A spokesperson issued the following statement, "Freedom of the press is foundational for the democratic development of any society, yet press freedom will not flourish when violence is directed against journalists. In Central America such incidences of violence are becoming tragically commonplace, and the Guatemalan government must take serious, credible, and immediate steps to safeguard press freedom. Journalists must be free to report – safely – on the most pressing issues affecting the country."

== See also ==
- List of journalists killed in Guatemala
