= Estanzuela Museum of Paleontology and Archaeology =

- Established: June 27, 1974; 51 years ago
- Location: Estanzuela, Guatemala
- Coordinates: 14.999171°N 89.576759°W
- Type: Archaeology museum

The Estanzuela Museum of Paleontology and Archaeology (Spanish: Museo de Paleontologia y Arqueología de Estanzuela) is a museum located in Estanzuela, Guatemala. The museum is dedicated to the preservation of archeological remains of Eastern Guatemala.

== History ==
The idea with the creation was with the intention of preserving different archeological artifacts in Guatemala after the archeological discoveries by the German Karl Theodor Sapper. One of the people who promoted the idea of the creation of the museum were David Vela and the director of the Museum of Natural History of Guatemala City, Jorge Ibarra. In the 1970s, Leonel Sisniega Otero, director of the Guatemalan Institute of Tourism at the time, requested that paleontologists Roberto Woolfolk and Bryan Patterson recover archeological pieces. In 1974, the museum opened for the first time in the presence of President Carlos Manuel Arana Osorio. In 2017, a virtual tour of the museum was added using an adapted version of Google Street View.

== Collections ==
The museum contains archaeological collections made of lithic and ceramics, as well as fossils from Eastern Guatemala. Among the collection of fossils are the remains of armadillos, prehistoric horses, toxodonts, capybaras, sloths and mastodons. The animal remains are skeletons dating back 150,000 years. It is estimated that the museum has more than 5,000 archeological pieces. The museum has exhibits related to the formation of the continents, the emergence of land animals and the formation of marine animals. In addition, the museum has exhibits related to the migration and evolution of the animals that inhabited Guatemala. Also in the museum there are short annotations of the findings made by Roberto Woolfolk. The museum also has relics found in the archaeological site of the tomb of Guaytán. The museum also contains pottery, ceramics, necklaces and plates of the Mayan civilization found in the Motagua River basin and the southern coast of Guatemala.
