= Guaytán =

Archaeological site in Guatemala

Guaytán is an archaeological site of the Maya civilization in the municipality of San Agustín Acasaguastlán, in the department of El Progreso, in Guatemala. It is the most important pre-Columbian archaeological site of the middle drainage of the Motagua River.

The site is located south of San Agustín Acasaguastlán, and to the north of the Motagua River, built on both banks of the Lato River. The site was inhabited from the Late Preclassic Period (c. 250 BC – 250 AD) to the Late Classic Period (c. 300 – 900 AD). The city controlled an important source of jadeite.

== Description ==
The site is distributed in a number of groups on both sides of the Lato River, but hasn't been completely mapped. The principal groups include the Acropolis, El Castillo, Carrillo, La Escuela, and La Estela.

Guaytán features an unusual Late to Terminal Classic ballcourt with an attached temple. Fragments of Classic period codices have been recovered from tombs at the site.

=== Sculptures ===
A number of zoomorphic sculptures have been recovered from Guaytán; five of these are believed to represent the heads of snakes and have been labelled as Monuments 1 through to 5. Although they have been described as ballcourt markers, they may have been set into the corners of buildings. Monument 6 represents a seated monkey with its arms curving around its front, with its left leg behind them. Only the right eye has been carved into the monument.

=== Burials ===
Guaytán features a number of large cists and extensive crypts containing multiple burials. Most were found under the remains of large structures that formed closed plazas. The crypts were built with large slabs of stone to form chambers that measured approximately 2 metres (6.6 ft) high. The largest slabs were set to form vaulted roofs to the chambers. A tomb under Structure 24 features small niches that contained vessels left as funerary offerings. Some of the crypts contained an antechamber used for additional burials.

Tomb 3 has a chamber that measures 1.7 metres (5.6 ft) wide by 2.4 metres (7.9 ft) long, accessed by a 1.3-metre (4.3 ft) long passage with a width of 0.9 metres (3.0 ft) and a height of 1.25 metres (4.1 ft).

== Site history ==
During the Late Preclassic, Guaytán was densely populated, although buildings were generally of perishable materials. At the time, the site had contacts with the Guatemalan Highlands and with the Pacific coastal lowlands. Guaytán was one of two sites (the other being La Vega de Cobán, in Zacapa) that controlled most of the trade passing along the Motagua River. In the Early Classic, the city underwent a population explosion and there was contact with the great metropolis of Teotihuacan, in the distant Valley of Mexico. By the Late Classic, contacts extended to the Petén lowlands, the Yucatán Peninsula, and the western portions of Honduras and El Salvador.

=== Modern history ===
The site was first reported in 1926 by archaeologist Gustavo Espinoza, although no serious investigations were undertaken until 1943. Projects to partially map the site were undertaken in 2001 and 2013.
