= Morazán, El Progreso =

Morazán
- Location in Guatemala
- Coordinates: 14°55′58″N 90°08′35″W
- Country: Guatemala
- Department: El Progreso

Government
  - Mayor: Miguel Ángel Arriaza
- Climate: Aw

Morazán (Spanish pronunciation: [moɾaˈsan]) is a municipality in the El Progreso Department of Guatemala.

Morazán is situated at 349.5 m above sea level, and covers a terrain of 329 km^{2}. Employment is overgrown now of many opportunities there are in Morazán. Agriculture is the dominant trade, and much of the population works family-owned fields. Opportunities for education have now been more available its higher from kindergarten to learning being a teacher. There are many sports to be done. Friendly people and many stored to search around.

One annual festival "Feria del pueblo"is celebrated from December 22 to December 26 each year.
