= Marco Antonio Estrada =

Marco Antonio Estrada Orla was a Guatemalan journalist who was killed on June 6, 2009, in Chiquimula, Guatemala. He was 39 years old at the time of his death.

== Career ==
Estrada worked in journalism for over 20 years. Early in his career, Estrada worked in the sports department of Radio Sultana de Oriente. He later worked at Radio Perla de Oriente. He also worked at Radio Estéreo Amistad and Radio Sonora. At the time of his death he had been working for ten years as a news correspondent for the national broadcaster Telediario, on Channel 3. He was a general-assignment reporter who often covered organized crime and drug trafficking stories.

== Murder ==
An unidentified assailant fired four shots at Estrada at 8 pm on June 6, 2009, as he was getting off his motorcycle on a street in Chiquimula, 140 miles east of Guatemala City. Witnesses said the gunman, who was described as short in stature, fled in a car that was parked at the scene of the crime. Estrada’s cell phone was taken in the attack.

Reporters Without Borders called on authorities to solve the murder. His murder was condemned by the Director-General of UNESCO, Koïchiro Matsuura, who expressed concern “about the effects of escalating violence against journalists in Guatemala and its negative impact on the quality of reporting. It is essential that those responsible for such crimes be brought to justice, to ensure respect for the inalienable right of freedom of expression and people’s access to information.” The murder was also condemned by the Inter American Press Association (IAPA), which called on the authorities to bring to justice those responsible for the crime. “We cannot resign ourselves to the triumph of vionece,” said Colombian journalist Enrique Santos Calderón, head of the IAPA.

Estrada was the second journalist to have been killed in Guatemala in 2009. The first was Rolando Santiz of Telecentro.

== See also ==
- List of journalists killed in Guatemala
