= San Antonio La Paz =

- Municipality
- Location in Guatemala
- Coordinates: 14°45′33″N 90°17′12″W
- Country: Guatemala
- Department: El Progreso

Government
  - Mayor: Nuvere Lopez

Area
  - Municipality: 146 km^{2} (56 sq mi)

Population (2018 census)
  - Municipality: 20,957
  - Density: 144/km^{2} (372/sq mi)
  - Urban: 11,343
- Climate: Aw

San Antonio La Paz (Spanish pronunciation: [san anˈtonjo la pas]) is a town and municipality in the El Progreso department of Guatemala. The municipality is situated at 1240 metres above sea level and covers an area of 146 km^{2}. San Antonio has improved in the past couple of years. San Antonio has two pharmacies and many doctors. Each house in San Antonio has a little of room that is sort of a forest of a little plantation for growing corn, coffee, beans, and other plants. There are trees all over San Antonio of all kind of fruit, apples, mangos, bananas, jocotes, oranges, lemons, limes, and other fruit.
