= Andersson Ortiz =

Guatemalan footballer (born 2001)

Personal information
- Full name: Andersson Edgar Josué Ortiz Falla
- Date of birth: 7 November 2001 (age 24)
- Place of birth: San Cristóbal Acasaguastlán, Guatemala
- Height: 1.80 m (5 ft 11 in)
- Position: Winger

Team information
- Current team: Comunicaciones
- Number: 11

Senior career*
Years	Team	Apps	(Gls)
2017–2018	Jicaro		
2019–2023	Guastatoya	83	(13)
2023–	Comunicaciones	15	(0)

International career
2023	Guatemala U23	3	(2)
- * Club domestic league appearances and goals as of 20:00, 3 August 2025 (UTC)

Andersson Edgar Josué Ortiz Falla (born 7 November 2001) is a Guatemalan professional footballer who plays as a winger for Liga Guate club Comunicaciones.

== Early life ==
Ortiz was born on 7 October 2001 in San Cristóbal Acasaguastlán. Growing up, he was heavily influenced and inspired by Neymar, his footballing idol.

== Club career ==
=== Guastatoya ===
On 7 October 2020, due to Ortiz' performances for Guastatoya, he had gained interest from several clubs in Costa Rica and Uruguay. A week later, Ortiz would score his first goal for the club in a 2–1 win against Sanarate.

On 5 June 2023, it was announced that Comunicaciones had gained interest in signing Ortiz. On 13 June, Comunicaciones were inching closer to signing the player. On 26 June, Ortiz confirmed he would be leaving the club and thanked the fans for their support.

=== Comunicaciones ===
On 16 June 2023, it was announced that Ortiz would be signing for Comunicaciones. During the presentation, Ortiz stated that it has always been his dream of being with the club ever since he was a little boy.

== International career ==
On 24 June 2023, Ortiz was called up to the Guatemala U23 squad for the 2023 Central American and Caribbean Games.

== Honours ==
Guastatoya

- Liga Nacional: 2020 Apertura

Comunicaciones

- Liga Nacional: 2023 Apertura
