= List of regions of Guatemala by Human Development Index =

This is a list of regions of Guatemala by Human Development Index as of 2023.

== Human development Index by Region ==
Rank	Region	HDI (2023)
High human development
1	Metropolitan (Guatemala)	0.759
Medium human development
2	Central (Chimaltenango, Sacatepéquez, Escuintla)	0.674
–	Guatemala (average)	0.662
3	Northeast (Chiquimula, El Progreso, Izabal, Zacapa)	0.655
4	Southeast (Jutiapa, Jalapa, Santa Rosa)	0.648
5	Petén (Petén)	0.642
6	Southwest (Quetzaltenango, Retalhuleu, San Marcos, Suchitepéquez, Sololá, Totonicapán)	0.641
7	North (Alta Verapaz, Baja Verapaz)	0.589
8	Northwest (Huehuetenango, Quiché)	0.587

== Human development Index by Department ==
Rank	Region	HDI (2021)
High human development
-	Guatemala City	0.792
1	Guatemala	0.719
2	Sacatepéquez	0.706
Medium human development
3	El Progreso	0.681
4	Santa Rosa	0.655
5	Quetzaltenango	0.653
6	Escuintla	0.650
7	Zacapa	0.650
8	Retalhuleu	0.650
9	Jutiapa	0.650
10	Solola	0.648
11	Chimaltenango	0.646
12	Suchitepéquez	0.635
Guatemala (average)		0.634
13	Baja Verapaz	0.631
14	Izabal	0.626
15	San Marcos	0.624
16	Petén	0.624
17	Jalapa	0.617
18	Chiquimula	0.593
19	Totonicapán	0.590
20	Huehuetenango	0.567
21	Quiché	0.564
22	Alta Verapaz	0.560
