= Tulumaje =

Coordinates: 14°56′N 90°02′W

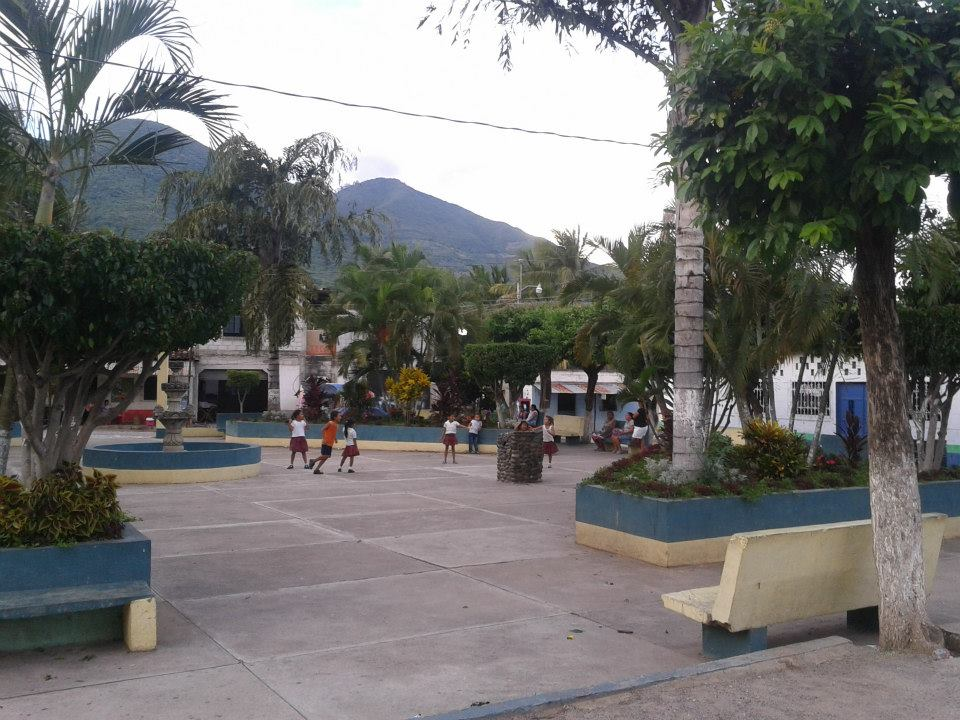
Park in Tulumaje

Tulumaje is a small village situated along the Rio Motagua, the largest river of Guatemala. This village is characterized by a predominantly hot and humid climate; droughts are rare, because of the abundant sources of water such as the Motagua river and Las Vegas river, both surrounding the place. The area is largely forested, bringing to the region frequent rainy days.

Tulumaje is situated in San Agustín Acasaguastlán, El Progreso Department, to the east of Guatemala City. It's composed of various neighborhoods. San Esteban is the most important one, with a big affluence of sawmill factories, providing the people with good opportunities of employment; different other families dedicate themselves to the livestock, having great amounts of cattle, which they feed at their own lands near river Motagua or Las Vegas. Those families as well own huge extensions of lands, on which they harvest lemon or other kinds of tropical fruits. Barrio El puente connects Barrio El lajal, and it is characterized to be right next to Puente Tulumaje, and the main entrance is often called Dona Chavelita by the people who get off the bus that run from El Progreso, Las Champas, or come from Morazan, Pasagua and Tulumajillo. Barrio El lajal is characterized to be a dry place, of rocky roads, and situated at a high hill with little forestation. Houses are made of adobe walls and tile roofs that provides a fresh environment. Barrio El campo is situated at the opposite side of the above-mentioned neighborhoods. It is also a dry place, with different facilities of access through well paved roads. El campo is a field where different soccer(football) matches are held; the football championship brings enjoyable moments to all Tulumajense people, and it invites different other villages to compete. Barrio El aripinal is right next to El campo, and it counts with different stores, and well paved roads as well. Barrio El centro is where people join for different kinds of activities held in Tulumaje. Great religious, traditional, and educational events are held through the year. The church faces the park, the primary school and the communal hall are directed to the main street; and different stores and pharmacies make an easy access to families get their everyday-goods. Cantinas are common in Tulumaje, and every weekend music is played out-loud by a rocola, and men play poker, drink until late night.

On May 29, 2010, Hurricane Agatha was the biggest natural disaster that hit this village, leaving to it huge losses to many families. Rio Motagua flooded and destroyed huge extensions of lands, houses and took with it all cattle that was being fed, horses, chicken farms, etc. It was a tense night, and many families stayed awake all night long waiting for that majestic river lower down its size. Guatemalan government provided help to all the affected families.
