= San Diego Municipality =

San Diego Municipality may refer to:

- San Diego, Cesar, Colombia
- San Diego, Zacapa, Guatemala
- San Diego Municipality, Carabobo, Venezuela
