= El Clásico Chapín =

Name for CSD Municipal and Comunicaciones FC rivalry

- Other names: El Clásico; El Clásico Nacional; El Derbi Guatemalteco
- Location: Guatemala City
- Teams: Comunicaciones FC; C.S.D. Municipal
- First meeting: Comunicaciones 2–1 Municipal (14 January 1951)
- Latest meeting: 10 August 2025; Municipal 1–1 Comunicaciones
- Next meeting: 19 October 2025
- Stadiums: Estadio Cementos Progreso (Comunicaciones FC); Estadio El Trébol (C.S.D. Municipal)

Statistics
- Total meetings: 334
- Most wins: Comunicaciones F.C. (114)
- Top scorer: Juan Carlos Plata (39)
- Largest victory: Comunicaciones 5–0 Municipal (5 August 1981); Municipal 7–3 Comunicaciones (2 June 1974)

El Clásico Chapin (English: The Classic Chapin), also known as the Guatemalan Derbi, El Clasico, El SuperClásico or El Juego De Juegos (Spanish language) is a football match between rivals Comunicaciones FC and C.S.D. Municipal. Comunicaciones and Municipal are the two most successful and influential football clubs in Guatemala.

== See also ==
- C.S.D. Comunicaciones
- Estadio Doroteo Guamuch Flores
