= San Pedro Necta =

San Pedro Nectá
- Location in Guatemala
- Coordinates: 15°29′31″N 91°46′02″W
- Country: Guatemala
- Department: Huehuetenango

Government
  - Mayor: Rony Galicia (URNG)

Population (2017)
  - Total: 36,827
- Climate: Cwb

San Pedro Nectá is a municipality in the Guatemalan department of Huehuetenango. It is a primarily ethnic Mam community.

== Notable residents ==
- Evelio López (1992–2026), Mam journalist.
