= Cabañas, Zacapa =

Municipality in Zacapa, Guatemala

Coordinates: 14.9333°N 89.8°W

Cabañas is a municipality in the Guatemalan department of Zacapa.

It is a small town of about 10,000, and income is mostly from farming.

The 2008 Aéreo Ruta Maya crash of a Cessna 208 after taking off from La Aurora International Airport (GUA / MGGT) close to Cabañas killed 11 passengers and crew.
