= Larry Dale Lee =

American journalist (1958–1999)

Larry Lee
- Born: October 16, 1958; Rockford, Illinois, US
- Died: December 28, 1999 (aged 41); Guatemala City, Guatemala
- Cause of death: Assassination by stabbing
- Education: University of Arkansas (BA); University of Missouri (MA, Journalism)
- Occupations: Financial & economic reporter
- Employer: BridgeNews
- Parent(s): Lehman Lee & Vera Lewis

Larry Dale Lee (16 October 1958 – 28 December 1999) was an American financial and economic journalist for BridgeNews who was found stabbed to death in his apartment in Guatemala City, Guatemala.

== Personal history ==
Lee was born in Rockford, Illinois, United States, and raised in Doniphan, Missouri. He graduated top of his class from Doniphan High School in 1976. Lee attended Emmanuel Baptist Church in his hometown of Doniphan. Family, friends and co-workers say that Lee had a strong interest in politics and social issues. He first graduated from the University of Arkansas, and then in the 1980s, he attended the University of Missouri, where he earned his graduate degree in journalism in 1987. He became fluent in Spanish. While working in Knoxville, Tennessee, in 1993, Lee revealed he was gay, but he did not inform his family.

== Career ==
Lee started his journalism career working for his home town newspaper, The Prospect-News, in Doniphan, Missouri, and then he worked at The Webb City Sentinel while working on his graduate degree in journalism until August 1986. He was an intern in 1987 at the Knoxville News-Sentinel, Knoxville, and he later returned to the newspaper as a copy editor and staff reporter and worked there continuously between 1989 and 1994. Lee's career took him to writing for newspapers in Tennessee, Arkansas, Texas, and Florida. During this period, he was employed as a journalist by the Southwest Times Record, Fort Smith, Arkansas; and then for a series of E. W. Scripps Company newspapers, including The Memphis Commercial Appeal, Memphis, Tennessee; El Paso Herald-Post, El Paso, Texas; San Antonio Express-News, San Antonio, Texas; and The Stuart News in Stuart, Florida.

In August 1998, Lee took a job as the correspondent for BridgeNews in Guatemala. At the time, BridgeNews was the second largest Financial news agency behind Reuters and it had reporters in about 100 countries. He was employed by BridgeNews at the time of his murder but he told friends he was in the process of selling his possessions and leaving Guatemala City for Mexico City and leaving journalism for a career in non-profit social services sector.

== Death ==
The red portion shows the location of the Department of Guatemala within the country.

Lee had been working on a story about the Guatemala presidential election. He filed his last story for BridgeNews at 10:30 p.m. on 26 December 1999. He sent his last email shortly after midnight on 27 December. On 28 December, a friend came to check on him in his Zone 1 neighborhood, 13th floor apartment, and when Lee did not answer his door, the friend asked a janitor to check on him, and Lee was discovered dead. Police found Lee naked and his body slashed in his Guatemala City apartment. Lee had been stabbed in the back, throat and multiple times on the side. The autopsy established the time of death to be on 28 December.

== Investigation ==
The police had no murder weapon, suspects and, since it was holidays and the neighborhood he lived in was quiet, no witnesses. There were several lines of motivations that were being investigated surrounding Lee's murder:

1. Robbery: Since Lee was leaving Guatemala, he had advertised his possessions for sale. His phone was among the stolen items. There was no security system in his apartment building and a friend who lived in Guatemala City said his neighborhood was dangerous at nights and few foreigners lived there.
2. Jealous lover or hate crime: After Lee was murdered, police discovered that he was gay. This led them to look into his sexual preference as a possible motivation, in the event that he was leaving a possible lover or that someone had targeted him because he was gay.
3. Journalism-related: The Committee to Protect Journalists has not determined whether or not the case was related to Lee's reporting on financial, social or political issues. One of his most damning stories was about a former leader committing human rights abuses.
4. Random crime: Another possibility is that he was not targeted for any particular reason, but rather that the crime came to him as a result of general lawlessness.

Ten years after Lee's murder, the Guatemalan police had no leads, made no arrests and family, friends and co-workers had complained that the case was not thoroughly or competently investigated. President George W. Bush brought up the issue of impunity in Lee's case, as well as other Americans killed in Guatemala over an 18-month period, but only 5 percent of urban murders are brought to a successful conclusion in that country.

== Context ==
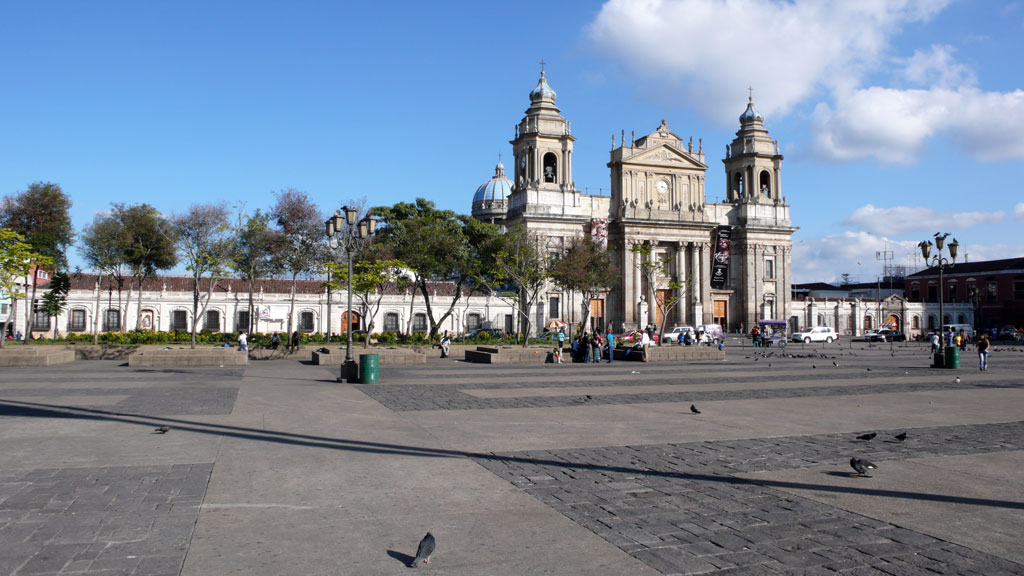
The Metropolitan Cathedral was close to where Lee was living in the Zone 1 neighborhood of Guatemala City.

In 1999, Larry Lee became the last of 37 journalists killed that year. And between Larry Lee's murder in 1999 and summer 2001, eight Americans were killed in Guatemala.

Lee's family filed a negligence case against Bridge Information Systems in April 2001. According to the lawsuit, BridgeNews had not responded to a policy that had established a set of procedures to follow if a reporter was not heard of after 24 hours. The time between Lee filing his last story and the time of death and discovery of his body were beyond the 24-hour-time period. BridgeNews denied any responsibility. In October 2001, Reuters bought Bridge Information Systems after the company had already filed bankruptcy.

== Impact ==
In 1990, Roy Aarons, an editor came out publicly at a conference of editors and went on to found the National Lesbian and Gay Journalists Association (NLGJA) in order ensure safe work environments for those who are members, promote respectful coverage and support gay and lesbian journalists in their professional pursuits.

== Reactions ==
The committee to Protect Journalists and family members have pointed out the flawed investigation. The CPJ criticized police for not requesting Lee's phone records that might have led to suspects. And Lee's brother, Scott Lee, who was the first family member to enter Lee's apartment after the murder, had found evidence, including blood that could have been tested by police.

Lee's sister Janine Zerger was critical of the Guatelmalan investigation: They did not investigate enough to know about his life. But the word gay conjures up images in their mind, so they thought of every negative thing they could say to prove this case is not worthy of solving.

Brian Harris, Lee's boss at BridgeNews at the time of his murder, said, "The U.S. Embassy in Guatemala City, while doing a good job in repatriating Larry's body, was slow to react to the case and has proven to be of little aid in seeing that justice is served...The Guatemalans have done an outstanding job in filling the file on Larry's case with reports, but poorly in substantively following leads in the case."

== Awards ==
Larry Lee won a Robert F. Kennedy Journalism Award for his articles about the economic plight of people living in the Bootheel region, which were published in both the St. Louis Post-Dispatch and The Columbia Missourian.

The Missouri School of Journalism has an award named after Larry Lee.

== See also ==
- List of journalists killed in Guatemala
- List of unsolved murders (1980–1999)
