= José Grajeda =

Guatemalan footballer

Personal information
- Full name: José Pablo Grajeda Salinas
- Date of birth: 23 January 2001 (age 25)
- Place of birth: Guatemala City, Guatemala
- Height: 1.78 m (5 ft 10 in)
- Position: Midfielder

Team information
- Current team: Comunicaciones
- Number: 8

Youth career
- Getafe
- 2017–2018: Rayo Vallecano
- 2018–2019: Calavera
- 2019: Real Betis

Senior career*
Years	Team	Apps	(Gls)
2022	Botev Vratsa	0	(0)
2022–2024	Antigua	60	(0)
2024–	Comunicaciones	20	(0)
- * Club domestic league appearances and goals as of 20:00, 17 August 2025 (UTC)

José Pablo Grajeda Salinas (born 23 January 2001) is Guatemalan professional footballer who plays as a midfielder for Liga Guate club Comunicaciones.

== Club career ==
=== Botev Vratsa ===
On 14 January 2022, Botev Vratsa announced the signing of Grajeda, making him the first Guatemalan to play in Bulgaria.

=== Comunicaciones ===
On 15 May 2024, Comunicaciones announced the official signing of Grajeda, making it their second of the upcoming season. The signing was met with high expectations due to his time in Spanish youth football.
