= Comunicaciones FC =

Association football club in Guatemala

Comunicaciones
- Full name: Comunicaciones Fútbol Club
- Nicknames: Los Cremas (The Creams); Los Albos (The Whites); El Hexacampeón (The Six-Time Champion); El Único Hexa (The Only Six-Time Champion); El Más Grande de Guatemala (The Biggest in Guatemala); La Pasion de Una Nacion Entera
- Short name: COM
- Founded: 16 August 1949; 77 years ago
- Ground: Estadio Cementos Progreso
- Capacity: 17,000
- Owner: Albavisión
- Chairman: Cristian Cáceres
- Manager: Marco Antonio Figueroa
- League: Liga Bantrab
- Apertura 2025: Regular phase: 12th Final phase: Did not qualify
- Website: comunicacionesfc.com
Home colours	Away colours	Third colours

Comunicaciones Fútbol Club (Latin American Spanish pronunciation: [komunikaˈsjones ˈfuðβol ˈkluβ]), commonly referred to as Comunicaciones, is a professional football club based in Guatemala City. The club competes in Liga Bantrab, the top tier of Guatemalan football.

The most popular and successful football club in Guatemala, Comunicaciones have won 32 national championships, the most of any Guatemalan club team, including six consecutive. In addition to their 32 league titles, Comunicaciones have won eight league cups and ten Supercups. In international competition, Comunicaciones have won two UNCAF Interclub Cups, one CONCACAF Champions Cup, and one CONCACAF League championship.

== History ==
Comunicaciones origins date 1920s Club Comunicaciones was formed in 1949 after Colonel Carlos Aldana Sandoval, then Minister of Telegraphs and Communications, took charge of the team and renamed it Comunicaciones ("Communications" in Spanish).

The club colour is white, which they began using in their kit shortly after the club's foundation, though initially the uniform was cream. Their historic arch-rival is Municipal and the two clubs compete in the El Clásico Chapín, one of the greatest rivalries in Guatemalan football. Their other fierce rivals consist of Antigua known as the El Clasico Provincial and a rivalry with Quetzaltenango club Xelajú as El Clásico del Oeste.

== Support ==
Since its inception, the Albo fans have been composed of the different strata of Guatemalan society. In the 80s, organized support began to take more momentum, at that time by batons that were located in different sectors of the stadium that were felt with songs, chopped paper, balloons and blankets, marking a different pattern of support from the fans of that time in Guatemalan football.

It was at that time when the nickname of the "Millionaire Fans" was popularised by fans of the club throughout the country. Currently, the cream fans are the only one in Guatemala who have adopted the type of South American breath in which everyone in the stadium sings in unison giving a unique atmosphere in the stands.

=== La barra brava ===
In the early 90s, the first organized support group called Fuerza Crema officially emerged, regularly located in the Preference area of the stadium, becoming the largest in the country with more than 2,500 members. It was until mid-1996 that after several differences between its leaders, the Albos force separated.

Some former members of the old group changed sectors in the stadium forming in the same year the barra Vltra Svr (Ultra Sur), a name it adopted due to its location in the General South area of the property. This group is characterized by the songs it provides to the team throughout the match, in addition to receptions, flags and walks, something that was not customary in Guatemalan football.

The barra has large blankets, flags, umbrellas, hype with murgas, trumpets, dubbing and a huge hype brought from Chile to encourage the club. In its beginnings the bar even hosted more than 3,000 members in transcendental matches.

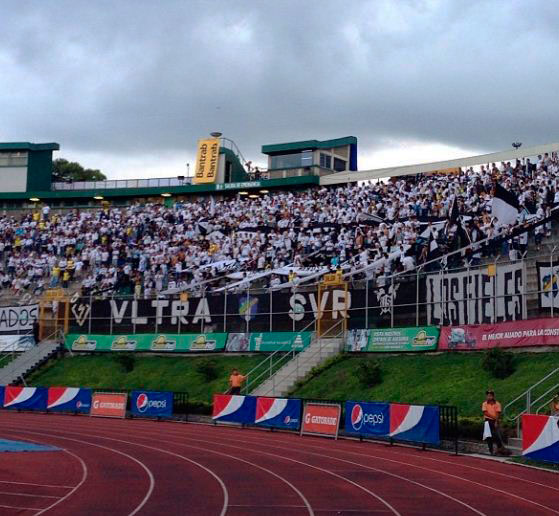
Vltra Svr at the 2013 Apertura final

== Rivalries ==
Their historic arch-rival is Municipal and the two clubs compete in the El Clásico Chapín, one of the greatest rivalries in Guatemalan football. Their other fierce rivals consist of Antigua known as the El Clasico Provincial and a rivalry with Quetzaltenango club Xelajú as El Clásico del Oeste.

== Mascot ==
=== Casper ===
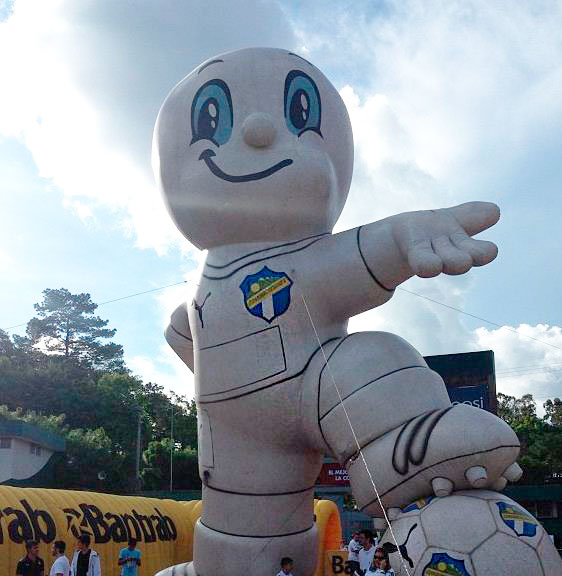
Giant inflatable of Casper

The mascot of Comunicaciones is the ghost Casper who has been accompanying the club since 1985. It was brought from Miami in September 1985 by the then president of the team, Teddy Plocharski, at a cost of $2,000 (15,392.65 Quetzales), being the first football club to use a mascot in Central America.

He first appeared at the Doroteo Guamuch on September 8, 1985, for the 124th edition of the Clásico Chapín, in which Comunicaciones beat Municipal by 3 to 1. The suit has undergone three transformations since its creation, the first in 1995 and the second 1998, this being the one that is maintained today.

== Stadium ==
The team currently play their home games at the Estadio Cementos Progreso, which holds at a capacity of 17,000, where their B team used to play. Before 2023, they played at the Estadio Doroteo Guamuch Flores, which is also the home of the Guatemala national football team.

== Honours ==
=== National ===
- Liga Bantrab
  - Champions (32): 1956, 1957–58, 1959–60, 1968–69, 1970–71, 1971, 1972, 1977, 1979–80, 1981, 1982, 1985–86, 1990–91, 1994–95, 1996–97, 1997–98, 1998–99, 1999 Apertura, 2001 Clausura, 2002 Apertura, 2003 Clausura, 2008 Apertura, 2010 Apertura, 2011 Clausura, 2012 Apertura, 2013 Clausura, 2013 Apertura, 2014 Clausura, 2014 Apertura, 2015 Clausura, 2022 Clausura, 2023 Apertura
  - Runners-up (26): 1950–51, 1952–53, 1954–55, 1961–62, 1965–66, 1975, 1976, 1978, 1983, 1991–92, 1992–93, 1995–96, Clausura 2000, Apertura 2000, Clausura 2002, Apertura 2003, Apertura 2004, Apertura 2005, Apertura 2006, Clausura 2008, Apertura 2009, 2011 Apertura, 2016 Clausura, 2018 Apertura, 2021 Clausura, 2021 Apertura
- Copa de Guatemala
  - Champions (8): 1951–52, 1955, 1970, 1972, 1983, 1986, 1991–92, 2009
  - Runners-up (1): 1972–73
- Copa Campeón de Campeones de Guatemala
  - Champions (10): 1955, 1956, 1958, 1961, 1983, 1986, 1991, 1995, 1997, 1998
  - Runners-up (4): 1952, 1984, 1986, 2024

=== International ===
==== Continental ====
- CONCACAF Champions Cup
  - Champions (1): 1978
  - Runners up (2): 1962, 1969
- CONCACAF League
  - Champions (1): 2021
- CONCACAF Cup Winners Cup
  - Runners-up (1): 1991

==== Regional ====
- Copa Fraternidad/Copa Interclubes UNCAF
  - Champions (2): 1971, 1983
  - Runners up (3): 1976, 1977, 2003

=== Awards ===
- CONCACAF League Fair Play: 2021

== Performance in CONCACAF competitions ==
- CONCACAF Champions Cup: 28 appearances

Best results: 1978–Champions; 1962, 1969–Runners-up
Most recent participation: 2024–First Round

- CONCACAF League: 4 appearances

2019: Quarter-finals
2020: First Round
2021: Champions
2022: Round of 16

- CONCACAF Central American Cup: 1 appearance

2023: Quarter-finals

- CONCACAF Cup Winners Cup: 2 appearances

1991: Runners-up
2001: Semi-finals (Note: This last edition of the tournament was played under the title of "CONCACAF Giants Cup".)

== Players ==
=== Current squad ===
As of 3 June 2026

Note: Flags indicate national team as defined under FIFA eligibility rules; some limited exceptions apply. Players may hold more than one non-FIFA nationality.

No.	Pos.	Nation	Player
1	GK	GUA	Fredy Pérez
2	DF	GUA	Walter García
3	DF	GUA	Elsar Martín
4	MF	CUB	Karel Espino
5	DF	GUA	Marco Domínguez
6	DF	GUA	José Carlos Pinto (vice-captain)
7	FW	MEX	Gael Sandoval
8	MF	GUA	José Grajeda
9	FW	COL	Omar Malisimo Duarte
11	FW	GUA	Andersson Ortiz
12	DF	GUA	Erick González
13	MF	GUA	Stheven Robles
14	DF	GUA	Rafael Morales

No.	Pos.	Nation	Player
20	MF	CUB	Dairon Reyes
21	GK	GUA	Josemaria Calderón
22	DF	GUA	Wilson Pineda
23	GK	GUA	Arnold Barrios
24	DF	MEX	Ernesto Monreal
25	FW	GUA	Erick Lemus
28	DF	COL	José Corena
30	DF	GUA	Emerson Raymundo
32	DF	GUA	Andy Domínguez
33	DF	GUA	Andy Contreras
35	FW	GUA	Edy Palencia
40	GK	GUA	Jorge Moreno
82	FW	PAN	Janpol Morales
91	FW	COL	Deyner Padilla

== Personnel ==
=== Current technical staff ===
Role	Staff
Head coach	(Mexico) Roberto Montoya
Second coach	(Guatemala)
Assistant coach	(Guatemala)
Assistant technical & fitness coach	(Guatemala)
Performance manager	(Guatemala)
Physical coach	(Guatemala)
Analyst	(Guatemala)
Technical assistant coach	(Guatemala)
Technical analyst	(Guatemala)
Goalkeeping coach	(Guatemala)
Recovery specialist	(Guatemala)

- Last updated: 15 January 2026

== Managerial history ==
- (Spain) José Casés Penadés (1917- + 2008) (1951–1954)
- (Guatemala) Federico Morales (1955–1956)
- (Spain) José Casés Penadés (1956–1960)
- (Guatemala) Carlos Enrique Wellman (1968–1969)
- (Peru) Walter Ormeño (1970–1971)
- (Argentina) Carmelo Faraone (1971)
- (Peru) Walter Ormeño (1972)
- (Uruguay) Rubén Amorín (1977–1978)
- (Peru) Walter Ormeño (1979–1980)
- (Guatemala) Jorge Lainfiesta (1981–1982)
- (Argentina) Salvador Pericullo (1983)
- (Paraguay) Ranulfo Miranda (1985)
- (Guatemala) Carlos Enrique Wellman (1990–1991)
- (Argentina) Raúl Héctor Cocherari (1991)
- (Chile) Hernán Godoy (1992)
- (Argentina) Juan Ramón Verón (1994–1995)
- (Uruguay) Carlos Miloc (1996–1997)
- (Argentina) Juan Ramón Verón (1997–1998)
- (Argentina) Carlos de Toro (1998)
- (Uruguay) Carlos Miloc (1998–1999)
- (Costa Rica) Alexandre Guimarães (1999)
- (Montenegro) Dušan Drašković (2000–2001)
- (Mexico) Alberto Aguilar (2001)
- (Argentina) Horacio Cordero (2002–2003)
- (Uruguay) Antonio Alzamendi (2004)
- (Uruguay) Luis Cubilla (2005)
- (Argentina) Miguel Ángel Brindisi (2005–2007)
- (Uruguay) Julio César Cortés
- (Uruguay) Julio González (2009–2010)
- (Argentina) Iván Sopegno (2010–2011)
- (Costa Rica) Rónald González (2011–2012)
- (Argentina) Iván Sopegno (2013–2014)
- (Uruguay) Willy Coito Olivera (2014–2015)
- (Argentina) Iván Sopegno (2015–2017)
- (Costa Rica) Rónald González (2017–2018)
- (Uruguay) Willy Coito Olivera (2018–2019)
- (Argentina) Mauricio Tapia (2019–2021)
- (Uruguay) Willy Coito Olivera (2021–2023)
- (Argentina) Iván Sopegno (2024)
- (Uruguay) Willy Coito Olivera (2024)
- (Costa Rica) Rónald González (2024– May 2025)
- (Mexico) Roberto Hernández (May 2025– October 2025)
- (Argentina) Iván Sopegno (October 2025 – December 2025)
- (Chile) Marco Antonio Figueroa (December 2025–present)
