= Usumatlán =

- Municipality
- Location within Guatemala
- Coordinates: 14°56′56″N 89°46′36″W
- Country: Guatemala
- Department: Zacapa

Usumatlán (Spanish pronunciation: [usumaˈtlan]) is a municipality in the Guatemalan department of Zacapa. In 2013, the population was 11,045.
