= Estanzuela =

Municipality in Zacapa Department, Guatemala

Coordinates: 15°N 89.5667°W

Estanzuela (Spanish pronunciation: [estanˈswela]) is a municipality in the Guatemalan department of Zacapa. It is a small town. Estanzuela was a passing place for Spaniards looking to go farther west to the ocean. A group of these Spaniards decided to rest for a while and thought Estanzuela to be the perfect location. As they went through the surroundings they saw that it was good land to harvest, so they decided to stay. At first, it was called "La Estancia". It is said that its second name was "La Estanzuelita," a Spanish diminutive of estancia, which is translated to resting place. Later, the name developed to today's name Estanzuela.

Estanzuela's weather is warm and mostly dry. The highest temperature to have ever been recorded in Guatemala, 45.0 °C (113.0 °F), was recorded here. The lowest temperature ever recorded was 7.0 °C (44.6 °F). Estanzuela receives 652.3 millimetres (25.68 in) of rainfall annually and has an average humidity of 70%.

People are friendly. Their lifestyle revolves around being football (soccer) fanatics and sharing good times with their neighbors as it is a small town. The workforce in Estanzuela varies as they have all sorts of skilled citizens who help each other improve their quality of life and it just keeps developing.

Estanzuela is also home to a modest museum of archeology.

With a population of 11,140 and an area covering 92.4 km², Estanzuela has a density of 120.56 people per square kilometer.
