= Evelio López =

Guatemalan journalist (1992–2026)

Evelio Lisandro López Sánchez (c. 1992–2026) was a Guatemalan journalist. A member of the Mam people, he was the founder of the digital news outlet Huehue es Noticias, which reported on local news in the Huehuetenango Department of Guatemala.

== Personal life ==
López was one of 12 children born into a Mam family in San Pedro Necta, a municipality in Huehuetenango. He had a daughter. López previously worked as a municipal communications officer during the mayoral tenure of Julio Ambrosio before becoming a journalist.

== Career ==
López was the founder and administrator of Huehue es Noticias, an online news outlet that reported on municipal, sports and cultural news in Huehuetenango, as well as on the Catholic Church. In addition to contributing reports and columns, López was also a sports journalist, in addition to serving as a referee during football games in San Pedro Necta and the surrounding area.

López was a member of the Huehuetenango Press Association, an organisation of journalists based in the region. In 2023, it named López as its Journalist of the Year.

== Murder and aftermath ==
López had filed criminal complaints with the National Civil Police dating back to 2021 due to threats he received as a result of his reporting, often from individuals associated with local politics. None of these complaints resulted in criminal convictions.

On the evening of 2 October 2026, López was shot dead while travelling home in San Pedro Necta. It was reported that a private vehicle had intercepted him, resulting in López being shot multiple times. He was 34 at the time of his death. The shooting occurred days after López publicly reported on death threats made against him, as confirmed in a statement from the Association of Guatemalan Journalists. It marked the second murder of a journalist in Guatemala in 2026, following the shooting of freelance journalist Carlos Humberto Cal Ical in Alta Verapaz on 26 April.

Following news of López's killing spreading, residents in San Pedro Necta set fire to a local police station, in addition to the home where a man locally suspected of being involved in the shooting was believed to be staying; the individual, reported to have been employed by the local government, subsequently handed himself in at a local police station. The Huehuetenango Press Association, of which he had been a member, filed a complaint with the public prosecutor, and demanded that authorities review previous criminal complaints López had made related to death threats against him. It also released a statement querying why officials from the Attorney General of Guatemala's office did not arrive at the crime scene until the following morning after López's death, expressing concern that this delay could have caused evidence to be lost or tampered with.

The Committee to Protect Journalists called on Guatemalan authorities to "swiftly and credibly" investigate López's killing, as did Reporters Without Borders. The National Civil Police stated it had set up a specialised criminal investigation team working alongside the Public Prosecutor's Office to identify and locate those responsible for López's killing, but that no suspect had yet been identified. The United States embassy in Guatemala called on authorities to clarify the circumstances of López's death. The Guatemalan government and the President of Guatemala, Bernardo Arévalo, condemned López's killing and called on the relevant authorities to investigate, expressing solidarity with his family.
