= Rolando Santiz =

Rolando Ardani Santiz de León was a Guatemalan television journalist who was murdered in Guatemala City on April 1, 2009.

== Career ==
Santiz worked as a reporter for more than 30 years and, according to the Committee to Protect Journalists, “was well-known in Guatemala.” During the last 15 years of his life he covered “the police beat.” At the time of his death, he was a reporter for the news program “Telecentro Trece” on the national television station Telecentro 13, on which he often covered graphic crime stories.

Santiz was also a volunteer firefighter.

== Murder ==
Santiz and his cameraman, Juan Antonio de León Villatoro, were driving in a company-owned vehicle at around 5:10 pm on April 1, 2009. They had just been covering the murder of a suburban bus driver in Alameda IV colony, Zone 18, and were heading back to their workplace in Guatemala City when two people riding motorcycles shot at them repeatedly. The assault took place at 4th Avenue and 20th Street in Zone 1 of the capital city. Santiz was struck four times and killed; de León Villatoro was struck three times and wounded. The murderers, who were later described as “two hired thugs,” “shot at the car repeatedly, killing Santiz immediately and injuring de León in the head, jaw, and chest.” Santiz was pronounced dead at the scene. De León was taken to the Hospital General San Juan de Dios, where he was reported as being in stable condition. He was put into protective custody.

Santiz was 52 years old when he died. He had told his colleagues about receiving death threats, but it was not clear whether the threats were linked to a specific story.

The Committee to Protect Journalists called on Guatemalan authorities to conduct an immediate and thorough investigation into the crime. “We are saddened by the death of Rolando Santiz and send our condolences to his friends and family,” said Robert Mahoney, CPJ's deputy director. “Guatemalan authorities must ensure that the investigation into Santiz's killing is thorough and provide Antonio de León with the ongoing necessary protection to assure that he is able to continue working as a journalist.” Ileana Alamilla, the coordinator of CERIGUA's Journalist's Observatory (Observatorio de los Periodistas), called for the perpetrators to be arrested and punished. According to IFEX, “Alamilla said that journalists no longer believe in the promises of upper level authorities or in security plans proposed by the government. Journalists are demanding concrete actions to stop the violence inherent in the environment in which they work every day.” Similarly, the vice president of the Inter American Press Association (IAPA), Gonzalo Marroquín, “demanded that the authorities investigate the crime to end the impunity that so often prevails in these types of cases.”

“Hundreds of people, including politicians, union members, journalists, firefighters and citizens, congregated at the funeral home in Guatemala's capital city where the journalist's body was taken in order to offer their condolences to Santiz's wife, Lorena Ramírez,” stated IFEX, which noted that Ramírez's father, Héctor Ramírez, known as “Reporter X,” had been killed in violent protests in 2003.

On June 8, 2009, the Committee to Protect Journalists reported that Guatemalan authorities had not made public any leads in the case. In January 2010, the CPJ also reported that the motive for the murder still remained “unconfirmed.”

2009 was Guatemala's most violent year in recent history, with 6,451 homicide victims, including several journalists. “After Rolando Santiz was assassinated, attacks against journalists have increased,” Raúl Morales, a journalist with Radio Sonora, said in April 2010. “When I leave my house, I look all around to be sure there is no one around me.” Gonzalo Marroquín, vice president of the Inter-American Press Association and director of the Guatemalan daily newspaper Prensa Libre, said that the situation had become so dangerous that journalism in Guatemala was on the way to extinction.
