= Huité =

Municipality in Guatemala

Coordinates: 14°56′N 89°43′W

Huité (Spanish pronunciation: [wiˈte]) is a municipality in the Guatemalan department of Zacapa. In 2013, the population was 9,853.
