= San Diego, Zacapa =

San Diego
- Municipality
- Location within Guatemala
- Coordinates: 14°46′59.88″N 89°46′59.88″W
- Country: Guatemala
- Department: Zacapa

San Diego is a municipality in the Zacapa Department in Guatemala. In 2013, the population was 5,931.
