= Guastatoya =

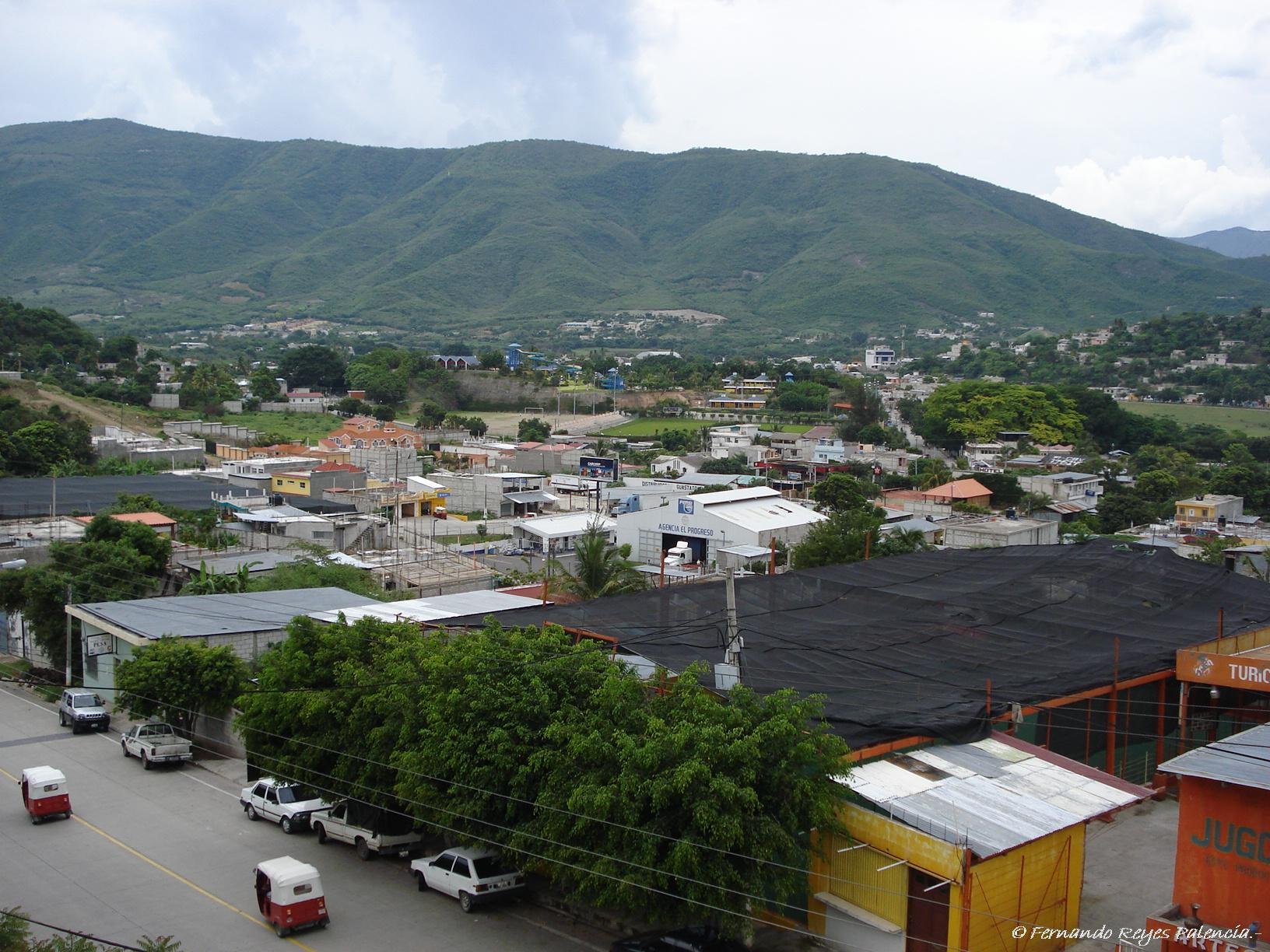
- View of Guastatoya

- Location in Guatemala
- Coordinates: 14°51′N 90°04′W
- Country: Guatemala
- Department: El Progreso

Government
  - Mayor: Jorge Orellana

Population (2018)
  - Total: 24,831
- Climate: BSh

Guastatoya is a city in Guatemala. It is the capital and the most populous city of the department of El Progreso. The Guastatoya Water Park is located in the city. The city was leveled in 1976 by an earthquake with a moment magnitude of 7.5. Guastatoya is located 73 km from Guatemala City.

== Sports ==
Deportivo Guastatoya football club play in the first tier of Guatemalan football. Their home venue is the Estadio David Cordón Hichos.
