= El Progreso Department =

Department of Guatemala

Coordinates: 14°51′14″N 90°04′07″W

El Progreso Department Departmento de El Progreso
- Department of Guatemala
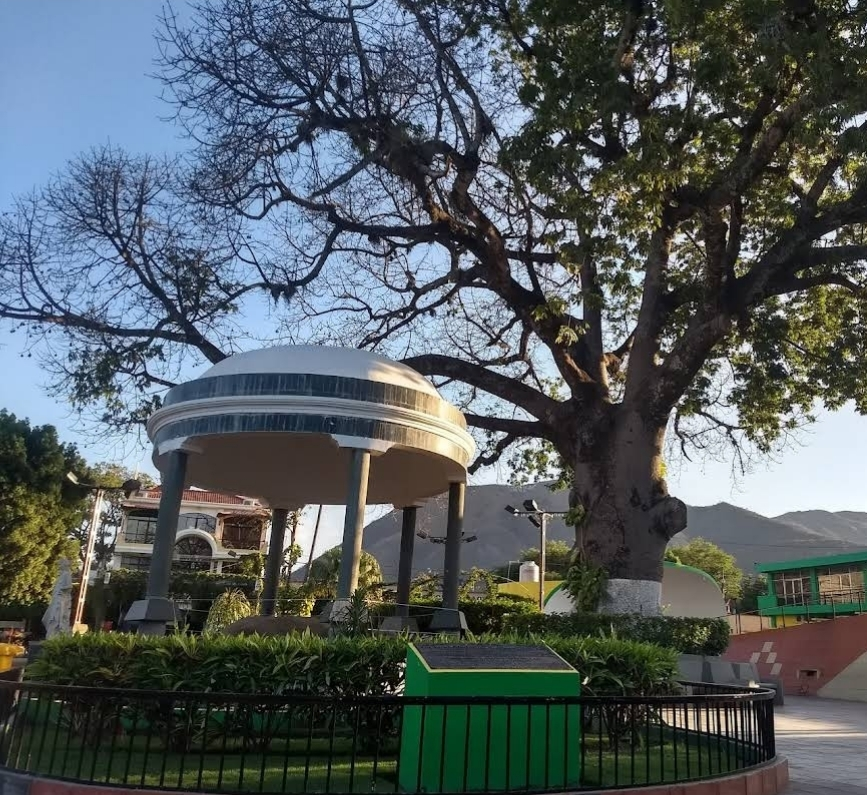
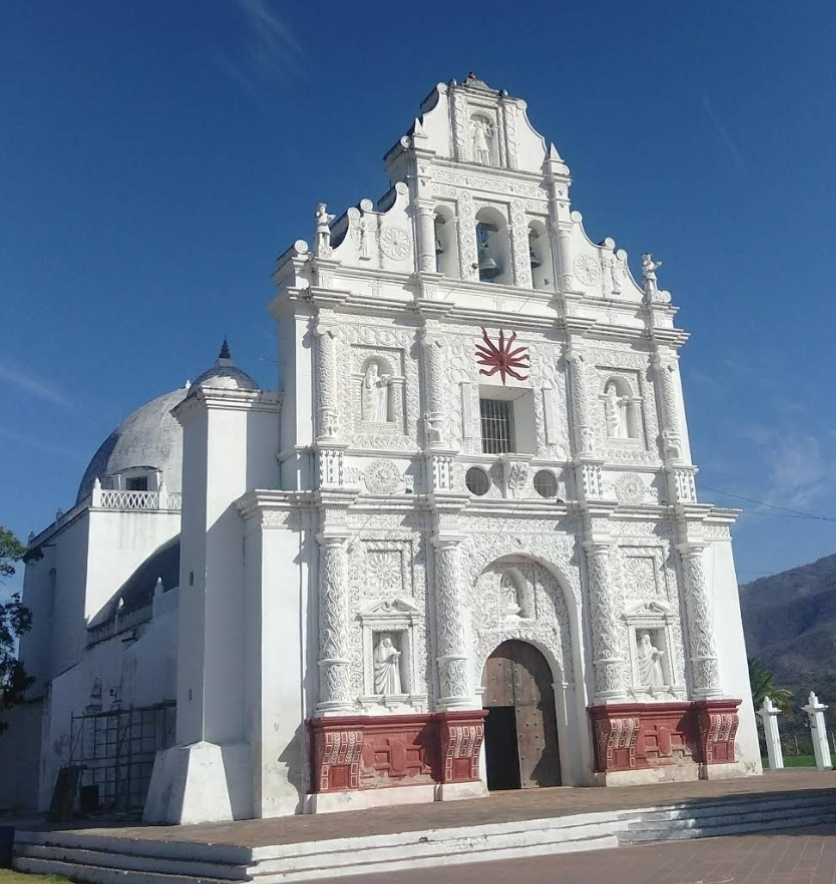
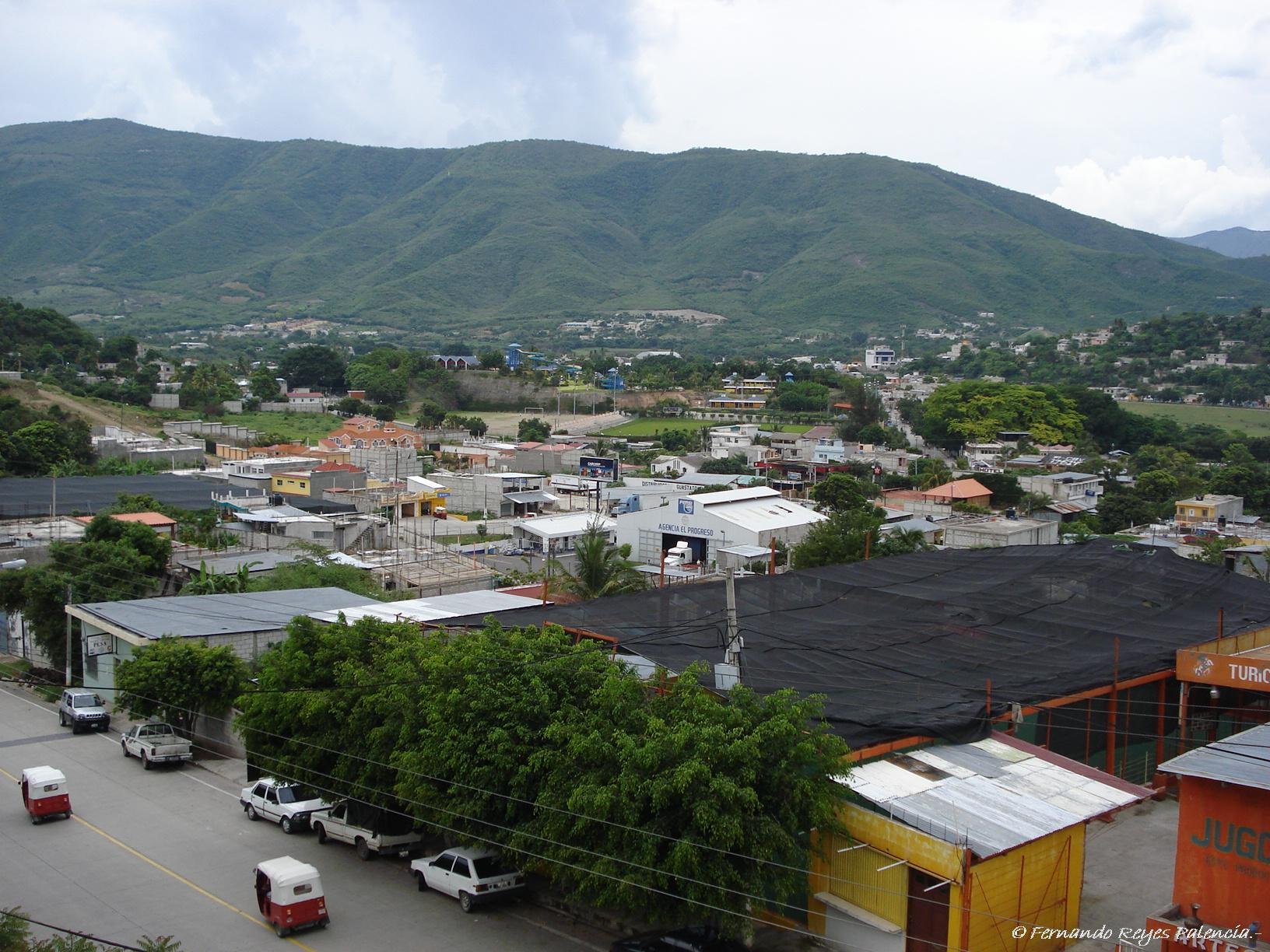
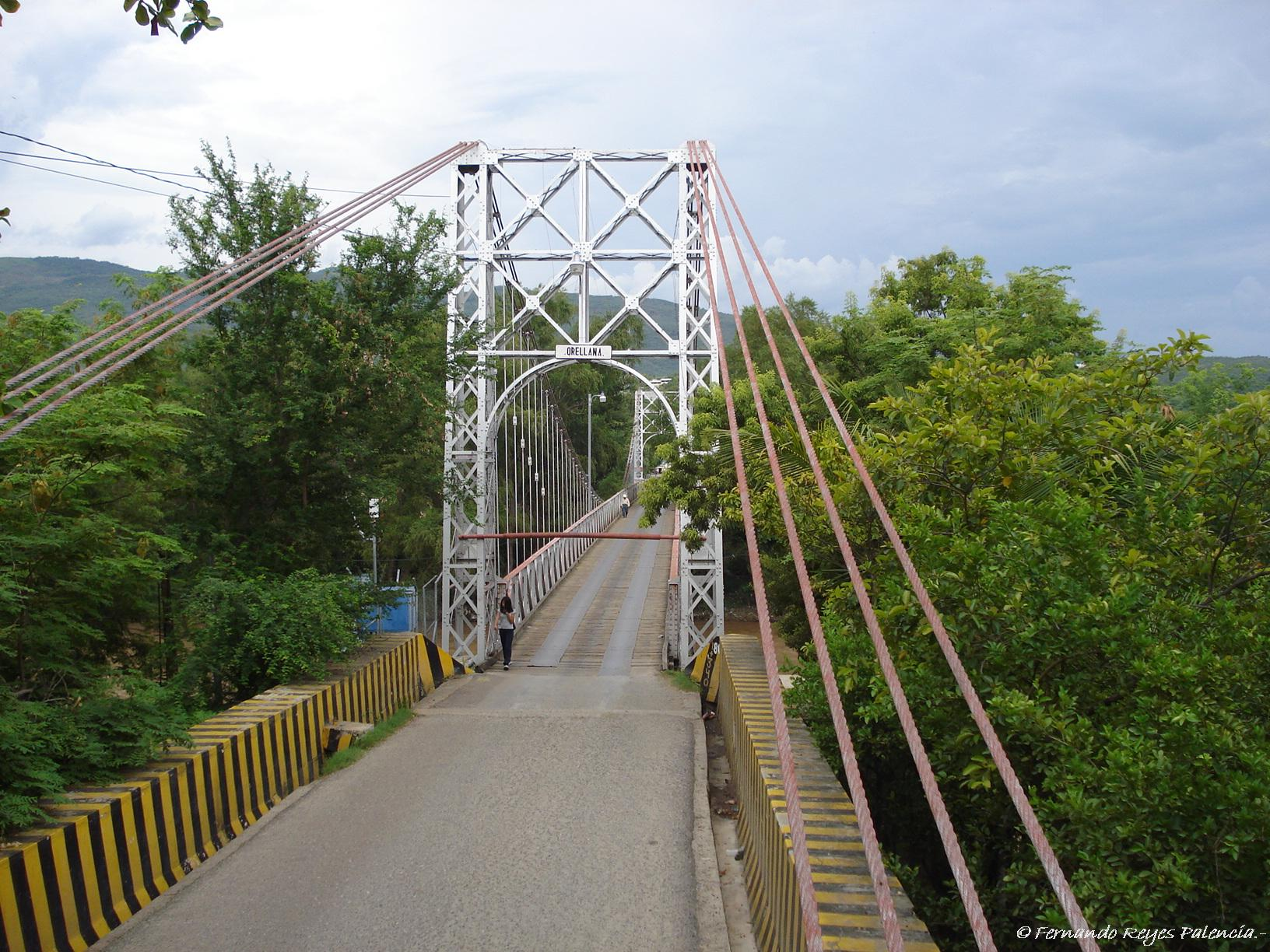
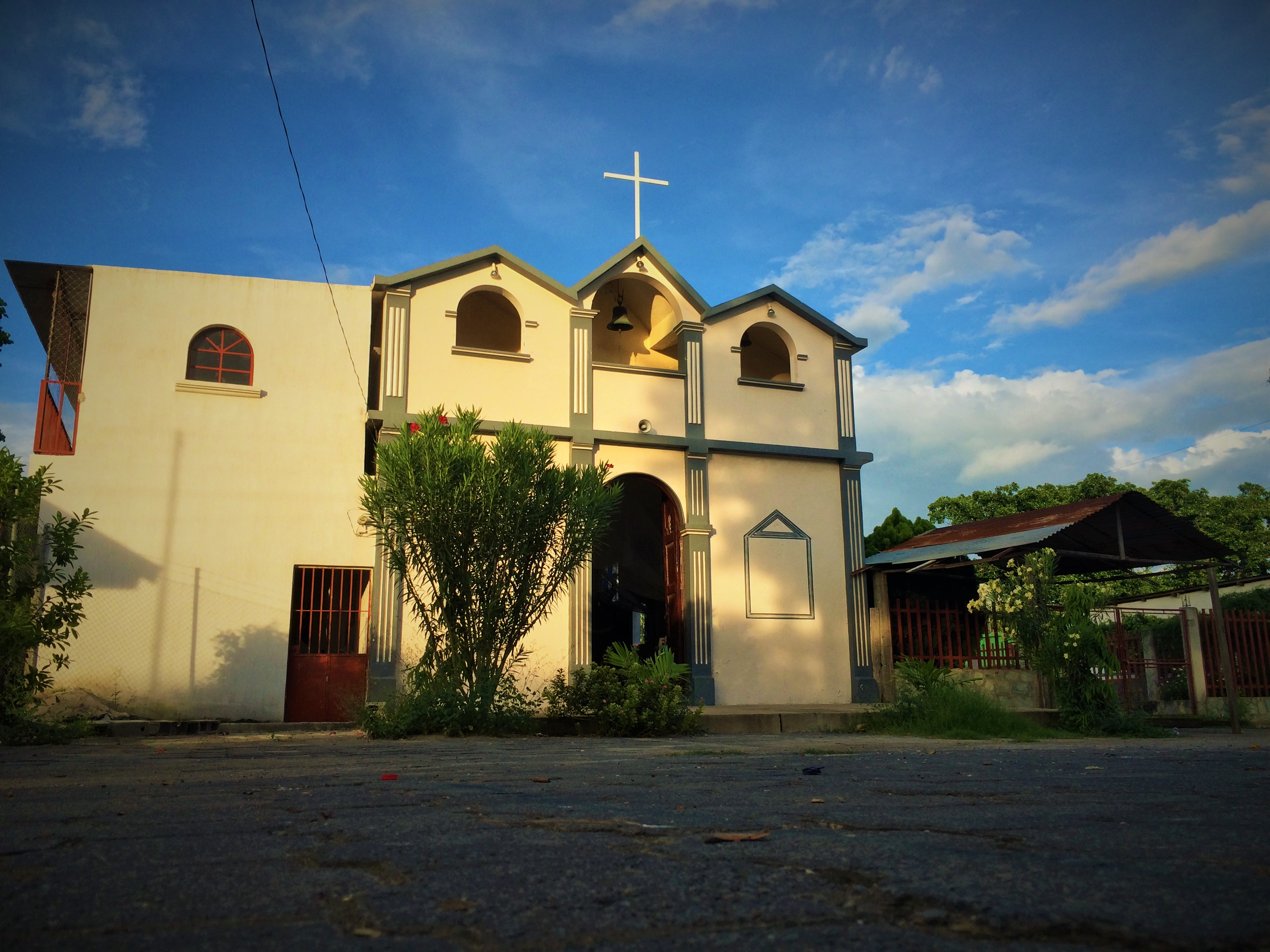
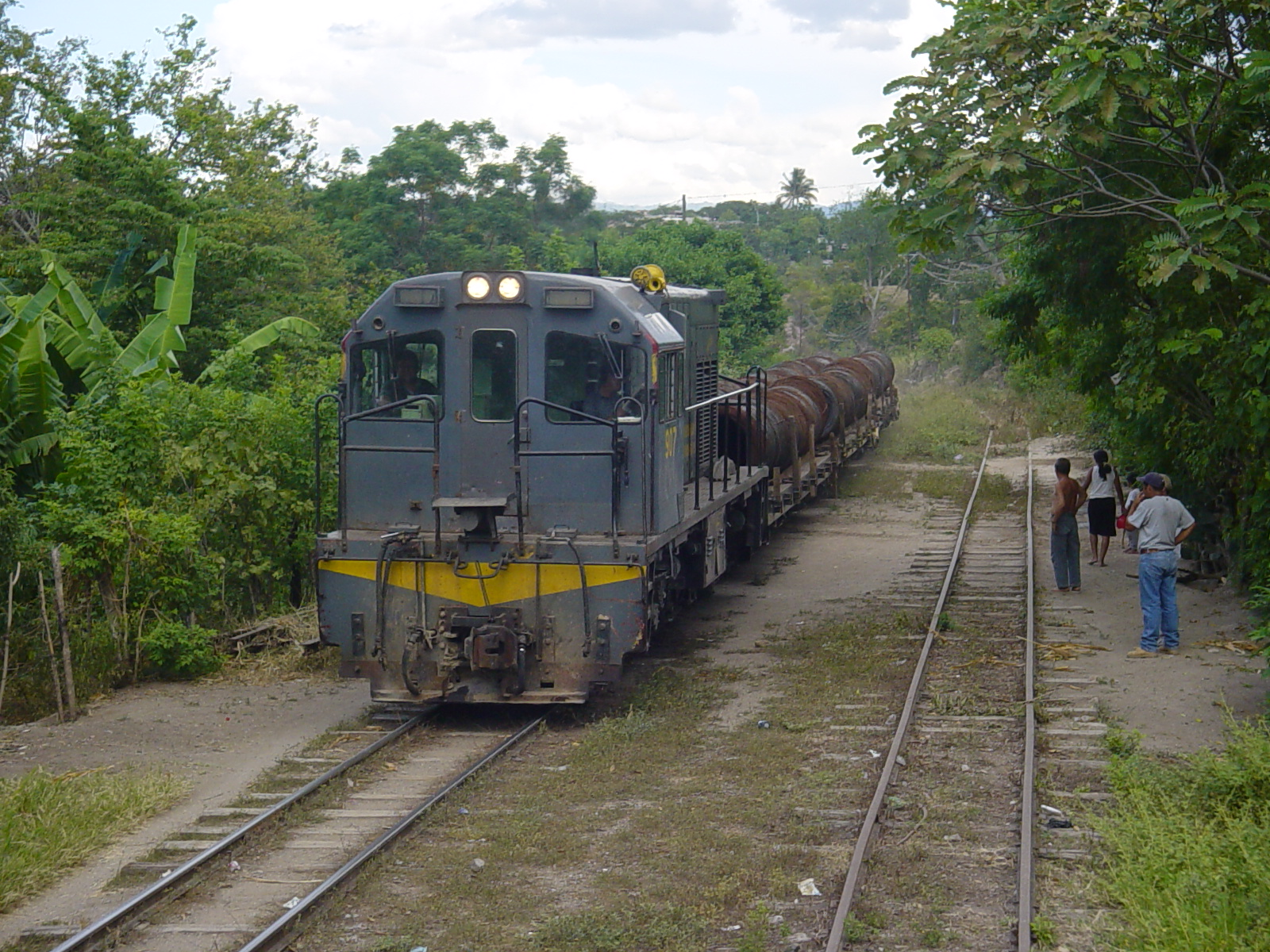
- Park Guastatoya Cathedral San Cristóbal Acasaguastlán Guastatoya Orellana Bridge Tulumajillo Church Railway Sanarate

- Flag Coat of arms

- El Progreso
- Country: Guatemala
- Capital: Guastatoya
- Largest settlement: San Agustín Acasaguastlán

Government
  - Type: Departmental

Area
  - Department of Guatemala: 1,922 km^{2} (742 sq mi)

Population (2018)
  - Department of Guatemala: 176,632
  - Density: 91.90/km^{2} (238.0/sq mi)
  - Urban: 91,416
  - Religions: Roman Catholicism Evangelicalism Maya
- Time zone: UTC-6

El Progreso (Spanish pronunciation: [el pɾoˈɣɾeso]) is a department in Guatemala. The departmental capital is Guastatoya. The Spanish established themselves in the region by 1551, after the Spanish conquest of Guatemala. El Progreso was declared a department in 1908, but was dissolved in 1920 before being reestablished in 1934. Guastatoya was badly affected by the 1976 Guatemala earthquake.

The department is located in northeastern Guatemala. It is bordered by the departments of Alta Verapaz, Baja Verapaz, Guatemala, Jalapa, and Zacapa. The department occupies an intermediate zone between the hot lowlands and the cooler Guatemalan Highlands, and has a generally hot climate. The most important river is the Motagua. To the north, the department is crossed by the Sierra de las Minas mountain range. The main population centres in El Progreso are Guastatoya, Sanarate and San Agustín Acasaguastlán. The CA-9 Atlantic Highway links the department with Guatemala City and the Atlantic port of Puerto Barrios.

The vast majority of the population of the department are Spanish-speaking Ladinos. The population is growing, but at a rate below the national average. At the same time, the illiteracy rate is falling.

== History ==
Historically, the area now included in the department of El Progreso was known as Guastatoya or Huastatoya, derived from Nahuatl huäxyötl or huäxin ("calabash") and atoyac ("last"), meaning the last place that calabashes grow, a reference to the change in altitude that occurs in the department, and corresponding climatic change from cold to hot.

=== Early history ===
The Spanish colonial corregimiento of San Cristóbal Acasaguastlán was established in 1551 with its seat in the town of that name, in what is now the eastern portion of the modern department. Most of the area of the modern department fell within the corregimiento of Chiquimula. Acasaguastlán was one of few pre-conquest centres of population in the middle Motagua River drainage, due to the arid climate. In El Progreso it included San Agustín de la Real Corona (modern San Agustín Acasaguastlán) and La Magdalena, but covered a broad area that also included parts of Baja Verapaz and Zacapa. San Cristóbal Acasaguastlán and the surrounding area were reduced into colonial settlements by friars of the Dominican Order; at the time of the conquest the area was inhabited by Poqomchi' Maya and by the Nahuatl-speaking Pipil. In the 1520s, immediately after conquest, the inhabitants paid taxes to the Spanish Crown in the form of cacao, textiles, gold, silver and slaves. Within a few decades taxes were instead paid in beans, cotton and maize. Acasaguastlán was first given in encomienda to conquistador Diego Salvatierra in 1526. The region was subject to a strong influx of Spanish colonists due to its location on the route between the colonial capital and the Caribbean Sea, and hence to Spain, resulting in the hispanicisation of the territory. Guastatoya was mentioned as a village in an edict issued in Santiago de los Caballeros de Guatemala, the colonial capital, in 1758. In 1825, various settlements were integrated into the Acasagustlán district that would later be included in El Progreso department. In the 1870s, the territory was divided between the departments of Guatemala, Zacapa and Chiquimula.

=== Departmental history ===
The department of El Progreso was created by executive decree on 13 April 1908, to include the municipalities of Acasaguastlán, Cabañas, Guastatoya (which was renamed as El Progreso), Morazán, Sanarate, Sansaria (now known as Sansare), San Antonio La Paz, and San José El Golfo. For a short time from December 1919 to June of the following year, the department was renamed Estrada Cabrera at the request of its constituent municipalities, in order to honour the then-president. On 9 June 1920, after the president was overthrown, the department was dissolved by the government. The municipalities that it had incorporated were returned to their previous jurisdictions. The department was reestablished on 3 April 1934 by the legislative assembly.

The departmental capital of Guastatoya was badly affected by the 1976 Guatemala earthquake, which completely destroyed all historic architecture in the town.

== Geography ==
The department of El Progreso is located in northeastern Guatemala. It is bordered to the southwest by the department of Guatemala, to the southeast by Jalapa, to the east by Zacapa, to the west by Baja Verapaz, and to the north by the department of Alta Verapaz. The departmental capital is Guastatoya. The department occupies an intermediate zone between the hot lowlands and the cooler Guatemalan Highlands. It has a surface area of approximately 1,922 square kilometres (742 sq mi).

The terrain is varied, with altitude varying between 245 and 1,240 metres (804 and 4,068 ft) above mean sea level. The department has a generally hot climate. The most important river is the Motagua. Other rivers in El Progreso include the Hato, Huija, Huyús, Las Ovejas, Morazán, Plátanos, and Sanarate rivers. To the north of the Motagua, the department is crossed by the Sierra de las Minas mountain range. The highest point in the department is Cerro El Pinalón, in the Sierra de las Minas, at 2,962 metres (9,718 ft).

The main population centres in El Progreso are Sanarate, Guastatoya, and San Agustín Acasaguastlán. The CA-9 Atlantic Highway crosses the department from west to east, en route from Guatemala City to the Atlantic port of Puerto Barrios. Other principal highways are the CA-17 from El Rancho towards Cobán, and the RN-19 from Sanarate towards Jalapa.

== Population ==
According to the 2018 census, the population of El Progreso was 176,632. In 2013, the non-indigenous proportion of the population was 98.2% against 1.8% indigenous. The majority of the population consists of Spanish-speaking Ladinos, although some traces of indigenous culture survive, such as in modes of dress, linguistic traces, and local customs and beliefs. By 2013 the total population had grown to 163,537. The 2012–2013 population growth rate was 1.73%, below the national average of 2.32%. By gender, 51.9% of the population are female, and 48.1% male. The majority of the population, 59.8%, lives in the rural portion of the department. The predominant language in El Progreso is Guatemalan Spanish. In 2013, 89.2% of the population were recorded as literate, with a year-on-year drop in illiteracy from 16.1% in 2009.

=== Mortality ===
In 2013, 930 deaths were registered in the department, demonstrating a 3.5% drop on the previous year, and 1.3% of the national total:

Mortality in 2013
Cause	%
Heart attack	32.2%
Diabetes mellitus	10.7%
Pneumonia	10.5%
Stroke	9.7%
Assault with firearm	9.7%
Stomach cancer	6.6%
Unspecified	6.6%
Liver cancer	6%
Liver cirrhosis/fibrosis	4.6%
Vehicular accident	3.4%

== Economy and agriculture ==
Agricultural products include coffee, sugar cane, tobacco, maize, beans, cacao, annatto, tomatoes, vanilla, cotton, and a variety of other fruits. Tomato production is especially important in El Progreso, representing 6% of the national total. Local craft production includes basketwork, ropemaking, leatherwork, items fashioned from palm, and tulle netting. Sanarate has the greatest economic production in the department, followed by Guastatoya, then San Agustín Acasaguastlán.

== Tourism ==
Local tourist attractions include thermal baths near Sanarate and San Antonio La Paz.

== Archaeological sites ==
The best preserved archaeological site in the region is Guaytán, which was inhabited from the Late Preclassic to the Late Classic periods of Mesoamerican chronology (approximately from 250 BC to 900 AD), and was an important centre for the distribution of jade.

== Municipalities ==
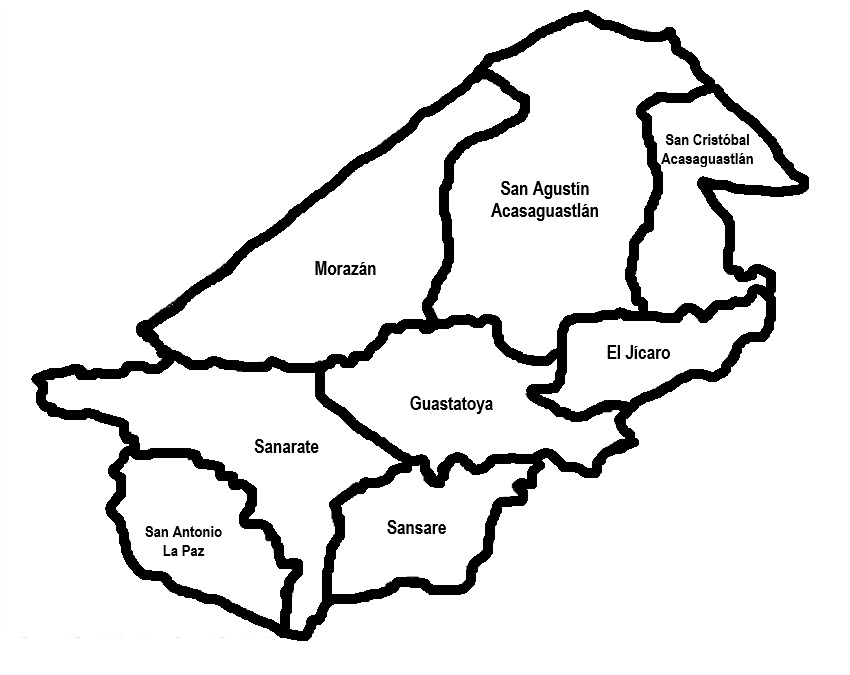
Location of the Municipalities

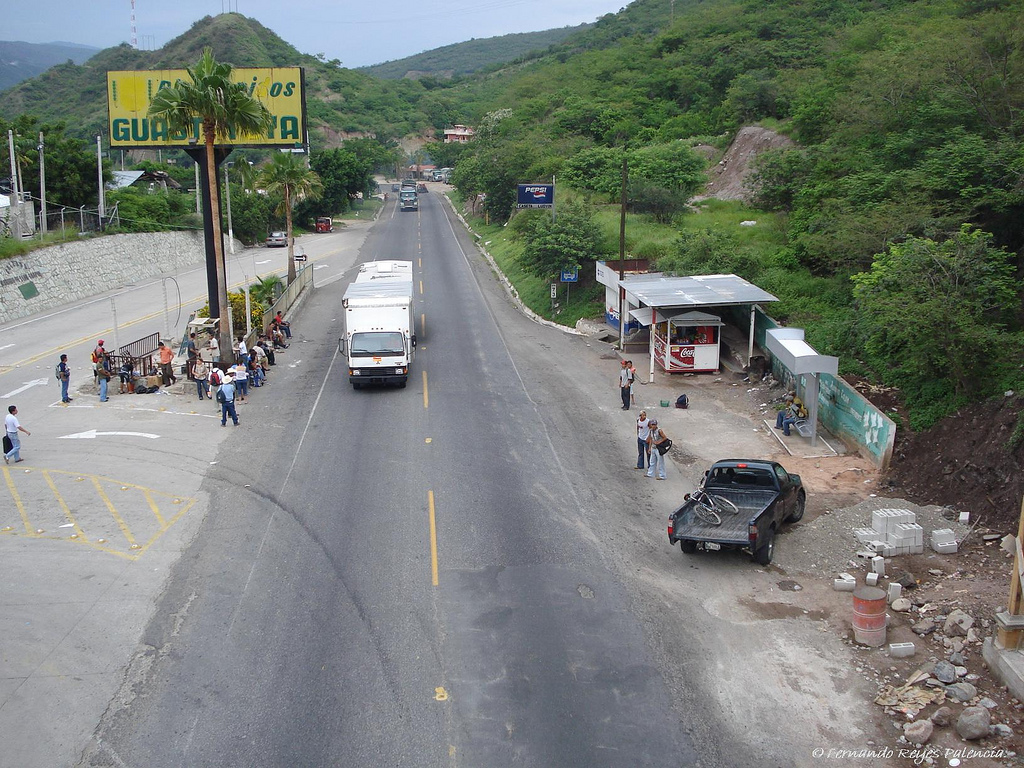
The entrance to Guastatoya

El Progreso is divided into eight municipalities:

1. El Jícaro
2. Guastatoya
3. Morazán
4. San Agustín Acasaguastlán
5. San Antonio La Paz
6. San Cristóbal Acasaguastlán
7. Sanarate
8. Sansare
