= San Agustín Acasaguastlán =

- Municipality
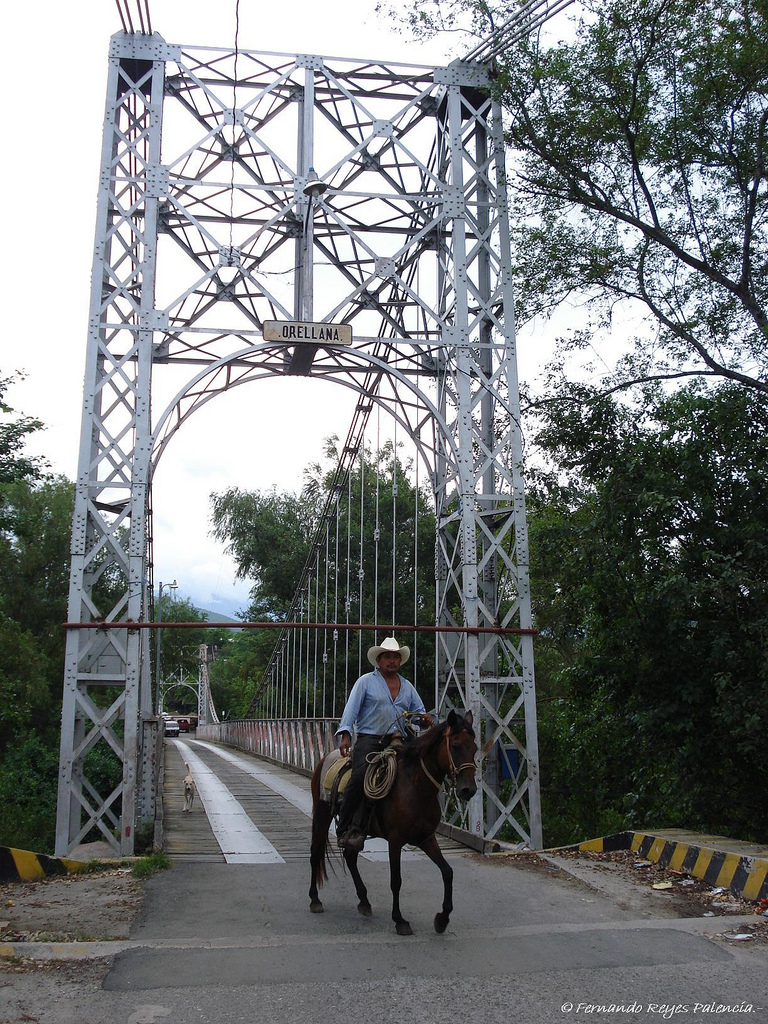
- Puente Orellana

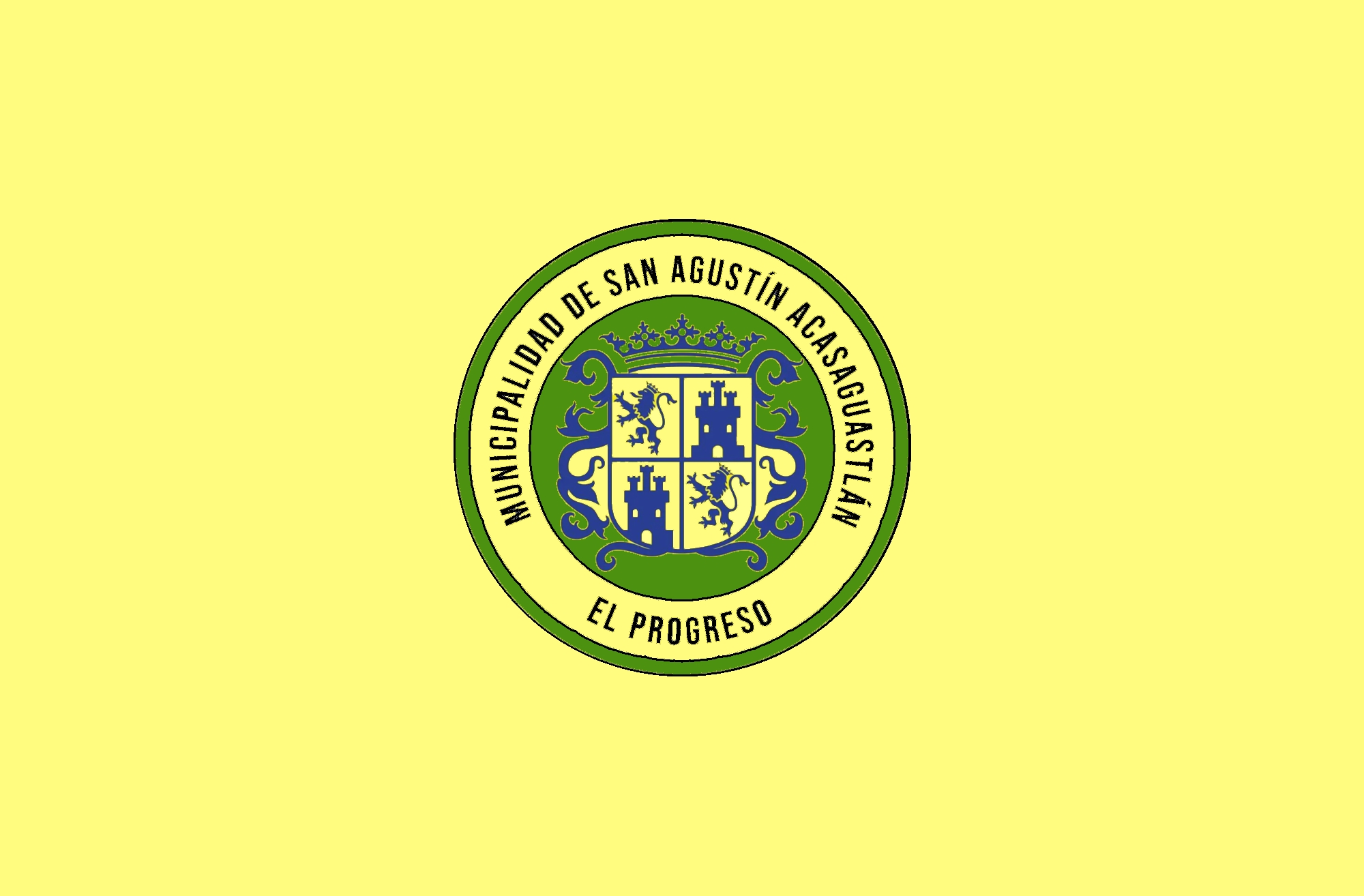
- Flag

- Location in Guatemala
- Coordinates: 14°57′00″N 89°58′00″W
- Country: Guatemala
- Department: El Progreso

Government
  - Mayor: José Manuel Marroquín (GANA)

Area
  - Total: 358 km^{2} (138 sq mi)

Population (2018 census)
  - Total: 45,765
  - Density: 128/km^{2} (331/sq mi)
- Climate: BSh

San Agustín Acasaguastlán (Spanish pronunciation: [san aɣusˈtin akasaɣwasˈtlan]) is a town and a municipality in the El Progreso department of Guatemala. At the 2018 census, the population of the town was 17,728 and that of the municipality 45,765. The aldea (hamlet) Tulumaje is in this municipality.
