= Zacapa Department =

Department of Guatemala

Coordinates: 14°58′21″N 89°31′42″W

Zacapa Department Departmento de Zacapa
- Department of Guatemala
- Flag Coat of arms

- Country: Guatemala
- Established: 10 November 1871
- Capital: Zacapa
- Municipalities: 10

Government
  - Type: Departmental

Area
  - Department of Guatemala: 2,690 km^{2} (1,040 sq mi)

Population (2018)
  - Department of Guatemala: 245,374
  - Density: 91.2/km^{2} (236/sq mi)
  - Urban: 108,485
  - Religions: Roman Catholicism Evangelicalism Maya
- Time zone: UTC-6

Zacapa (Spanish pronunciation: [saˈkapa]) is one of the 22 departments of Guatemala. It lies in eastern Guatemala with its capital in the city of Zacapa, approximately 112 kilometers (70 miles) from Guatemala City.

== Geography ==
To the north lie the departments of Alta Verapaz and Izabal; to the east is the border with the Republic of Honduras; on the south are Chiquimula and Jalapa and to the west is El Progreso.

The northern half of the department is mountainous, crossed from west to east by the Sierra de las Minas. The southern part of the department has small chains of mountains and isolated hills that are separated by fairly deep ravines. The central part of the department is formed by the riverbed and surroundings of the Motagua River. The river forms a huge valley and depending on the topographic configuration, narrows or widens, giving rise to very fertile valleys and large plains. This is a benefit to the department and helps in the harvest of products such as sugar cane, tomatoes, good quality tobacco, and other plants.

== Etymology ==
Historian and poet, Capitán Don Francisco Antonio De Fuentes y Guzmán noted that the name "Zacapa" derived from Nahuatl zacatl meaning grass or weed, and apan meaning in the river, a word which in turn is from atl meaning water. Zacapa means on the river of grass.

== History ==
Zacapa department was created on 10 November 1871, as a much larger department. Since then, portions have become other departments, such as the creation of part of El Progreso Department from western Zacapa in 1908.

== Population ==
The population for the whole department of Zacapa is 245,374 (2018 census).

== Climate ==
The climate as in almost the whole region of Zacapa, excluding inhabited highlands, is semi-arid chaparral. This is due to the shadow effect the Sierra de las Minas has over the following land to the south. The average maximum average temperature oscillates between 30° and 40 °C throughout the whole year, with highs of 45 °C reached during the "Semana Santa" (Holy Week) and Summer (March, April, May), though there have been instances where the maximum capped at 25 °C for the day. The minimum might go from some 15 °C in cases of "extreme" conditions over some cold spell north winds, to 25 °C. The previous almost never happens, the latter is considered hot, and the usual hovers around 20 °C. There is a pronounced dry season, often marked by more than two months without rain, which worsens the air quality of the region tremendously. The region's flat areas are known for their loud insects, called chicharras, which chirp in the fields and along the roads during the dry season.

== Economy ==
Zacapa is mainly a rural area that contains a large amount of flat land used mostly to grow cantaloupe, tobacco and roma tomatoes. Bordering the Zacapa valley is the Sierra de las Minas, which harbors fine hardwood forests, and contains marble mines and coffee plantations. Some of the world's finest jade is also found in this area.

== Municipalities ==
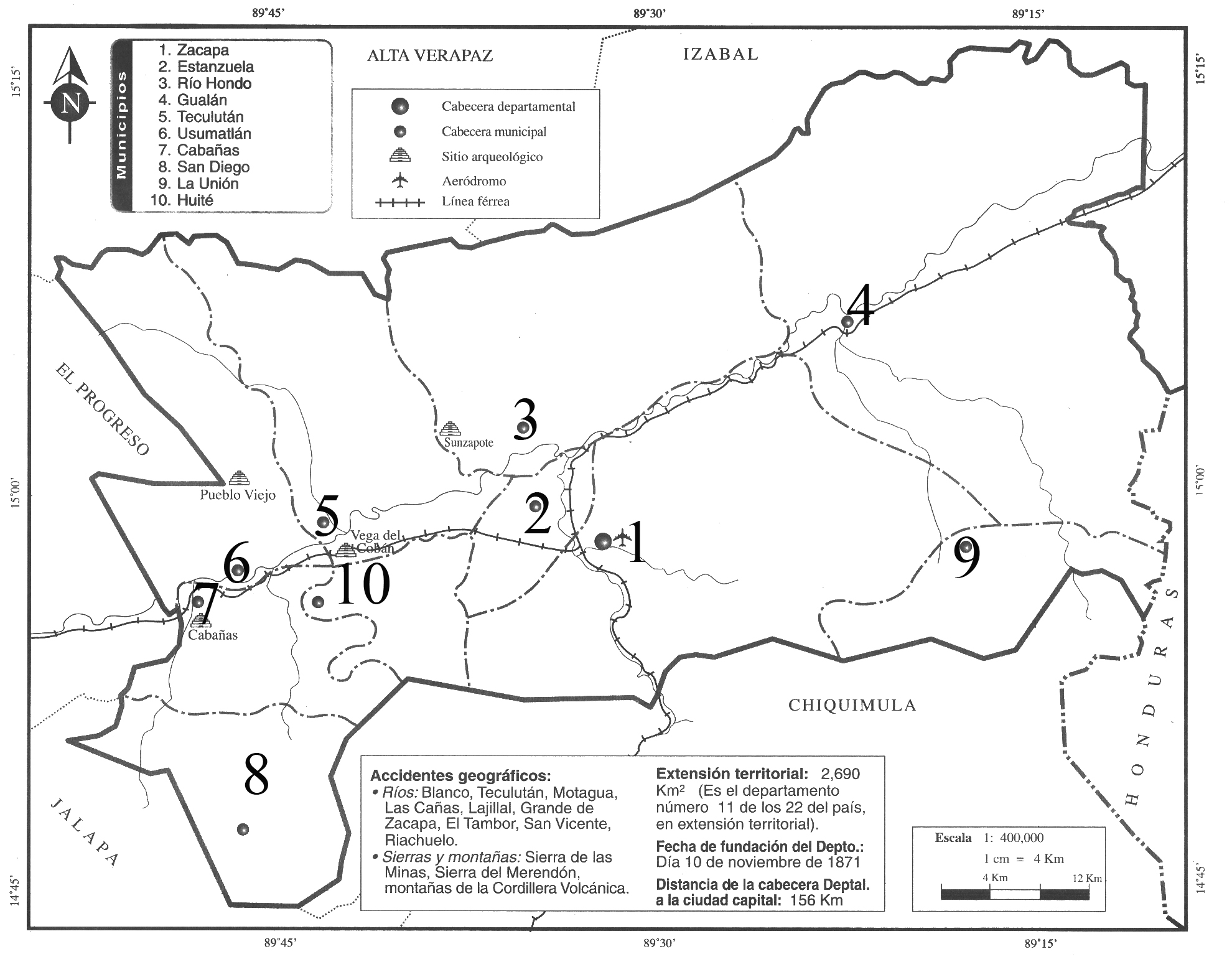
Map of the Municipalities

1. Cabañas
2. Estanzuela
3. Gualán
4. Huité
5. La Unión
6. Río Hondo
7. San Diego
8. San Jorge
9. Teculután
10. Usumatlán
11. Zacapa
