= Zacapa =

- Municipality
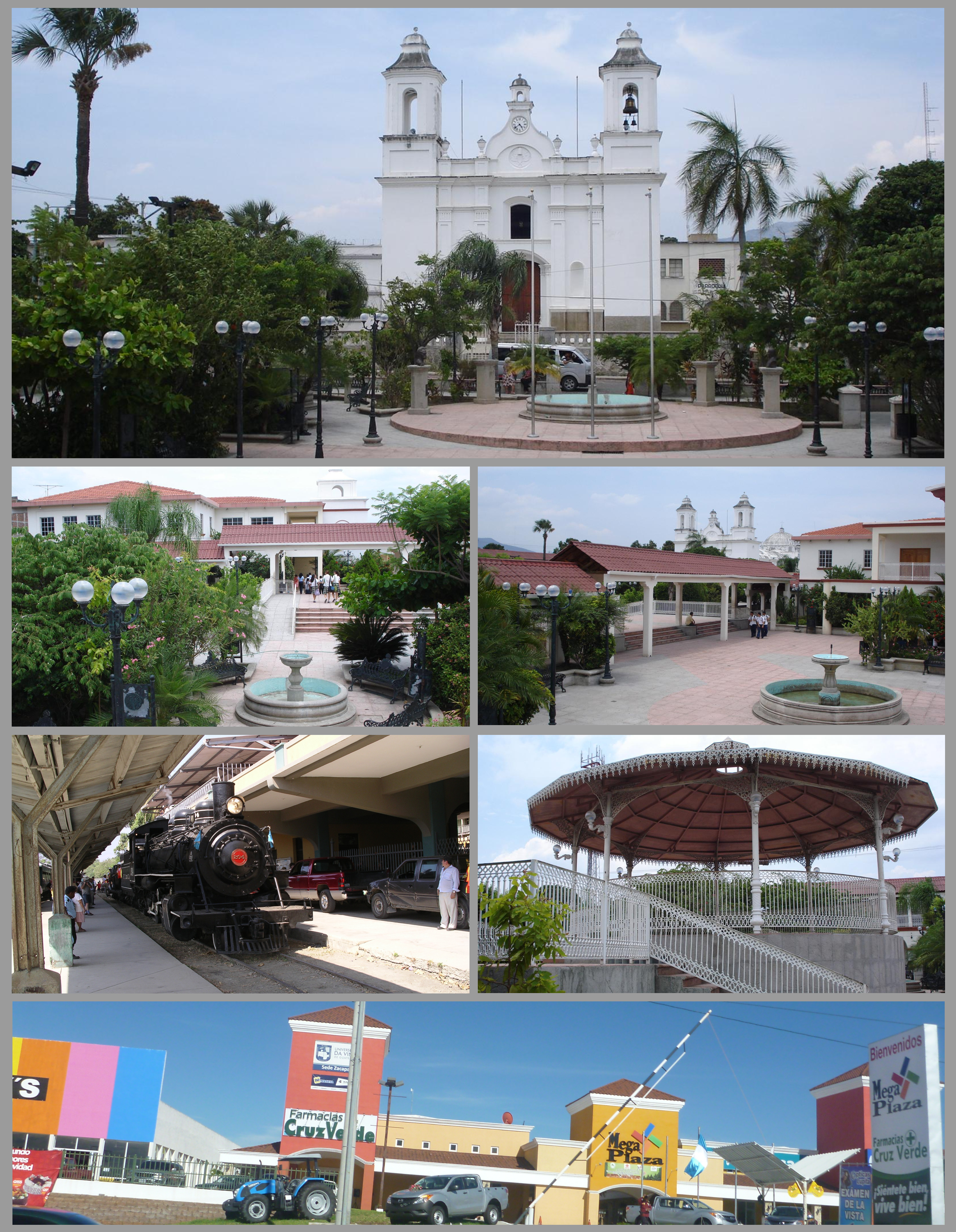

- Seal

- Location in Guatemala
- Coordinates: 14°58′N 89°32′W
- Country: Guatemala
- Department: Zacapa
- Municipality: Zacapa

Government
  - Type: Municipal
  - Mayor: Xiomara Ovalle de Cifuentes

Area
  - Municipality: 397 km^{2} (153 sq mi)
- Elevation: 120 m (390 ft)

Population (Census 2018)
  - Municipality: 60,424
  - Density: 152/km^{2} (390/sq mi)
  - Urban: 60,370
  - Ethnicities: Ladinos
  - Religions: Catholicism; Evangelicalism
- Climate: BSh

Zacapa (Spanish pronunciation: [saˈkapa]) is the departmental capital municipality of Zacapa Department, one of the 22 Departments of Guatemala. It is located approximately 112 kilometres (70 mi) from Guatemala City.

== Sports ==
Football club Deportivo Zacapa competes in Guatemala's top division and play their home games at the Estadio David Ordoñez Bardales. Their team mascot is the Gallo (rooster).

== Etymology ==
Historian and poet, Capitán Don Francisco Antonio De Fuentes Y Guzmán notes in his Remembrance Florida, the name Zacapa derives from Nahuatl Zacatl meaning grass or weed, and apan meaning in the river, a word which in turn is composed of atl also meaning water, river, and apan. Zacapa means on the river of grass.

== See also ==
- Zacapa rum, a brand named for this department.
