= Departments of Guatemala =

Political subdivision of Guatemala

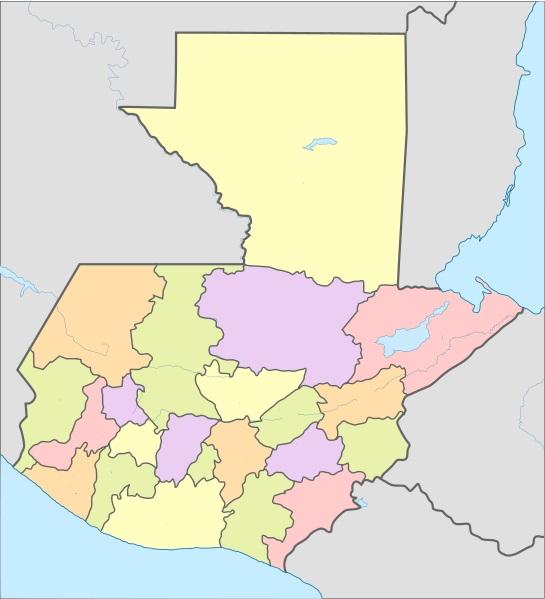
Guatemalan departments (clickable map)

The Republic of Guatemala is divided into 22 departments (Spanish: departamentos) which in turn are divided into 340 municipalities. The departments are governed by a departmental governor, appointed by the President.

In addition, Guatemala has claimed that all or part of the nation of Belize is a department of Guatemala, and this claim is sometimes reflected in maps of the region. Guatemala formally recognized Belize in 1991, but the border disputes between the two nations have not been resolved.

== Evolution of Guatemala's territorial organization ==
- 19th century - The department surrounding British Honduras is called Verapaz by the British
- 1825 - The first seven departments officially established. Verapaz, Chiquimula, Guatemala/Escuintla, Sacatepéquez/Chimaltenango, Soconusco, Totonicapán/Huehuetenango, and Suchitepéquez/Sololá.
- 1838-02-02 - Suchitepéquez/Sololá, Totonicapán/Huehuetenango break away as the Republic of Los Altos
- 1839 - Los Altos reincorporated
- 1845-09-16 - Quetzaltenango department established by decree.
- 1866-05-08 - Huehuetenango, Petén and San Marcos departments established.
- 1871-11-10 - Chiquimula department reduced by establishment of the Zacapa department and a part of the Izabal department.
- 1872-08-12 - Quiché department created from
- 1908-04-13 - Part of El Progreso department created from western Zacapa.
- 1919-12 - El Progreso department renamed to Estrada Cabrera.
- 1920-06-09 - Estrada Cabrera department dissolved.
- 1934 - El Progreso department reestablished.

== List of departments ==
Departments of Guatemala
Flag	Coat	Department	Capital	Largest city	Pop. (2018)	Area (km^{2})	Munici- palities	ISO	Map
		Alta Verapaz	Cobán	San Pedro Carchá	1,215,038	8,686	17	GT-16	
		Baja Verapaz	Salamá		299,476	3,124	8	GT-15	
		Chimaltenango	Chimaltenango		615,776	1,979	16	GT-04	
		Chiquimula	Chiquimula		415,063	2,376	11	GT-20	
		El Progreso	Guastatoya	San Agustín Acasaguastlán	176,632	1,922	8	GT-02	
		Escuintla	Escuintla		733,181	4,384	13	GT-05	
		Guatemala	Guatemala City		3,015,081	2,126	17	GT-01	
		Huehuetenango	Huehuetenango		1,170,669	7,403	31	GT-13	
		Izabal	Puerto Barrios		408,688	9,038	5	GT-18	
		Jalapa	Jalapa		342,923	2,063	7	GT-21	
		Jutiapa	Jutiapa		488,395	3,219	17	GT-22	
		Petén	Flores	Sayaxché	545,600	35,854	12	GT-17	
		Quetzaltenango	Quetzaltenango		799,101	1,951	24	GT-09	
		Quiché	Santa Cruz del Quiché	Chichicastenango	949,261	8,378	21	GT-14	
		Retalhuleu	Retalhuleu		326,828	1,856	9	GT-11	
		Sacatepéquez	Antigua		330,469	465	16	GT-03	
		San Marcos	San Marcos	Malacatán	1,032,277	2,397	29	GT-12	
		Santa Rosa	Cuilapa	Barberena	396,607	2,295	14	GT-06	
		Sololá	Sololá		421,583	1,061	19	GT-07	
		Suchitepéquez	Mazatenango		554,695	2,510	20	GT-10	
		Totonicapán	Totonicapán	Momostenango	418,569	1,061	8	GT-08	
		Zacapa	Zacapa		245,374	2,690	10	GT-19	
		–	–		14,901,286	106,838	332	GT	–
National capital

== See also ==
- List of cities in Guatemala
- List of regions of Guatemala by HDI
