= List of hydroelectric power stations in Guatemala =

This is a list of hydroelectric power stations in Guatemala: The list is incomplete. The Guatemalan Electricity regulating Authority CNEE also has a listing on their website.

Name	River	Municipality	Department	Coordinates	Capacity (MW)	Generation annual (GWh)	Start year	Costs*
Chixoy	Chixoy River	San Cristóbal	Alta Verapaz	15°16′53″N 90°29′27″W	300.00	1245.50	1983	944
Xacbal	Xalbal River	Chajul	Quiché	15°37′22″N 91°05′04″W	94.00	486.00	2010	250
Aguacapa	Aguacapa River	Guanagazapa	Escuintla	14°17′29″N 90°30′18″W	90.00	264.00	1981	
Jurún Marinalá	Michatoya River	Finca el Salto	Escuintla	14°23′21″N 90°42′38″W	60.00	185.00	1970	
Las Vacas	Las Vacas River	Chinautla	Guatemala	14°45′40″N 90°30′11″W	45.00	120.00	2002	
Los Esclavos	Los Esclavos River	Cuilapa	Santa Rosa	14°15′12″N 90°16′36″W	14.00	48.68	1966	
Pasabien	Pasabien River	Rio Hondo	Zacapa	15°03′50″N 89°42′40″W	12.80	40.80	2001	
Río Bobos	Bobos River	Morales	Izabal	15°21′52″N 88°43′32″W	10.00	47.03		
Santa María	Samalá River	Zunil	Quetzaltenango	14°48′11″N 91°27′18″W	6.80	38.00	1927	
El Salto	Michatoya River		Escuintla	14°19′56″N 90°45′05″W	5.00	6.50	1939	
Palín II	Michatoya River	Palín	Escuintla	14°19′56″N 90°45′05″W	2.90		2005	
El Porvenir		San Pablo	San Marcos		2.28	16.00	1968	
Chichaic		Cobán	Alta Verapaz		0.70		1979	

*) Building costs in millions of US$
