= Empresas ICA =

Mexican construction company

- Trade name: Empresas ICA, S.A. de C.V.
- Company type: S.A. de C.V
- Traded as: BMV: ICA; NYSE: ICA
- Industry: Civil construction, Industrial construction, Concession (contract), and Airports
- Founded: 1947; 79 years ago
- Founder: Bernardo Quintana Arrioja
- Headquarters: Mexico City, Mexico
- Area served: Latin America
- Key people: Bernardo Quintana Isaac (Chairman); Guadalupe Phillips Margain (CEO)
- Website: ica.com.mx

Empresas ICA is a construction company that was founded on 4 July 1947, by Mexican civil engineer Bernardo Quintana Arrioja. The company has built multiple landmarks, buildings, and facilities in Mexico, including the Estadio Azteca, the modern Basilica of Our Lady of Guadalupe and Infiernillo Dam, and internationally, Aguacapa Dam, in Guatemala.

== History ==
ICA was formed and founded after 17 engineers quit their previous jobs. They received their first contract, which was to create the Miguel Alemán Multifamily Urban Center. In 1953, ICA founded two subsidiary companies: Estructuras y Cimentaciones (ECSA) and Conducciones y Pavimentos (IASA), which were made to split the workload of the company. During the 1960s, ICA began to undertake larger infrastructure projects, including the Infiernillo Dam, the Mexico City Metro, and the Estadio Azteca. In 1992, they joined the Mexican Stock Exchange and the New York Stock Exchange.

== List of notable projects ==
- Estadio Olímpico Universitario (1952)
- Ciudad Satélite, Naucalpan (1955)
- Belisiario Domínguez Bridge, above the Sumidero Canyon (1956)
- Ferrocarril Chihuahua al Pacífico (1961)
- Estadio Azteca, built for the 1970 FIFA World Cup (1962)
- Infiernillo Dam (1965)
- Palacio de los Deportes (1968)
- Mexico City Metro (1969)
- The modern Basilica of Our Lady of Guadalupe (1976)
- Aguacapa Dam, in Guatemala (1981)
- Legislative Palace of San Lázaro (1981)
- Torre Ejecutiva Pemex (1984)
- Laguna Verde Nuclear Power Station (1990)
- Papalote Museo del Niño (1993)
- Torre Mayor (2003)
- Mexico City International Airport Terminal 2 (2007)
- Estadio Omnilife (2010)
- Emisor Oriente Tunnel (2014)
- Maya Train (2023)
