= Las Vacas Dam =

Dam in Chinautla, Guatemala

- Official name: Planta Hidroeléctrica Río Las Vacas (HRLV)
- Location: Chinautla (Guatemala)
- Coordinates: 14°45′40″N 90°30′11″W
- Construction began: 1998
- Opening date: May 2002; May 2003 - second fase
- Operators: Hidroelectrica Rio Las Vacas, S.A

Dam and spillways
- Impounds: Las Vacas River
- Height: 17 m
- Length: 136 m

Reservoir
- Total capacity: 258,969 m³

The Las Vacas Dam (Spanish: Planta Hidroeléctrica Río Las Vacas) is a reinforced concrete gravity dam and power plant spanning the Las Vacas River near the village of San Antonio Las Flores in the municipality Chinautla, Guatemala.

The hydroelectric power plant is designed as a peaking plant and the water stored in its 258,969 m³ reservoir is used to generate electricity during hours of peak demand. It has 5 Pelton turbines with a total installed capacity of 45 MWe which generate an average of 120 GWh of electricity per year.

The plant includes facilities for collecting and recycling plastic waste material found in the reservoir.

The Las Vacas project was built by a conglomerate of 4 private sector companies: Cementos Progreso, Fabrigas, Comegsa, and Iberdrola, which are partners in Hidroeléctrica Río Las Vacas, S.A.

== History ==
In January 2003, the operators of the dam were found to be responsible for a major industrial waste spill into the Las Vacas River, which subsequently also polluted the Motagua River, leading to the temporary closure of the hydroelectric power station.

== See also ==
- List of hydroelectric power stations in Guatemala
- Hydroelectricity
