= Bernardo Quintana Arrioja =

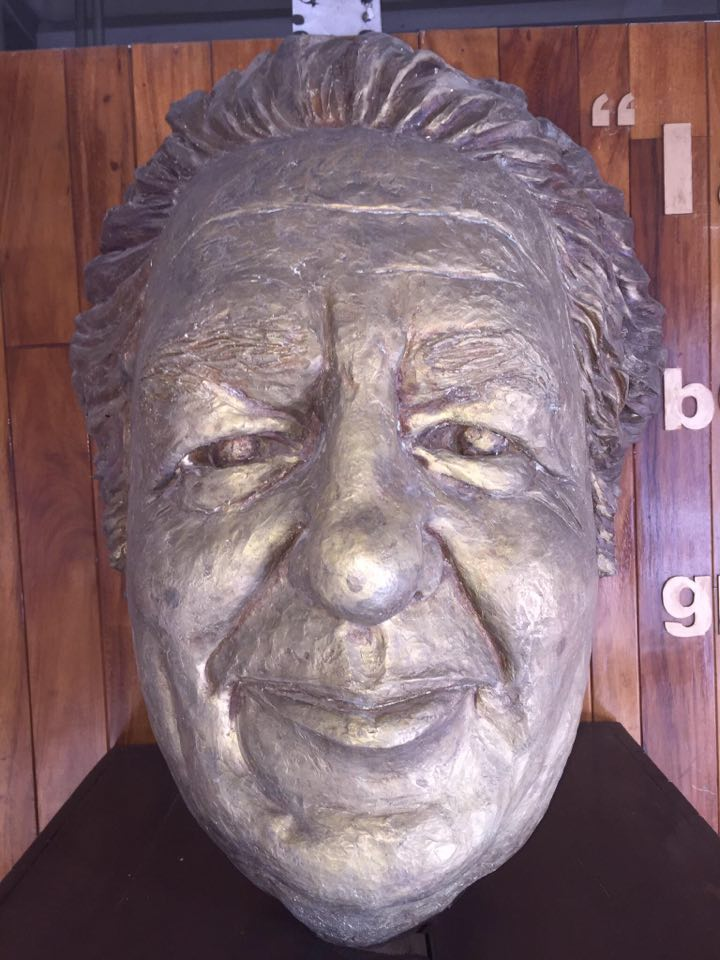
- Bust of Bernardo Quintana in the campus of Conalep Ing. Bernardo Quintana Arrioja
- Born: Bernardo Quintana Arrioja; 29 October 1919; Mexico City
- Died: 12 August 1984 (aged 64); Mexico City
- Engineering career
- Projects: Estadio Azteca, Mexico City Airport

Bernardo Quintana Arrioja (29 October 1919, in Mexico City – 12 August 1984) was a Mexican civil engineer who contributed to his country's infrastructure during the second part of the twentieth century. Bernardo Quintana studied civil engineering at the National Autonomous University of Mexico (UNAM) and made important contributions to engineering by developing, adopting and spreading innovative technologies in the construction of large civil projects. He contributed a generation infrastructure projects in a number of areas of Mexico.

In 1947, he founded Ingenieros Civiles Asociados (ICA) ("Associated Civil Engineers"), an engineering firm for high technology projects that grew to be a "massive construction multinational", building much of the infrastructure of modern Mexico. These projects included the Mexico City Metro, the 100-km tunnel to drain the sewage from Mexico City, Basilica of Our Lady of Guadalupe, stadiums such as Estadio Azteca, Palacio de los Deportes, Foro Sol, and other sport stadiums such as Hipódromo de las Américas, C.U Stadium and the Olympic Pool. Some of the Airports ICA constructed are the Mexico City International Airport, the Acapulco International Airport in Acapulco and the Cancún International Airport. Malls he constructed are: Perisur, Plaza Satélite, Bosques de las Lomas. Other contributions include highways such as: Mexico City-Acapulco, Mexico City-Veracruz, Cuernavaca – Acapulco and the modernization of the highway from Mexico City to Querétaro. In Mexico City constructed Periferico road among others. Hospitals: Centro Medico La Raza, Hospital de Pemex and Centro Medico Nacional ABC also known as Hospital Ingles. Energy-related projects include the Thermoelectric Head offices in Laguna Verde. He remained as head of ICA until his death in 1984 and is interred at the Rotunda of Illustrious Persons.

== Childhood and education ==
He studied in the Colegio Franco Inglés and in the Escuela Nacional Preparatoria. Quintana belonged to the first post-revolutionary generation. This post-revolutionary generation was a time of instability and major changes that changed the third decade of the twentieth century in Mexico. In many ways, Mexico twenties years accounted for the final dissolution of the current practices during the Porfirio Díaz government and step towards the consolidation of a political system which lead to a new era of construction along the countryand Bernardo adopted a philosophy of commitment to service "I will do for my country, be for my country and to grow for my country. In school, he was active in the Wachachara football team and social club.

In 1938, at age 18, he began his studies at the National School of Engineers in UNAM and completed in 1942. The following year he published his professional thesis. He married Martha Rosa Isaac Ahumada when he was 21. Their eldest child, Bernardo, is the current director firm his father founded. Other children are: Marta, Maria Isabel, Claudia, Cecilia and Luis. In this way he was ready to proceed to the qualification. In 1943 Bernardo Quintana decided to launch another career, now studying architecture to complete the engineering. He supported various academic, cultural and sports activities in this university, as the Symphony Orchestra of the Palace the Mineria, the Pumas football club and built schools of Engineering, Architecture, Commerce, Veterinary Medicine, Dentistry and philosophy, as well as laboratories Chemical Engineering and Sciences Tower.

== ICA ==
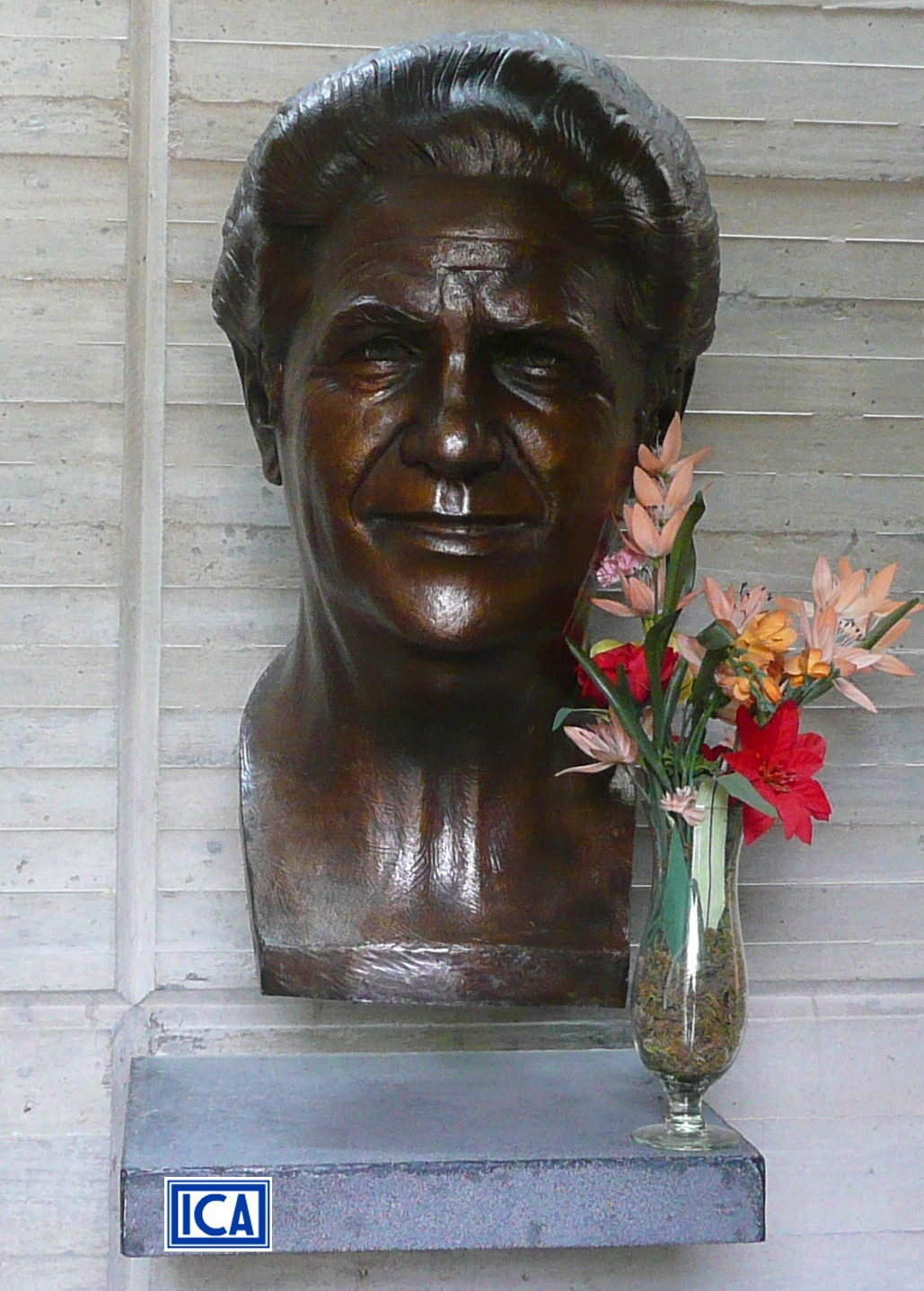
Bust of Engineer Bernardo Quintana on his grave at the Rotonda de las Personas Ilustres, Panteón de Dolores, Mexico City, Mexico

Quintana founded the Ingenieros Civiles Asociados or ICA in 1947 which has managed engineering and construction works in 21 countries. In 1970, ICA became international and started building in Central and South America. By 1976, the ICA Group had more than 2 000 shareholders and 70 000 employees, both in Mexico and abroad. In 1991 Bernardo Quintana as the executive director of ICA, helped and completed the acquisition of Cementos Tolteca which was from the British company Blue Circle. ICA has worked in several countries in Latin America since the seventies, and in 1988, this company entered the U.S. market. Recently, it began work in Europe and Asia.

ICA is divided by four main business units: civil construction, industrial construction, infrastructure operations and housing. Civil construction realizes basic infrastructure projects and large-scale development of urban infrastructure. Industrial construction provides engineering, construction and industrial plants maintenance.

Infrastructure operation and maintains road systems, water distribution, wastewater treatment, airports, underground parking, housing, marketing real estate developments of the highest quality, both commercial and residential parks centers and office buildings in different cities. Up to now, ICA has participated in more than 180 highway projects, 61 dams, 38 hospitals, 24 power plants, 19 stadiums and sports centers, and 10 housing projects completed along with other 24 projects under implementation, obtaining a total of 40,000 homes. ICA has partnered with leading companies in the world to initiate and develop new projects.

ICA foundation supports the following organizations: Engineering Institute of the UNAM Mexican Center for Philanthropy (CEMEFI) AMABPAC Advisory Council on Earthquakes (CoCoS) College of Civil Engineers of Mexico (Colegio de Ingenieros Civiles de México)

== Major projects under Quintana ==
=== Mexico City Metro ===
The Mexico City Metro is a large network of trains that travel through the city at a medium/high speed and transports nearly 3.9 million passengers daily. The idea of a subway system started with the students of the UNAM (Universidad Nacional Autónoma de México) in 1958. The initial project concerned the construction of a monorail that would transport students that lived far away from the university easily and for a low price. Bernardo Quintana realized a project to build a subway in Mexico City. First his draft was submitted to various authorities, he wouldn't get any support. The government wouldn't help because it was a very expensive project. A project proposal was submitted in 1958 to Ernesto P. Uruchurtu, Regent of Mexico City from 1952 to 1966, who rejected it because of its cost. In addition, on 28 July 1957, an earthquake of 7 degrees on the Richter scale damaged several buildings of downtown, which caused the mistrust of the authorities to build big projects like this. Quintana resubmitted its project in the presidency of Gustavo Díaz Ordaz, President of Mexico from 1964 to 1970. Then, with economic help from the French government. In 1967 the Mexican government announced the acceptance about new project of transportation. Two months later, was performed the opening ceremony of the works at the intersection of Avenida Chapultepec and Avenida Bucareli. Bernardo's company started the construction of the subway system that would travel all over the city.

That was the start of construction of the subway in Mexico City by ICA and made the first trip occurred 4 September 1969 between the stations that are Insurgentes and Metro Zaragosa. Now the subway has 11 lines and 164 stations and is the cheapest subway in the world. It has been also recognized for its cleanliness and is the first subway to start working with colors and icons for each station.

=== Ciudad Universitaria ===
The main campus of the university is called Ciudad Universitaria. Ciudad Universitaria has a big stadium that was used to host the Olympic games once. Ciudad universitaria was built by Bernardo Quintana's company and it was a huge project that took many years to finish. Quintana's main constructions in this university are the sections of: engineering; architecture, trade, veterinary, dentistry, philosophy, chemistry engineering lab, science tower and the university stadium.

Now the university is considered as one of the most important universities in the world.

=== Estadio Azteca ===
The Estadio Azteca is the third largest stadium in the world and has been used to host the football world cup twice. It is one of the world's most important stadiums. It is worldwide recognized to have a lot of technology in its construction and to have a huge capacity. Is draining system is one of the most advanced and it helps to avoid floods inside the stadium. The parking lot is very big and is very near from the stadium as well. It is by now the place where Mexico's team plays against other countries and it is also the place where the Aguilas form the America play.

It was built in 1962 to host the World Cup in 1970. This work took over four years for ICA company. The approximate weight of concrete used to build the stadium is 100,000 tons.

=== Other construction ===
Through ICA, Quintana was responsible for building several of Mexico's major malls such as Plaza Satellite, Perisur, and Bosque de las Lomas. Plaza Satellite is a construction of a commercial set and a parking for 4,000 cars. The construction was in an area of 160,000 m^{2}, the most representative volumes are of 45,000 m^{3} of concrete, 4,500 tons of reinforced steel and 850 tons of structural steel with 12 interior squares, In the principal square there is raised a sculpture 16 m high. Perisur is one of the most important malls in Mexico City. The Executed quantity 176,900 m^{2}. It shelters 150 business premises, 2 parkings: 1 cutlery in 2 levels with capacity for 3,200 cars and other one outdoors that gives quota to 2,400 cars. Today, Perisur is one of the malls that have grown rapidly.

Construction of the new Basilica of Our Lady of Guadalupe with capacity for 10,000 parishioners and parking for 900 cars 14,500 m2 in two levels in the porch of the basilica and other one deprived for 280 cars with 5,000 m^{2} of construction in the north zone of the porch in two levels. In addition, three works 200,000 were excavated m3, 60,000 were placed m3 of concrete, 7,000 tons of steel of reinforcement, and 180,000 m^{2} of centering. The basilica occupies an area of 10,000 m^{2}. Other constructions for the city in terms of infrastructure are Periferico, a road that circles the city. Other important roads are Emisor Poniente, Eje Central and Universidad.

== Recognitions ==
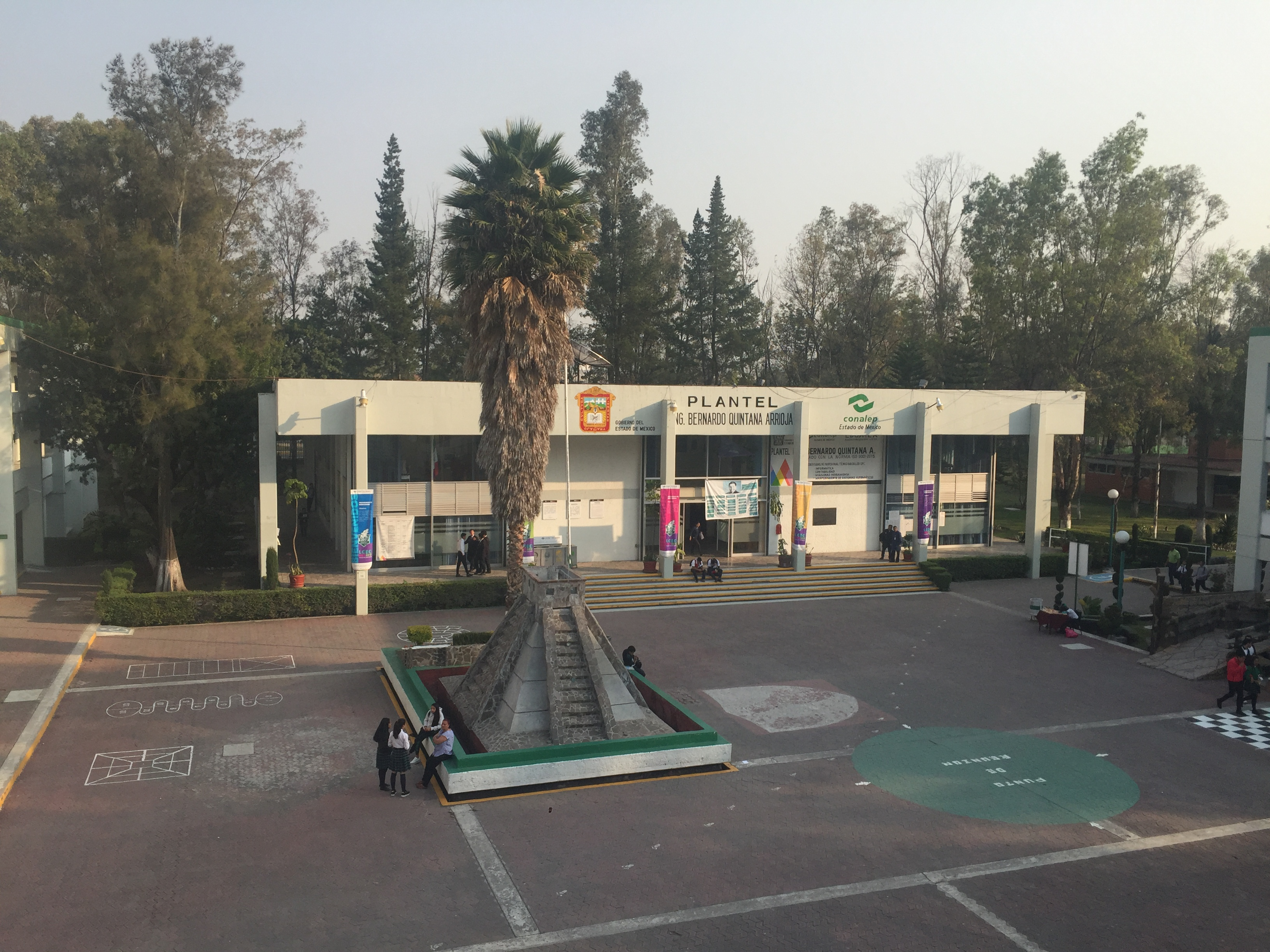
The Conalep Ing. Bernardo Quintana Arrioja, a campus of the National College of Professional Technical Education that bears his name for his contributions to the development of the industry and as a tribute in his memory

During his lifetime, Bernardo Quintana Arrioja received numerous awards and honors. In 1964 he was named "The Businessman in 1964," by Sales & Marketing Executives International. In 1968, the government of France declared him "Gentleman of the Legion Honor." In 1970, the Autonoma Universidad of Guadalajara gave him the title of "Honorary Doctorate." Six years later, Bernardo Quintana obtained the National Prize of Engineering. In 1980, the International Road Federation named him "Man of the Year." The government of Sweden named him "Polar Star," and he was given the "Order of the Commander," from the British Government.

After his death in 1984, he received a number of honors in his memory.

Quintana has received various honors, and he is honored by one named after him. Presea "Ing. Bernardo Quintana Arrioja" 2010, which has as object the reward and to recognize publicly the pupils which for his student path and personal merits stood out for the following qualities: leadership, patriotism, service, value and academic excellence.

Bernardo Quintana, died on 12 August 1984 his remains were moved to the Rotonda de los Hombres Ilustres. In 2005, the government of Vicente Fox issued a decree to allow the inclusion of Bernardo Quinta Arrioja into Rotonda of the Illustrious Persons. The cemetery contains those persons who have made important contributions to Mexico. Prominent figures such as David Alfaro Siqueiros, Alfonso Reyes, Francisco Gonzalez Bocanegra, among other. Bernardo Quintana is the only businessman who has been given this honor.

Bernardo Quintana will be honored in the first museum of Mexico that will recognize the most important Businessmen in Mexico. Other businessmen that will be exposed in this museum are: Carlos Slim Helú (Group Carso), Eugenio Garza Sada (FEMSA), Bernardo Quintana Arrioja (ICA), Carlos Gonzalez Nova (Mexican Commercial). It will be composed of photography, movies, interactive presentations of the diverse companies that they developed. This museum will be one of its kind here in Mexico and in Latin America. Its purpose is to promote the business culture among youths.
