= Bobos River =

Bobos River may refer to:

- Bobos River (Guatemala)
- Bobos River (Mexico)

== See also ==
- Bobo River, New South Wales, Australia
