= Jurún Marinalá Dam =

Dam in Finca El Salto, Guatemala

- Location within Guatemala
- Official name: Planta Hidroeléctrica Jurún Marinalá
- Location: Finca El Salto (Escuintla)
- Coordinates: 14°23′21″N 90°42′38″W
- Opening date: 1970

Dam and spillways
- Impounds: Michatoya River

Reservoir
- Total capacity: 112,000 m^{3}

The Jurún Marinalá Dam (Spanish: Planta Hidroeléctrica Jurún Marinalá) is a reinforced concrete gravity dam and power plant spanning the Michatoya River in Escuintla, Guatemala. The project became operational in 1970.

The dam's reservoir has a total capacity of 112,000 m^{3}. The water is transported to the powerhouse through a 4.03 km long tunnel and a 2.44 km long pressure pipe. The plant has 3 × 20 MW Pelton turbines, with a total installed capacity of 60 MW. The plant has a net level declination of 660 m, and a designed flow of 4 m^{/s} per unit.

The plant's total power generation between 1970 and 2006 was 6674.91 GWh, which amounts to a mean annual power generation of 185 GWh.

== See also ==
- List of hydroelectric power stations in Guatemala
