= Aguacapa River =

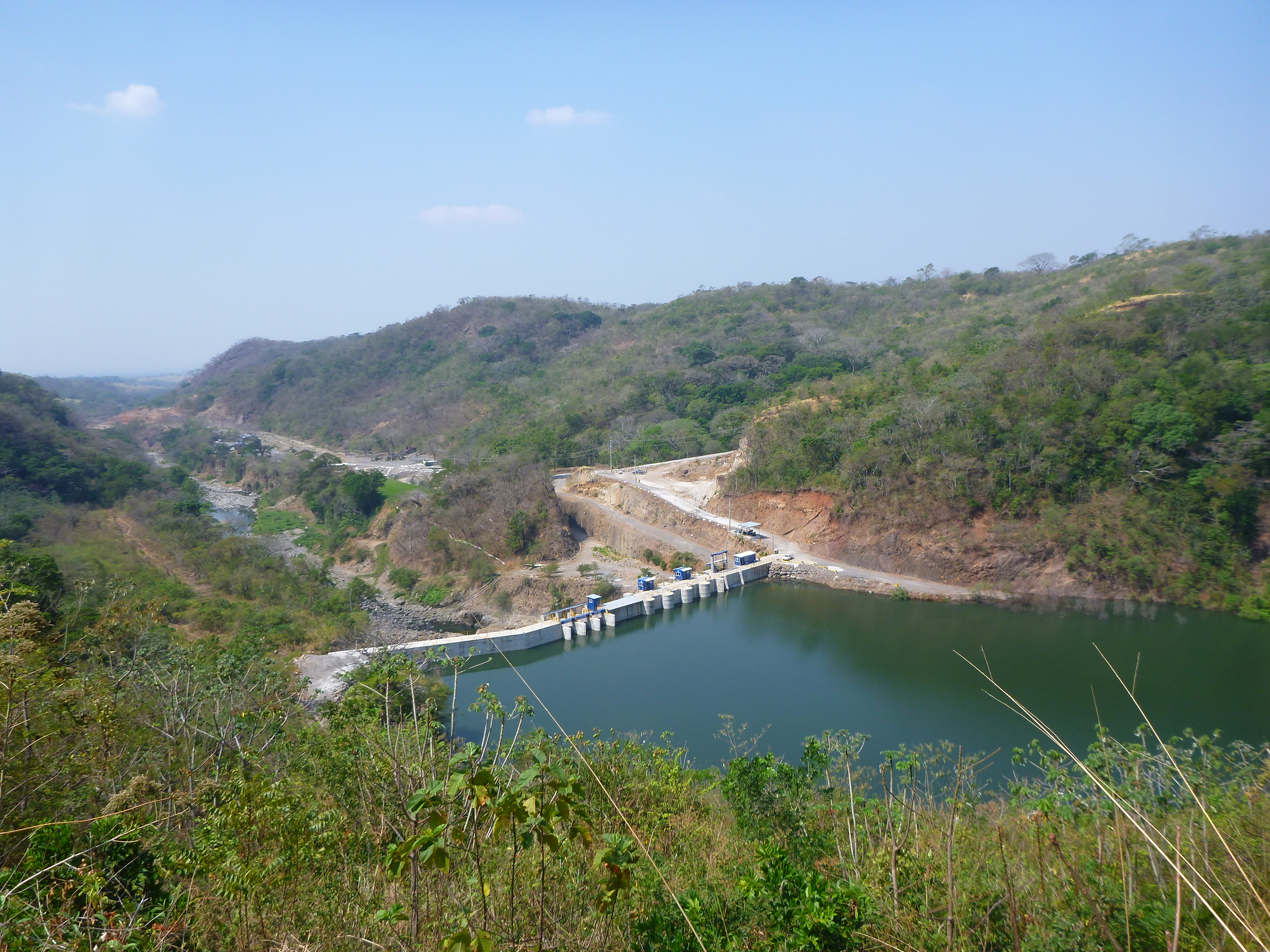
- El Cóbano Hydroelectric Dam

Location
- Country: Guatemala

Physical characteristics
- Source
  - coordinates: 14.5086°N 90.4695°W
  - elevation: 1,850 m (6,070 ft)
- Mouth
  - location: Tributary of the María Linda River
  - coordinates: 14.2797°N 90.5266°W
  - elevation: 580 m (1,900 ft)

The Aguacapa River (Spanish pronunciation: [aɣwaˈkapa]) is a river in Guatemala. Its sources are located in the hills southeast of Guatemala City, at an altitude of 1,850 metres (6,070 ft). From there it flows in a southerly direction through the departments of Guatemala and Santa Rosa and at 14.2797°N 90.5266°W joins the Maria Linda River, which flows into the Pacific Ocean.

The river was dammed in 1981 in order to power the turbines of the Aguacapa Hydroelectric Power Plant. In 2015 a second dam was built for the El Cóbano Hydroelectric Power Plant.

== See also ==
- List of rivers of Guatemala
