= Xacbal Dam =

Dam in Chajul, Guatemala

- Official name: Planta Hidroeléctrica Xacbal
- Location: Chajul (El Quiché)
- Coordinates: 15°37′22″N 91°05′04″W
- Construction began: April 2007
- Opening date: August 2010
- Construction cost: US$ 250 million
- Operators: Hidro Xacbal, S.A.

Dam and spillways
- Impounds: Xacbal River
- Height: 10.35 m

Reservoir
- Total capacity: 700,000 m^{3}

The Xacbal Dam (Spanish: Planta Hidroeléctrica Xacbal) is a reinforced concrete gravity dam and power plant spanning the Xacbal River in the municipality of Chajul, Guatemala. Construction began in April 2007 and the project became operational in August 2010.

A 10.35 m high dam diverts the river's water flow to a sand filter and on through an open conduction channel to a daily regulation reservoir located outside the river channel. A 4.7 km conduction tunnel with a diameter of 4.65 m, directs the water through a 615 m long pressure pipe (diameter 3.55 m) to the power house. The water is diverted back to the Xacbal river channel.

The plant has 2 x 47 MW Francis vertical axis turbines with an installed capacity of 94 MW. A 120 km transmission line was built to connect the power plant to the national grid. Annual power production is estimated at 486 GWh.

== See also ==
- List of hydroelectric power stations in Guatemala
