= Las Vacas River =

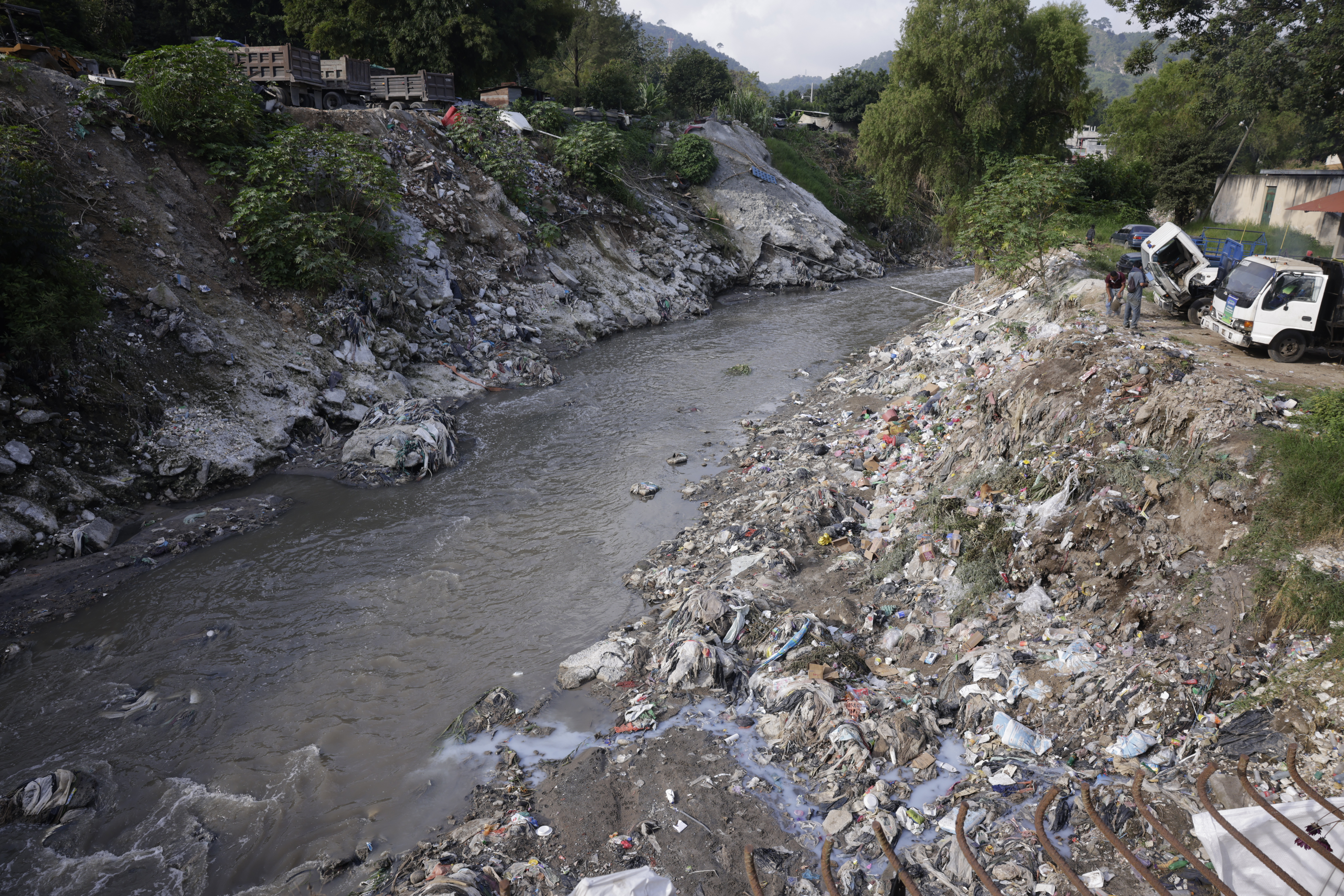

Location
- Country: Guatemala

Physical characteristics
- Source
  - location: Guatemala City
  - coordinates: 14°36′27″N 90°29′44″W
  - elevation: 1,800 m (5,900 ft)
- Mouth
  - location: Tributary of the Motagua River
  - coordinates: 14°52′26″N 90°23′42″W
  - elevation: 400 m (1,300 ft)

The Las Vacas River is a river in Guatemala. It begins in the mountains on the eastern outskirts of Guatemala City and runs in a north-easterly direction to join the Motagua River where the departmental borders of El Progreso, Baja Verapaz and Guatemala converge. In its final kilometres, the river marks the limits between the departments of Guatemala and El Progreso.

The river is a major outlet for Guatemala City's raw sewage. Its highly polluted waters contain little aquatic life, and contribute to the pollution of the Motagua river and the marine ecosystem in the Gulf of Honduras.

The environmental NGO the Ocean Cleanup installed a floating barrier in 2023 to catch trash and prevent it from reaching the Gulf of Honduras and the Caribbean Sea.

The Las Vacas Hydroelectric Dam spans the river about 18 kilometres (11 mi) north-east of Guatemala City in the municipality of Chinautla, near the limits with San Pedro Ayampuc, where it converges with one of its tributaries, the Quezada river.

On February 10, 2025, a bus fell off a bridge over the Las Vacas River, killing at least 55 people, and seriously injuring 9 others.
