= Villalobos River =

Coordinates: 14.5779°N 90.6384°W

Location
- Country: Guatemala

The Villalobos River is a river of Guatemala, in the Guatemala Department. It is a tributary that drains into the Lake Amatitlán and its basin. Making it one of the main sources of pollution towards the Lake.

Villalobos is made up of several micro-basins; The Platanitos, Molino, Pinula, Las Minas, San Lucas and Parrameño rivers converge there. The Villalobos River is formed from the union of the Molino and San Lucas tributary rivers at kilometer 12.5 of the CA-9 route to the Pacific, close to the named bridge complex. It is considered to start from that point to its mouth in Lake Amatitlán.

== See also ==
- List of rivers of Guatemala
