= Los Esclavos Dam =

Dam in Cuilapa, Guatemala

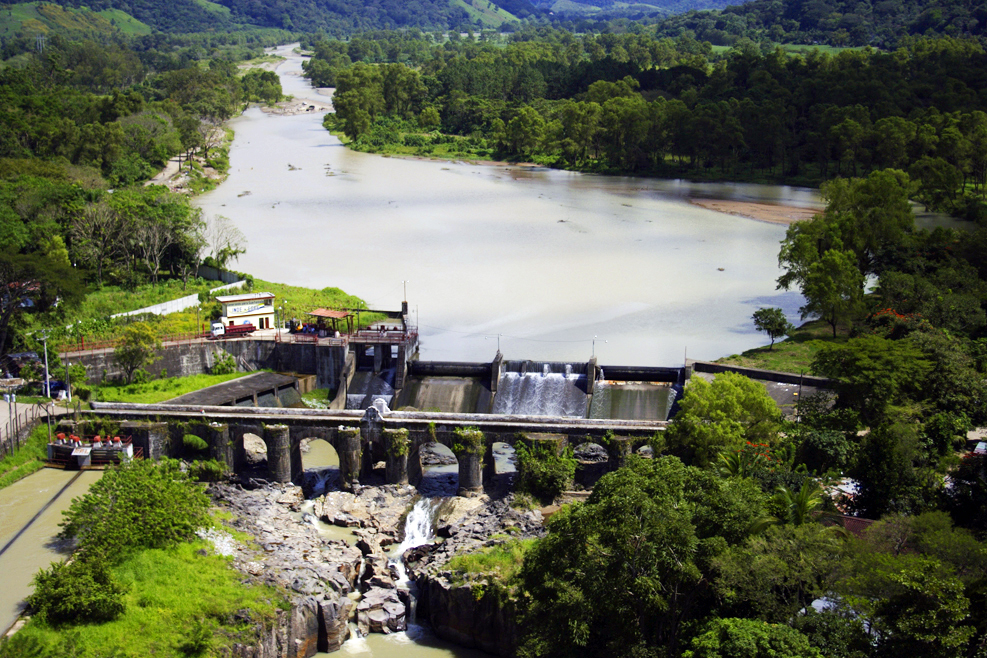

- Location within Guatemala
- Official name: Planta Hidroeléctrica Los Esclavos
- Location: Cuilapa (Santa Rosa)
- Coordinates: 14°15′12″N 90°16′36″W
- Opening date: 1966

Dam and spillways
- Impounds: Los Esclavos River

Reservoir
- Total capacity: 225,000 m^{3}

The Los Esclavos Dam (Spanish: Planta Hidroeléctrica Los Esclavos) is a reinforced concrete gravity dam and power plant spanning the Los Esclavos River in the town of Los Esclavos, in Cuilapa, Santa Rosa, Guatemala. The project became operational in 1966.

== Details ==
The dam's reservoir has a total capacity of 225,000 m^{3}. The water is transported to the powerhouse through a 1.33 km long channel and a 175 m long pressure pipe. The plant has 2 × 7 MW Francis turbines, with a total installed capacity of 14 MW. The plant has a net level declination of 108 m, and a designed flow of 7.68 m^{3}/s per unit.

The plant's total power generation between 1966 and 2006 was 1,947.05 GWh, which amounts to an average annual power generation of 48.68 GWh.

== See also ==
- List of hydroelectric power stations in Guatemala
