= Guatemala–Honduras relations =

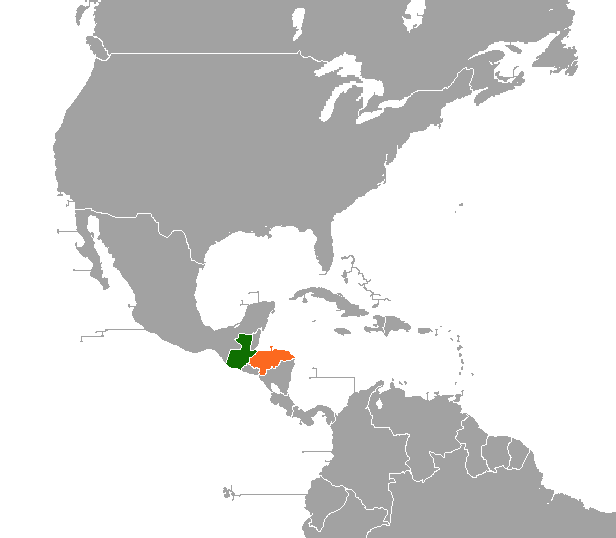

- Guatemala: Honduras

Bilateral relations between Guatemala and Honduras were established in 1821. Guatemala has an embassy in Tegucigalpa and a consulate in San Pedro Sula. Honduras has an embassy in Guatemala City. Both countries are members of the Central American Integration System, Community of Latin American and Caribbean States, Organization of American States, and the Organization of Ibero-American States.

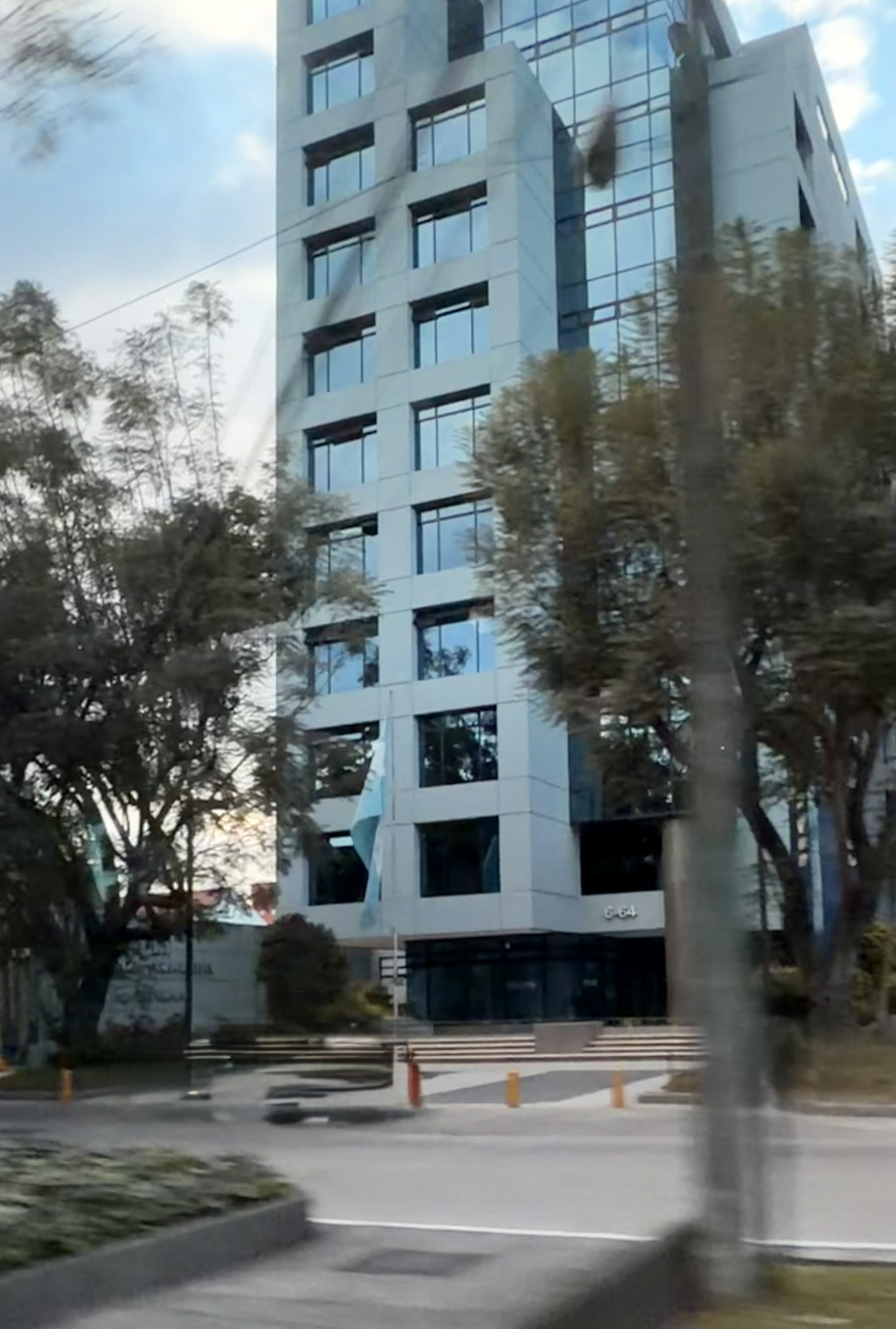
Embassy in Guatemala City

== See also ==
- Guatemala–Honduras border
- Foreign relations of Guatemala
- Foreign relations of Honduras
