= María Linda River =

River in Guatemala

- Location of mouth
- Native name: Río María Linda (Spanish)

Location
- Country: Guatemala

Physical characteristics
- Source
  - location: Guatemala (Guatemala (department))
  - coordinates: 14.334912°N 90.511293°W
  - elevation: 1,600 m (5,200 ft)
- Mouth
  - location: Pacific Ocean
  - coordinates: 13.942148°N 90.708489°W
  - elevation: 0 m (0 ft)
- Length: 70 km (43 mi)
- Discharge
  - average: 13.1 m^{3}/s (460 cu ft/s) (at Guacamayas)

The Río María Linda is a river in southwest Guatemala. Its sources are located south of Lake Amatitlán in the department of Guatemala. The 70 km (43 mi) long river flows southwards through the coastal lowlands of Escuintla and Santa Rosa to the Pacific Ocean.

The María Linda river basin covers a territory of 2,727 square kilometres (1,053 mi^{2}).
