= Chuarrancho =

- Location in Guatemala
- Coordinates: 14°49′05″N 90°30′55″W
- Country: Guatemala
- Department: Guatemala

Area
  - Total: 41 sq mi (105 km^{2})
- Elevation: 4,262 ft (1,299 m)

Population (2002)
  - Total: 10,101
- Climate: Aw

Chuarrancho is a municipality in the Guatemala department of Guatemala. The mayor is Roberto Tocay (UNE).
