= Guatemala–Honduras border =

International border

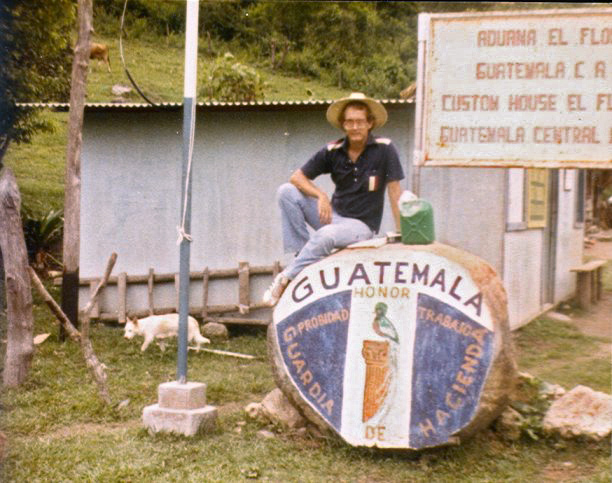
A border post on the Guatemalan side, 1980.

The Guatemala–Honduras adjacency line is a disputed international boundary separating Guatemala on the north and west from Honduras on the south and east. The border dispute and being adjudicated in the ICJ as of 2019.

Its length is 256 km (159 mi). It is the third longest border of Guatemala after the borders that separate that country from Mexico and Belize. For Honduras, it is the shortest border, coming after those with Nicaragua and El Salvador.

The border begins at the mouth of the Motagua River in the Gulf of Honduras, then proceeds upstream. It continues towards the southwest, following several straight lines between geographic landmarks, divides between watersheds, and rivers and streams to its end at the tripoint with El Salvador at the summit of the Montecristo Massif.

== History ==
The border was fixed in 1933 by an arbitration tribunal in the United States after Nicaragua and Guatemala signed an arbitration treaty in 1930. A demarcation commission headed by Sidney H. Birdseye conducted an areal survey and erected 1,028 boundary markers between 1933 and 1936.

== See also ==
- Guatemala–Honduras relations
