= 2025 Escárcega bus crash =

Bus accident in Escárcega, Mexico

Details
- Date: February 8, 2025; 02:00 CT
- Location: Escárcega–Villahermosa highway
- Country: Mexico
- Operator: Tour's Acosta
- Incident type: Traffic collision
- Cause: Under investigation

Statistics
- Vehicles: 2
- Passengers: 48
- Deaths: 41 (including the truck driver)
- Injured: 8

On February 8, 2025, a bus collided with a trailer truck on the Escárcega–Villahermosa highway in Mexico and caught fire. The bus was operated by Tour's Acosta (Note: Described incorrectly by some sources as Tours Acosta.) and was carrying 48 passengers from Cancún to Tabasco. The government of Tabasco reported 41 deaths.

== Crash ==
The passenger bus was traveling from Cancún to Tabasco carrying 48 passengers. It left Cancún at around 19:30 local time on February 7. At around the second hour of February 8, when most passengers were asleep, it collided with a trailer truck and caught fire at km 171 of the Escárcega–Villahermosa highway. Only the metal frame of the vehicle remained. Bus operator Tour's Acosta said that the bus condition was "optimal" and that it maintained a moderate speed consistent with federal rules during the accident. One of the drivers was reportedly overtired. Drivers of both bus and truck died in the crash.

== Aftermath ==
Bystanders tried to free the trapped passengers inside the bus but were unsuccessful. Some survivors escaped by breaking the windows, and suffered burns. Another truck collected the survivors to take them to hospital. Nine survivors initially escaped, seven of whom required hospitalization and were admitted in three hospitals nearby.

The local council, Palacio Municipal de Comalcalco said that they will help in transferring the victims' bodies. Witnesses alleged that the truck traveled in the opposite direction after invading the lane of the bus before the collision. Tour's Acosta announced that the relatives and friends of the passengers had to visit the prosecutor's office of the municipality of Candelaria to perform the necessary procedures. A witness to the crash said that the bystanders were able to rescue around 10 passengers, including a girl with a skull injury and a man with very serious burns. The relatives were told that it may take up to three months to identify all the victims with DNA tests.

=== Investigation ===
As of 9 February 2025, 18 skulls were recovered.

José Ramiro López Obrador, a secretary of government and brother of Andrés Manuel López Obrador, was charged with investigating the crash. The bus company said it is working together with authorities to determine the cause of the crash.

=== Reactions ===
Mayor of Comalcalco, Ovidio Peralta offered his condolences and said that local authorities were sent to the accident site.

Governor of the state of Tabasco, Javier May, offered his condolences on X and said that the state was coordinating with federal and Campeche authorities.

Tabasco state's attorney general office stated that it was coordinating with Campeche authorities and the forensic sciences directorate to carry out genetic tests that facilitate the identification of the victims.

Tour's Acosta offered their condolences and said that it was coordinating with the government for investigation.

== See also ==
- List of traffic collisions (2000–present)
- Transportation in Mexico
- 2021 Mexico bus crash
- 2025 Guatemala City bus crash, another bus accident that occurred in Guatemala two days later
