= Lake Amatitlán =

Crater lake in Guatemala

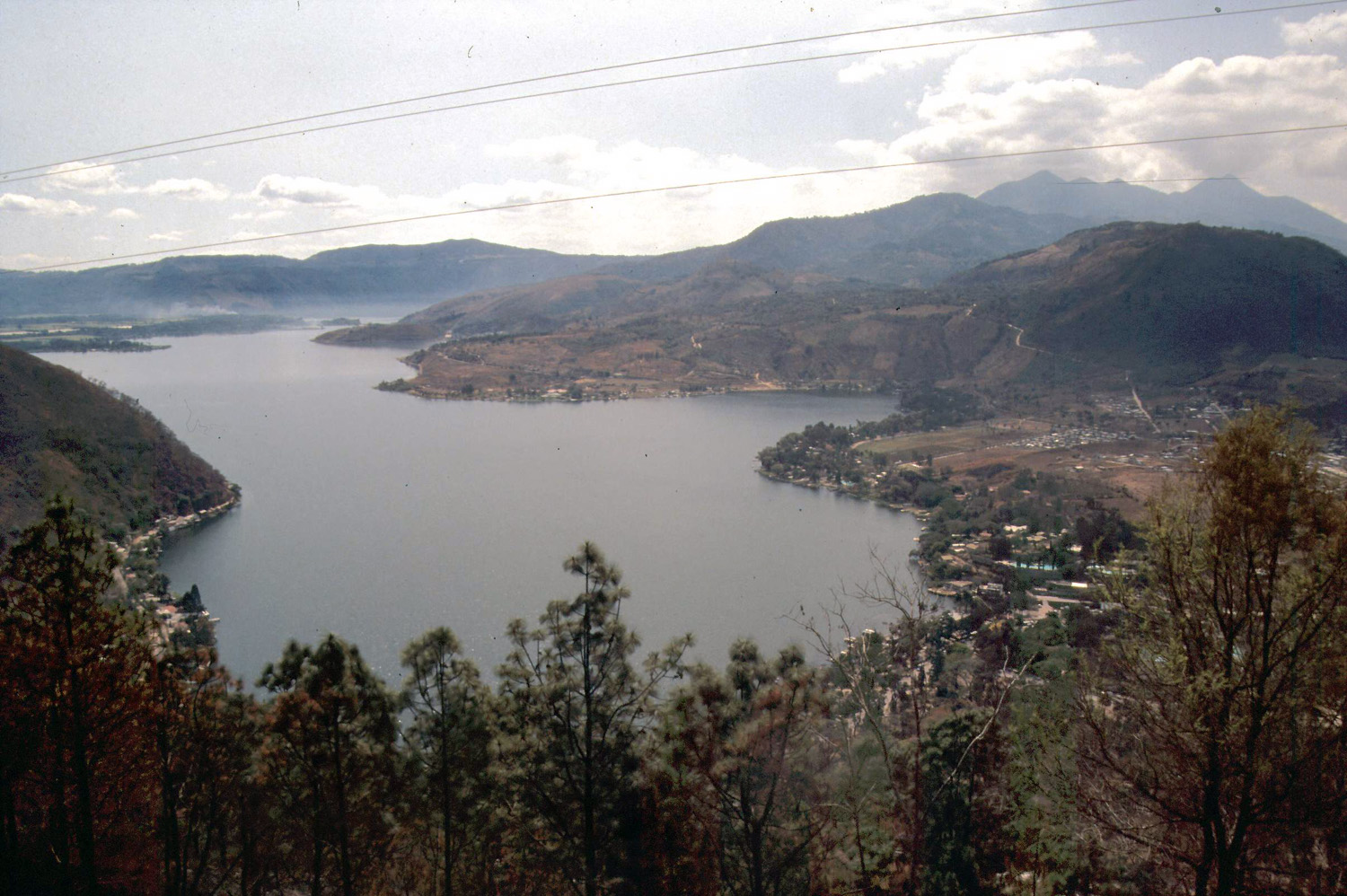
- The lake under Pacaya volcano (in background right)

- Location within Guatemala
- Location: south-central Guatemala
- Coordinates: 14°28′16″N 90°34′54″W
- Primary inflows: Villalobos River
- Primary outflows: Michatoya River
- Catchment area: 368 km^{2} (100 sq mi)
- Basin countries: Guatemala
- Max. length: 11 km (6.8 mi)
- Max. width: 3 km (1.9 mi)
- Surface area: 15.2 km^{2} (5.9 sq mi)
- Max. depth: 33 m (108.3 ft)
- Water volume: 0.286 km^{3} (0.1 cu mi)
- Surface elevation: 1,188 m (3,897.6 ft)
- Frozen: Never
- Settlements: Amatitlán, Villa Canales, Villa Nueva

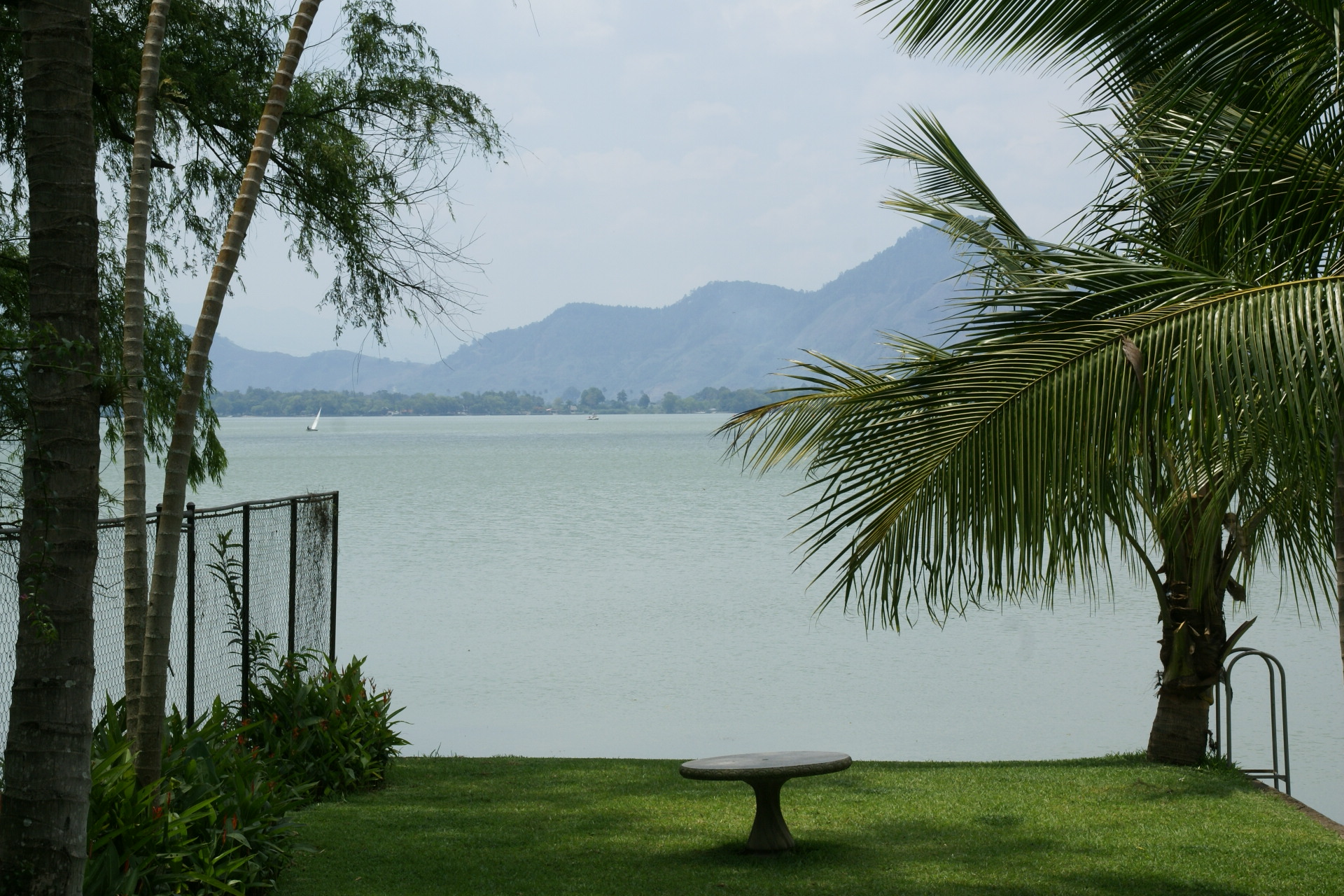

Lake Amatitlán (Lago Amatitlán, Spanish pronunciation: [laɣo amatiˈtlan]) is a lake located within the Amatitlán caldera in south-central Guatemala, fairly close to Guatemala City. It lies in the central highlands, 1,186 m (3890 feet) above sea level. Its maximum depth is 33 m (108 feet) and an average of 18 m (59 feet). The lake is 11 km (7 miles) long and 3 km (2 miles) across at its widest; with an area of 15.2 square kilometers (5.9 sq mi) and a water volume of 0.286 cubic kilometers.

The lake's primary inflow is the Villalobos River, and the lake is drained by the Michatoya River, an important tributary of the María Linda River. The town of Amatitlán is situated at the head of the Michatoya river. A dam with a railway on top was constructed at the narrowest point, thus effectively dividing the lake into two water bodies with different physical, chemical and biological characteristics: a north-western and a south-eastern basin.

The lake was used as a water source, for navigation and transportation, sightseeing and tourism. Until around 2010 when rapid pollution turned the lake green and the shores are full of plastic. The local population has tried to clean it but the lake remains heavily polluted and unswimmable.

== History ==
As of 1850, the lake was used as a bathing lake and a resort area in the spring. Nearby hot springs were also popular with visitors.

== Economy ==
In the mid 19th century, the lake was plentiful with crawfish, sardines, and other seafood. The seafood was captured and sold for the local region, as seafood was rarely imported into the area.

== Pollution ==
Amatitlán lake's catchment area includes Guatemala City. Each year large quantities of untreated sewage, industrial waste and a staggering 500,000 tons of sediment are carried into the lake through the Villalobos River. Specifically, the lake takes in about 75,000 tons of waste from Guatemala City every year. This has contributed to high levels of pollution of the lake's water, and accelerated eutrophication and siltation. This has seriously affected the lake's former function as a source of drinking water and irrigation, and reduced its recreational functions.

In the early 1990s under President Jorge Serrano Elias, a deal was made with a German company to use specialized machinery to clean the lake. But while the lake was already half way cleaned, corrupt political rivals staged a coup with the help of Soap and detergent manufacturers who were contaminating the lake along with other Guatemalan businesses and kicked him out of the office and the deal was canceled, and the lake was never cleaned and all other attempts to clean it have been futile.

In early 2015, the Lake Amatitlan Authority commission granted a contract to the Israeli company M. Tarcic Engineering Ltd. for 137.8 million quetzals, to purchase 93 000 liters of an alleged decontaminant that it would apply to Lake Amatitlán. However, after complains and legal action from scientists, academia, politicians and environmentalists who questioned the Israeli company contract, then vice president Roxana Baldetti suspended the project on 30 March 2015 and froze both the payment to the company and any decontaminant pouring into the lake. Furthermore, Baldetti was forced to resign in early May 2015 due to the La Linea corruption case.

== Gallery ==
Media related to Lago de Amatitlán at Wikimedia Commons

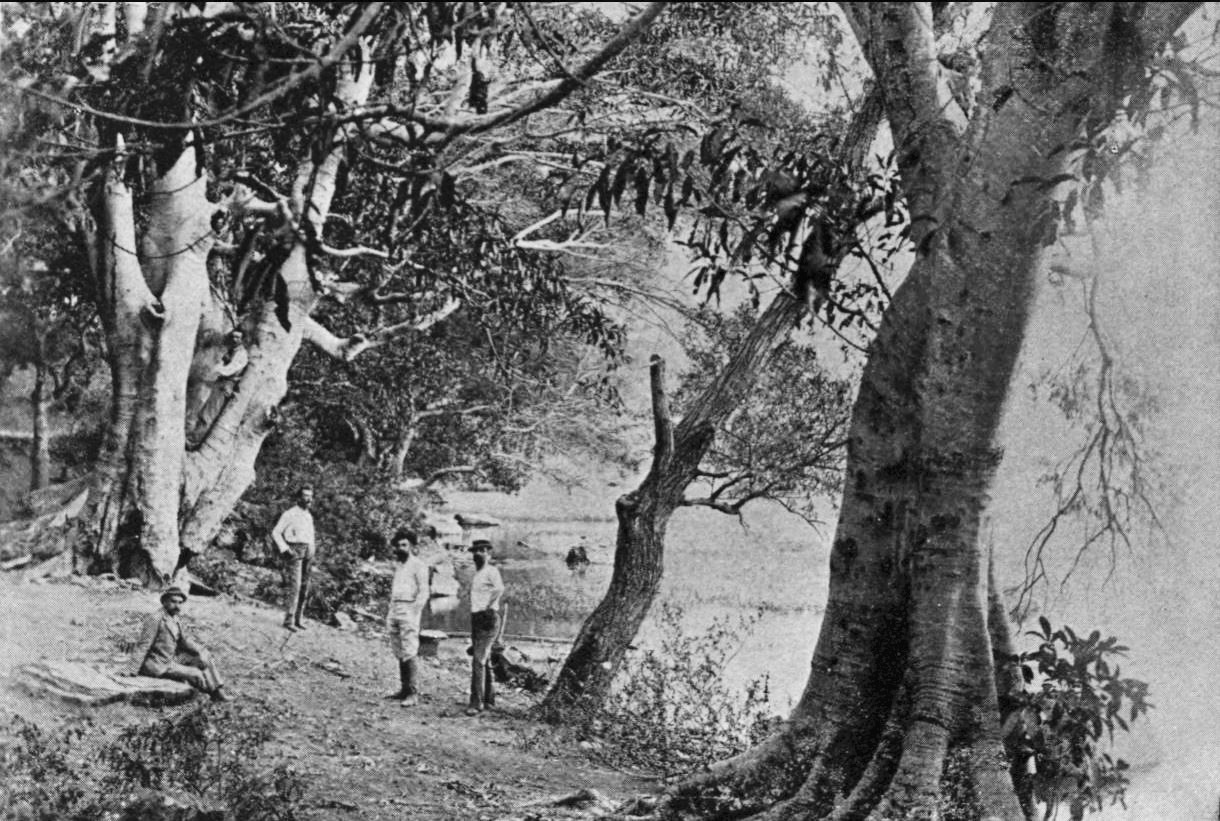
1897

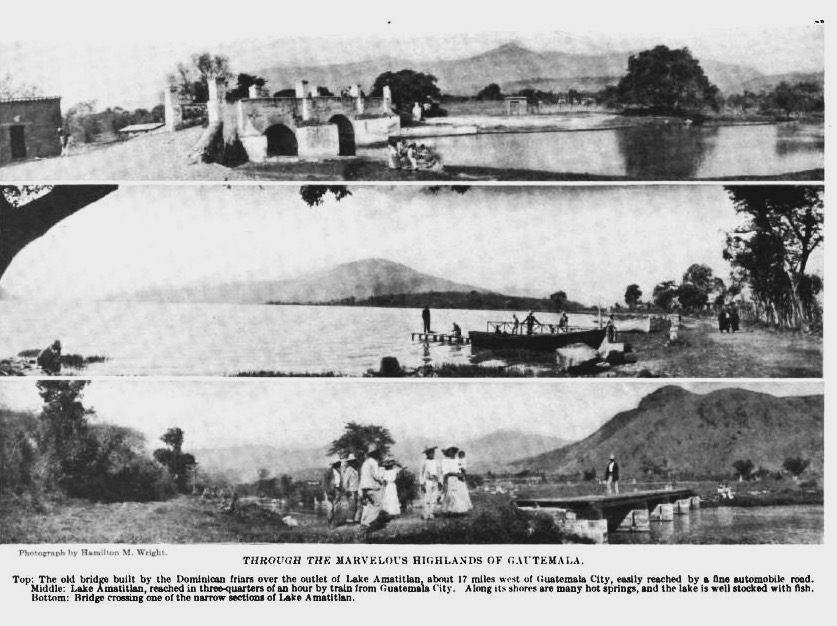
Early 20th century

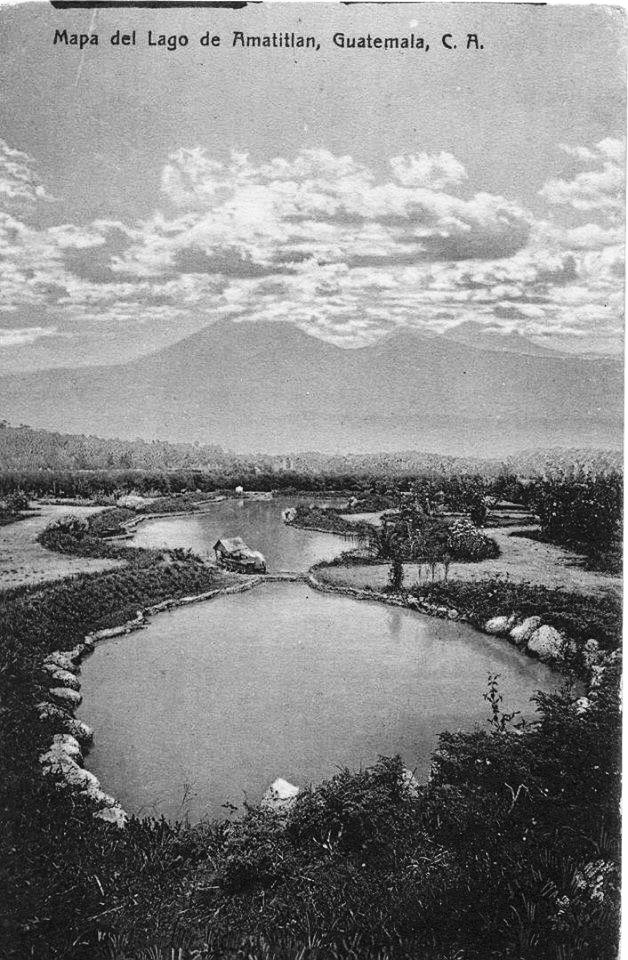
Lake model in «La Aurora» zoo in Guatemala City, ca. 1925.

== Notes and references ==
=== Bibliography ===
- Anton, Danilo J. (1993). Thirsty Cities: Urban Environments and Water Supply in Latin America. Ottawa, Ont.: International Development Research Centre (IDRC). ISBN 0-88936-666-7.
- Muñoz, c.; Velasquez, E.; Aragon, Y.R. (1978). Estudio de aguas subterráneas en el Valle de la Ciudad de Guatemala (in Spanish). Guatemala City: Ministerio de Comunicaciones y Obras Publicas, Instituto Nacional de Sismología, Vulcanología, Meteorología e Hidrológica.
- Valdeavellano, Alberto G. (1897). "Orillas del Lago de Amatitlán". La Ilustración Guatemalteca (in Spanish). I (14). Guatemala.
