= Santa María Dam =

Dam in Zunil, Guatemala

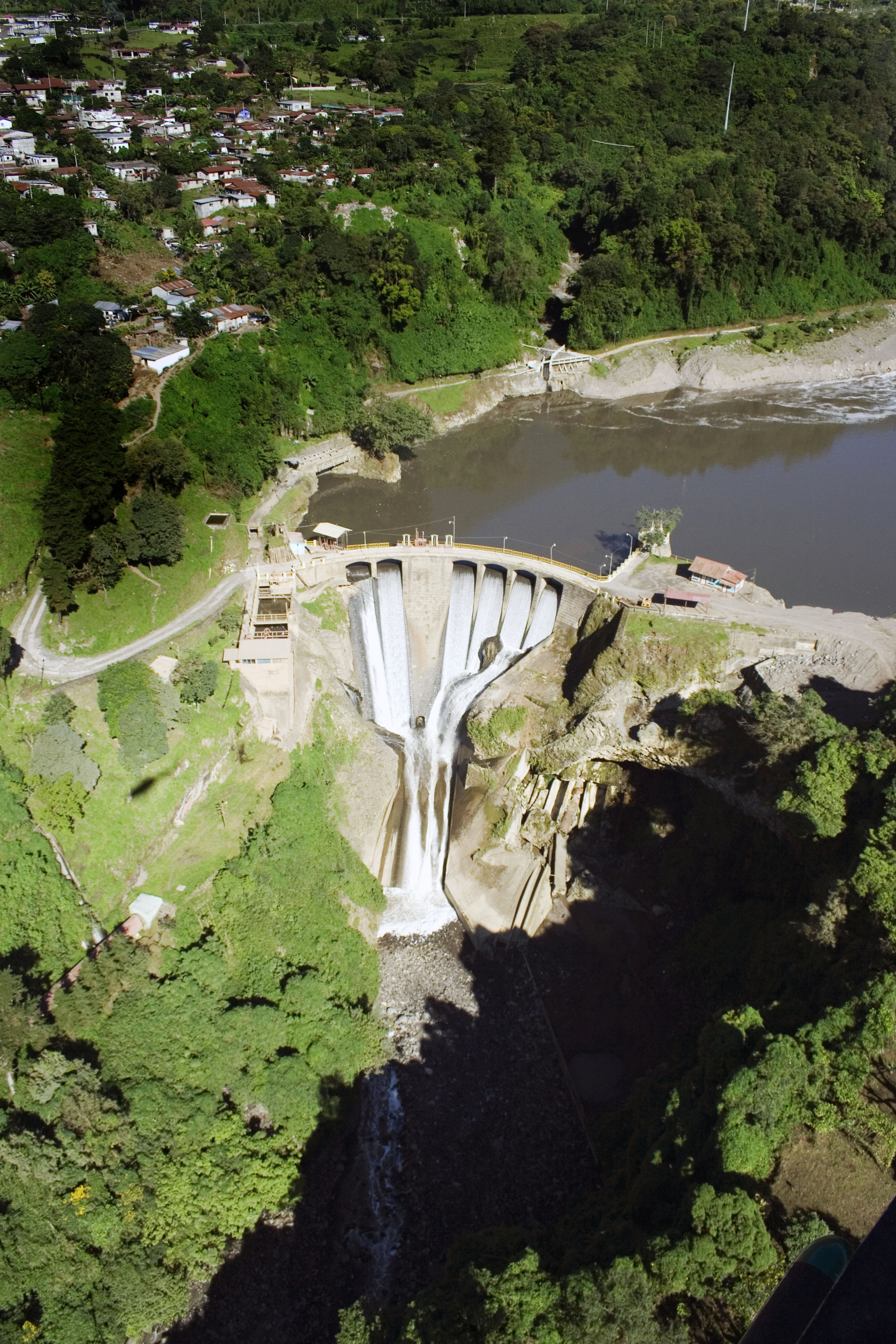
- Official name: Planta Hidroeléctrica Santa María
- Location: Zunil (Quetzaltenango)
- Coordinates: 14.721944°N 91.522894°W
- Opening date: 1927

Dam and spillways
- Impounds: Samalá River

Reservoir
- Total capacity: 215,500 m^{3}

The Santa María Dam (Spanish: Planta Hidroeléctrica Santa María) is a reinforced concrete gravity dam and power plant spanning the Samalá River in Zunil, Escuintla, Guatemala.

The dam's reservoir has a total capacity of 215,500 m^{3}. The water is transported to the powerhouse through 614 m long pressure pipe. The plant has 3 different turbines (1 × 2.48 MW and 2 × 2.2 MW) with a total installed capacity of 6.88 MW. The plant has a level declination of 101 m, and a designed flow of 2.35 m^{3}/s for unit 1 and 2, and 2.42 m^{3}/s for unit 3.

The plant that became operational in 1927 annually produces 38 GWh of electrical power.

== See also ==
- List of hydroelectric power stations in Guatemala
