= San Raimundo =

San Raymundo
- Municipality
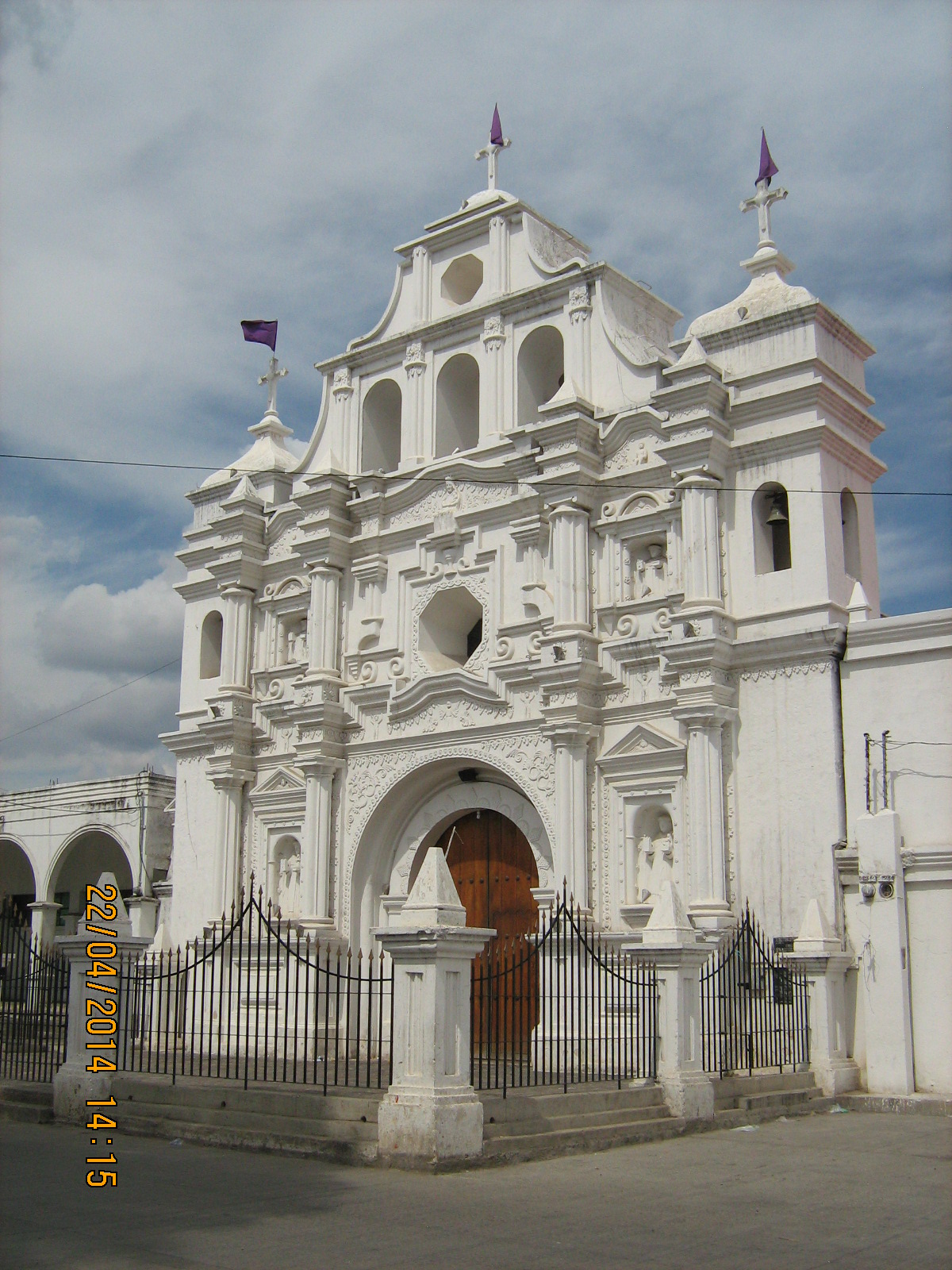

- Location within Guatemala Department
- Coordinates: 14.7647°N 90.5956°W
- Country: Guatemala
- Department: Guatemala

Area
  - Total: 110 km^{2} (42 sq mi)

Population (2018 census)
  - Total: 31,605
  - Density: 290/km^{2} (740/sq mi)
- Time zone: GMT -6

San Raymundo is a town and municipality in the Guatemala Department of Guatemala. The municipality has a population of 31,605 (2018 census) and the town 15,447. It covers an area of 110 km^{2}. It consists of 10 outlying villages and several smaller urbanized areas. San Raymundo is highly populated by both Ladino (Spanish descent) and Indigenous (Mayan descent) people.
