= 2025 Guatemala City bus crash =

Bus accident in Guatemala

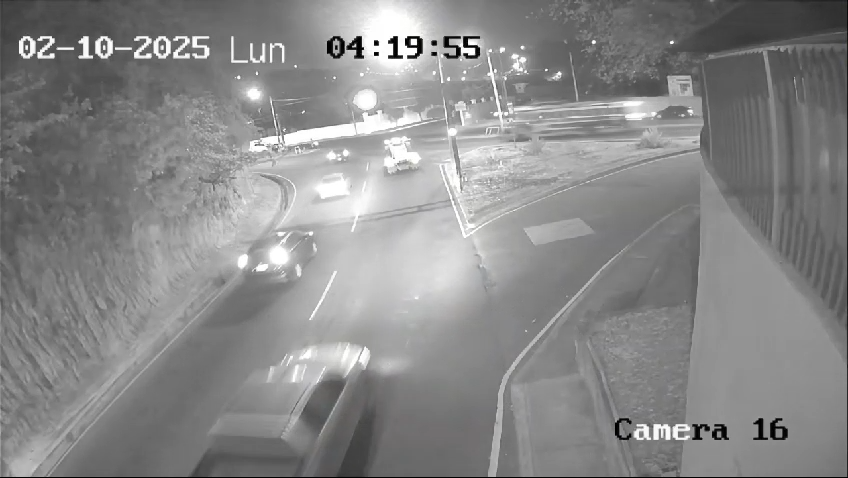
- CCTV image showing the bus (blurred by rapid motion) at upper right, moments before the crash.

- Location of the accident 2025 Guatemala City bus crash (Guatemala)

Details
- Date: February 10, 2025 c. 4:30 a.m. (GMT-6)
- Location: Zone 6, Las Vacas River, Guatemala City
- Coordinates: 14°39′00″N 90°29′07″W
- Country: Guatemala
- Incident type: Roadway departure
- Cause: Under investigation

Statistics
- Bus: 1
- Passengers: 70+
- Deaths: 55+ (including the bus driver and a Mexican national)
- Injured: 9+

In the early morning of February 10, 2025, a bus carrying around 70 passengers veered off a bridge and fell into the Las Vacas River after colliding with other vehicles in Zone 6, on the outskirts of Guatemala City, Guatemala. The crash killed at least 55 people and seriously injured nine.

The vehicle was operating as a commuter bus, but outside of its approved route. Although the bus was licensed correctly, the driver did not have an appropriate license. Investigators are exploring a wide range of causes, including overloading, weapons, drugs, or mechanical problems. In the aftermath of the crash, updated legislation was proposed to improve road safety, after other relief efforts were underway.

== Background ==
The bus was an extra-urban transport unit owned by Transportes Tineca Sociedad Anónima. It was densely occupied with more than 70 people, mostly patients, pupils, as well as other passengers going to work. It departed from El Progreso Department (Note: Divergent sources reported that the bus departed from either San Agustín Acasaguastlán or San Antonio La Paz in that department.) at around 4 a.m. (GMT-6).

== Crash ==
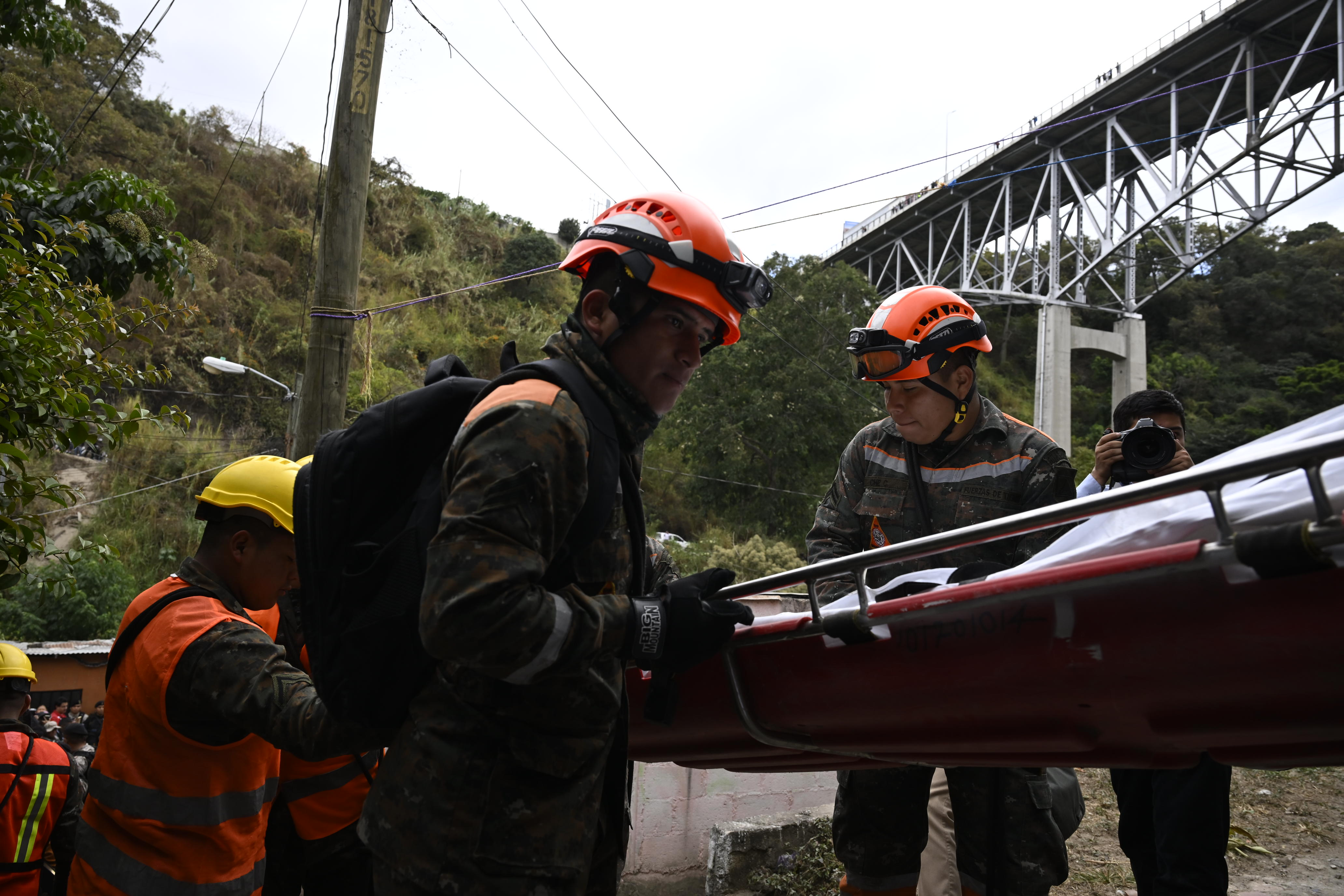
Members of the army and police participating in the search-and-rescue efforts

The bus was entering Guatemala City when a CCTV camera caught the bus moving at high speed at 4:19:55 a.m. (GMT-6). Moments later, it collided with protective railing and two automobiles before descending into the ravine at around 4:30 a.m. The bus fell approximately 20 metres (66 ft) (Note: Other sources give 35 metres (115 ft)) off the Belize Bridge (Puente Belice) highway into the sewage-polluted Las Vacas River.

The National Civil Police stated that they were supporting search and rescue efforts. Mayor of Guatemala City Ricardo Quiñónez Lemus said that emergency services had been deployed while traffic police worked on establishing alternate routes in the affected area.

== Victims ==
Despite the initial report of 56 casualties, (Note: Guatemala City Fire Department spokesman Carlos Hernández said that 52 died at the scene, and four died in hospital.) a list of 54 fatal victims and their ages was released the following day. Fifty-three died at the scene, reportedly including the 24-year-old driver, and two died in hospital after being rescued, bringing the number of fatalities to 55. Out of the nine people hospitalized as of February 10 (five in one hospital and four in another), two died.

Mynor Ruano, a spokesman for the city's fire service, said that efforts were underway "to save other people who are trapped" in the wreckage. The bodies of 36 men and 15 women were sent to a provincial morgue.

== Investigation ==
Minister of Communications, Infrastructure and Housing Miguel Ángel Díaz Bobadilla initiated an investigation that revealed the bus had been active for 30 years but still had a valid license to operate. He said that the cause of the accident was still unknown and that investigators were looking into whether the bus was overloaded with passengers.

Investigators said they would check if the driver could have lost control due to brake fade.

On the same day, the Public Ministry of Guatemala (Ministerio Público, MP) requested a post-mortem examination on the body of Billy Aníbal Foronda Azañón, the 24-year-old bus driver, to detect the presence of possible drugs. Preliminary investigations determined that his driver's license was for light noncommercial vehicles, not mass transit. The bus also was at an unapproved route.

In addition, police found a gun in the wreckage, raising speculation that the driver may have been threatened with the gun. National Civil Police deputy director-general Helver Beltetón said the weapon was registered to a deceased passenger who worked as a private security guard, adding that "the brakes could have failed but we're also not ruling out an accident or a criminal act; all that will be investigated".

By February 15, the wreckage still remained at the accident site as the MP prosecutors continued to inspect it.

== Reactions ==
=== Domestic ===
President Bernardo Arévalo declared three days of national mourning and deployed the Guatemalan army along with the disaster agency to provide response efforts.

President of the Congress of Guatemala Nery Ramos lamented that "more than four dozen Guatemalans lost their lives in search of daily sustenance".

During an interview on TV Azteca Guate, deputy César Dávila stressed that a proposal to support victims' families was submitted at a meeting with parliamentary group leaders of the Congress. He also pointed out that they have discussed updating the traffic code, in force since 1996, to improve road safety and hold carriers responsible.

Father Rigoberto Pérez, a vicar in Guatemala City and a longtime communications officer in the Guatemalan Catholic Church, stated the tragedy revealed the risks and disorganization that many Guatemalan workers face everyday.

=== International ===
Governments such as those of Taiwan, Nicaragua, the Maldives, and El Salvador expressed their condolences to the victims' families and the Guatemalan people.

Pope Francis sent an apostolic blessing in a message read by Francisco Montecillo Padilla, the Apostolic Nuncio to Guatemala, during a mass at the Cathedral of Guatemala City in memory of the victims of the accident.

== See also ==
- 2008 Villa Canales bus disaster
- 2025 Escárcega bus crash, occurred in Mexico two days prior
- Bus transport in Central America
- List of traffic collisions (2000–present)
- Multiple-vehicle collision
- Transport in Guatemala
