= San José del Golfo =

- Location in Guatemala
- Coordinates: 14°45′36″N 90°22′48″W
- Country: Guatemala
- Department: Guatemala Department
- Settled: 1882
- Incorporated to El Progreso Department: 1908
- Incorporated to Guatemala Department: 1920

Area
  - Total: 32 sq mi (84 km^{2})
- Elevation: 3,050 ft (930 m)

Population (2002)
  - Total: 5,156
- Climate: Aw

San José del Golfo is a municipality in the Guatemala department of Guatemala. The Municipality of San José del Golfo is located 28 kilometers from the Capital City to the north-east of Guatemala. Its territory is broken, it belongs to the mountainous region of the Central Highlands of the Republic. The Municipality of San José del Golfo, was established under the Government of general Justo Rufino Barrios, by Decree No. 683 of March 17, 1882, and was annexed to the El Progreso Department on April 13, 1908, however years later by Decree No. 756 on June 9, 1920 it joined the Guatemala Department.

== Mining ==
San José del Golfo has abundant natural resources, with traditional quartz mining. However, the gold mining proyect of "El Tambor" has been opposed firmly by a community group called "La Puya" (English: "The sting") since 2012, as it accuses the mining of environmental pollution. Here is the sequence of events that have occurred at the location:

Date	Events
2 March 2012	A female resident from San José del Golfo, worried about the sudden arrival of gold mining to her community decided to park her car across the unpaved road that lead into the mining facility therefore stopping a machinery convoy that was headed that way. Other community members swiftly joined the protest in order to defend their water sources, agricultural land, health and the environment from the pollution caused by gold mining and decided to camp 24 hours a day, every day in front of the mine entrance.; The affected mining companies are: Radius Gold, from Canada; Kappes, Cassiday & Associates, from the United States; and the Guatemalan Servicios Mineros de Centroamérica.
20 December 2013	A study reveals that local women have shown their determination and leadership in front of their men given that they have been able to successfully keep a twenty-month camp outside of "El Tambor" mine.
27 February 2014	The mining company withdraws its equipment from San José del Golfo.
23 May 2014	After being in front of "El Tambor" mine for several hours to prevent equipment from getting inside the mining facility, several community members of "La Puya" were dispersed by the special anti riot unit of the National Police. In spite of the Human Rights Procurement office personnel on site, who wanted to reach a peaceful agreement between the parts, they could not reach to any agreement and police use tear gas to disperse the community members, including children.; The Secretary of the Interior, Mauricio López Bonilla, had already warned "La Puya" members that he was going to use force to open the way for the mining equipment to enter "El tambor" and also that, in case there were any altercation, there would be arrests; he argued that he was allowing the free locomotion rights of the people.; Voluntary Firemen corps reported that they had to assist twenty one injuries and that eleven police officers had to be taken to the Police hospital.; Extractive Industries association president, Mario Orellana, pointed out that the anti industry atmosphere was sending a negative massage to international corporations interested in investing in Guatemala.; The Guatemala Chamber of Industry president, Fernando López, lamented the altercation but praised the government actions, indicating that the private property and freedom of locomotion rights prevailed.
27 May 2014	Four "La Puya" community leaders go on trial after the 2012 events, when they allegedly kept several mining company personnel against their will. The leaders are held at home detention.; The Human Rights Procurement office announced that it was going to review the event's videotapes to verify whether "La Puya" members human rights were violated.
26 May 2015	After a peaceful discussion, "La Puya" members allowed at least thirty mining employees to leave the premises in San José del Golfo. Given the tense situation that was created around this event, the National Police sent their anti riot team, just as a prevention, but it did not see action.
4 August 2015	Several trucks escorted by anti riot police entered "El Tambor" mine; upon noticing this situation, numerous community members blocked the main entrance to prevent more trucks from going in. Once again, the judiciary system alleged that the freedom of locomotion rights was being violated and asked the community to disperse.

== Natural disasters ==
San José del Golfo was practically destroyed by the powerful 4 February 1976 earthquake; it has been rebuilt since, although the original colonial architecture was completely lost in the disaster.
