= 2008 Villa Canales bus disaster =

Fatal bus crash in Guatemala

Coordinates: 14°27′34″N 90°28′42″W

Details
- Date: 29 February 2008; 19:15
- Location: Villa Canales
- Country: Guatemala

Statistics
- Bus: 1
- Passengers: 79
- Deaths: 56
- Injured: 25

The 2008 Villa Canales bus disaster occurred in the municipality of Villa Canales, Guatemala on 29 February 2008, at 19:15 local time. A passenger bus from Transportes Cubanita, with 79 people on board, crashed into a 10-meter ravine after missing a sharp bend in the road connecting Villa Canales to Barberena. Fifty-six people died and another 25 were wounded in the crash.

== Events ==
In the night of 29 February 2008, a bus of the Cubanita Transport Company (Spanish: Empresa de Transportes Cubanita), crashed when circulating on the road from Guatemala to El Salvador, in the 33.5km between Villa Canales and Barberena. While the maximum capacity of the bus was 50 passengers, there were 78 passengers aboard. 48 passengers died immediately in the crash, while 8 more died later, making a total of 56 deaths.

== Investigation ==
The Cubanita company is owned by the national congressman Aníbal Salguero. He initially claimed that he sold the bus to the driver, but the investigation determined that the contract of sale was forged. This finding led to the Supreme Court of Justice lifting Salguero's congressional immunity. In November 2009, a court dismissed the penal case against Salguero on procedural grounds. Salguero paid 3 million quetzal to 70 victims. In 2010, a court sentenced the notary who forged the contract to 3 years in prison.

== See also ==
- 2025 Guatemala City bus crash
- List of traffic collisions (2000–present)
