= Infiernillo Dam =

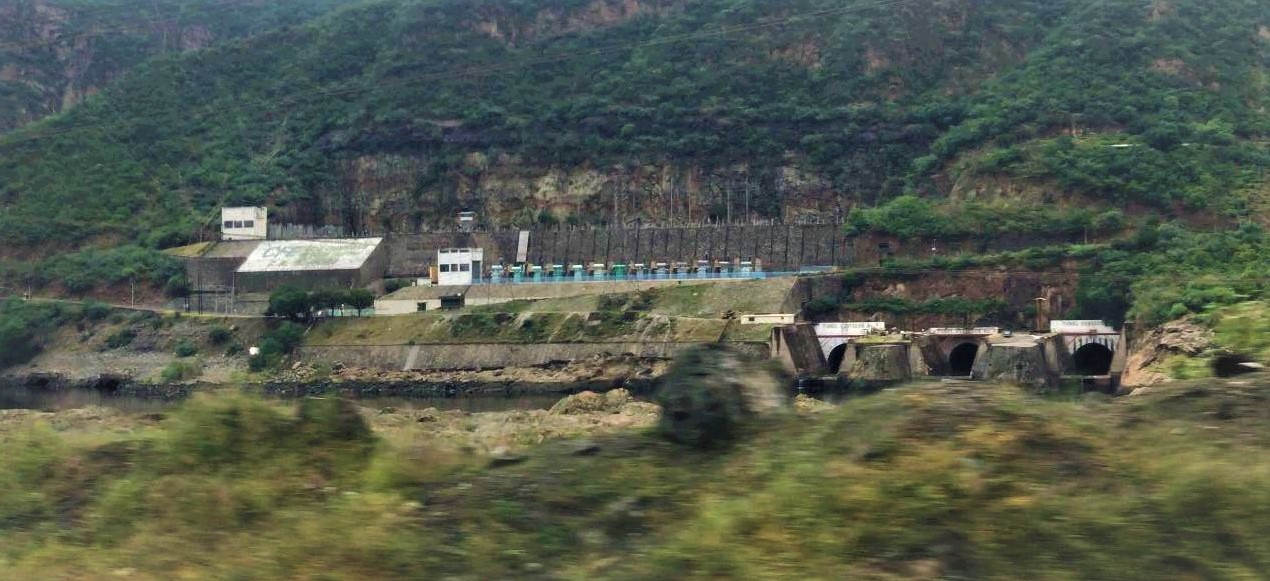

- Location within Mexico
- Official name: Presa Adolfo López Mateos
- Country: Mexico
- Location: Arteaga, Michoacán
- Coordinates: 18°16′23″N 101°53′34″W
- Status: In use
- Opening date: 1965
- Owner: Comisión Federal de Electricidad

Dam and spillways
- Height: 149 m (489 ft)
- Length: 344 m (1,129 ft)
- Width (base): 570 m (1,870 ft)
- Dam volume: 5,500,000 m^{3} (194,230,667 ft^{3})

Reservoir
- Creates: Infiernillo Reservoir
- Total capacity: 12,000,000,000 m^{3} (9,728,558 acre⋅ft)

Power Station
- Commission date: 1965
- Installed capacity: 1,120 MW

The Infiernillo Dam ("Little hell"), also known as Adolfo López Mateos Dam, is an embankment dam on the Balsas River near La Unión, Guerrero, Mexico. It is on the border between the states of Guerrero and Michoacán. The dam supports a hydroelectric power station containing six turbine-generators for a total installed capacity of 1,120 MW. The dam is 149 m (489 ft) high, 344 m (1,129 ft) long and is owned by Comisión Federal de Electricidad. Its first generator was operational on January 25, 1965.

Placement of the dam embankment began in August 1962, and on December 7, 1963, the dam was topped off. The diversion tunnels were closed and the reservoir began to fill on June 15, 1964.
