= Aguacapa Dam =

Dam in Guanazapa, Guatemala

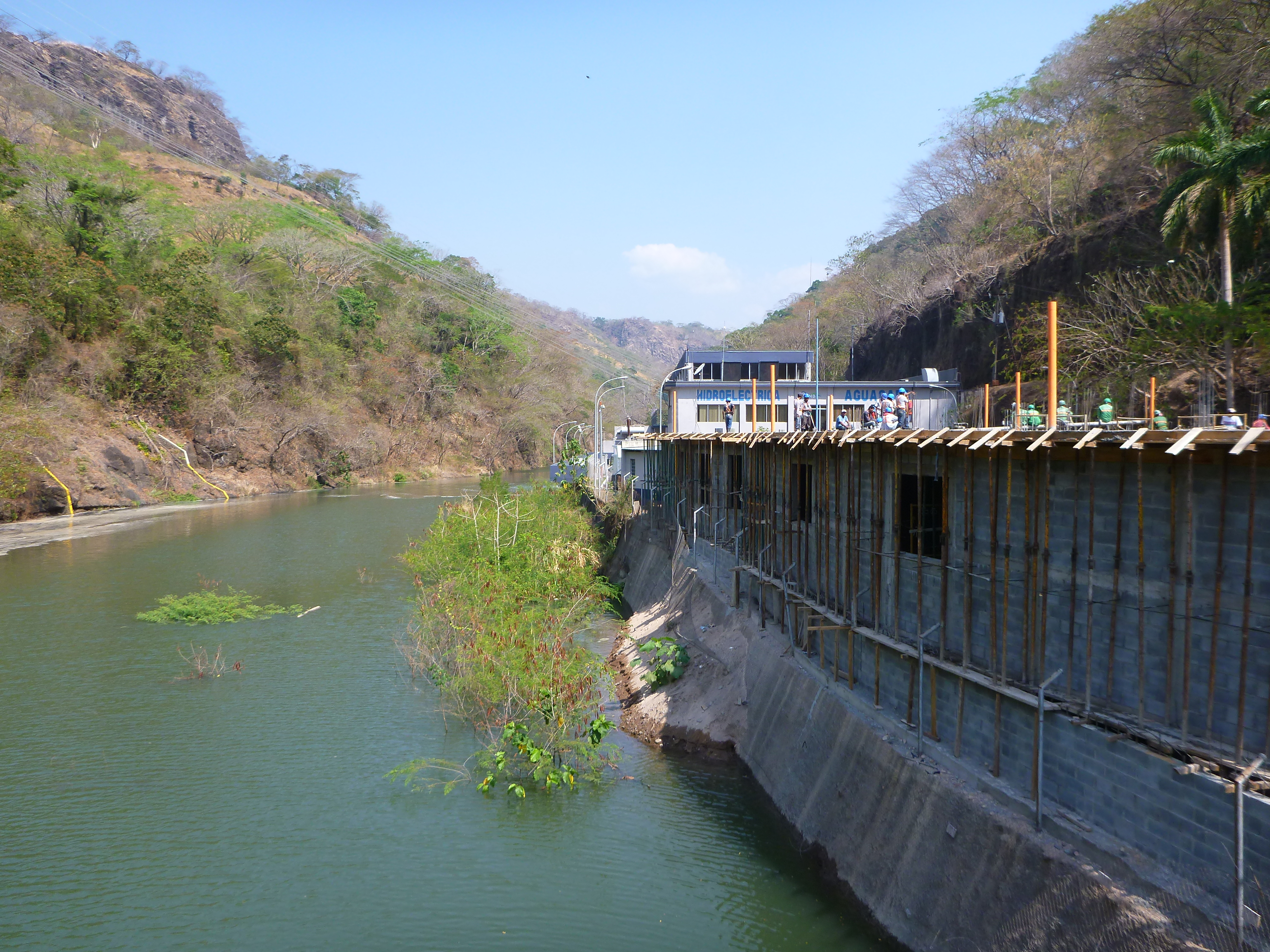
- Aguacapa Hydroelectric Power Plant

- Location within Guatemala
- Official name: Planta Hidroeléctrica Aguacapa
- Location: Guanazapa (Escuintla)
- Coordinates: 14°17′29″N 90°30′18″W
- Opening date: 1981

Dam and spillways
- Impounds: Aguacapa River

Reservoir
- Total capacity: 300,000 m^{3}

The Aguacapa Dam (Spanish: Presa de Aguacapa) is a reinforced concrete gravity dam and power plant spanning the Aguacapa River in Escuintla, Guatemala.

The dam's reservoir has a total capacity of 300,000 m^{3}. The water is transported to the powerhouse through a 12.04 km long tunnel and a 3.65 km long pressure tube. The plant has 3 × 30 MW Pelton turbines, with a total installed capacity of 90 MW. The plant has a net level declination of 490.6 m, and a designed flow of 7.33 m^{3}/s per unit.

The plant's total output between 1981 and 2006 was 6600.96 GWh, which amounts to an average annual electricity generation of 264 GWh.

== See also ==
- List of hydroelectric power stations in Guatemala
