= Bernardo Quintana =

Chilean mythographer and physician

Bernardo Quintana Mansilla (1916–2012) was a Chilean mythographer and physician. He is best known for his work in collecting and recording the Chilote mythology of Chiloé Archipelago in southern Chile. His use of radiography earned him a reputation of warlock in Chiloé. Quintana was a Rotarian and mason and was politically aligned with the Radical Party. He published his book Chiloé mitológico in 1972 and this book was approved the same year to be used in Chilean elementary schools.
