= Motagua River =

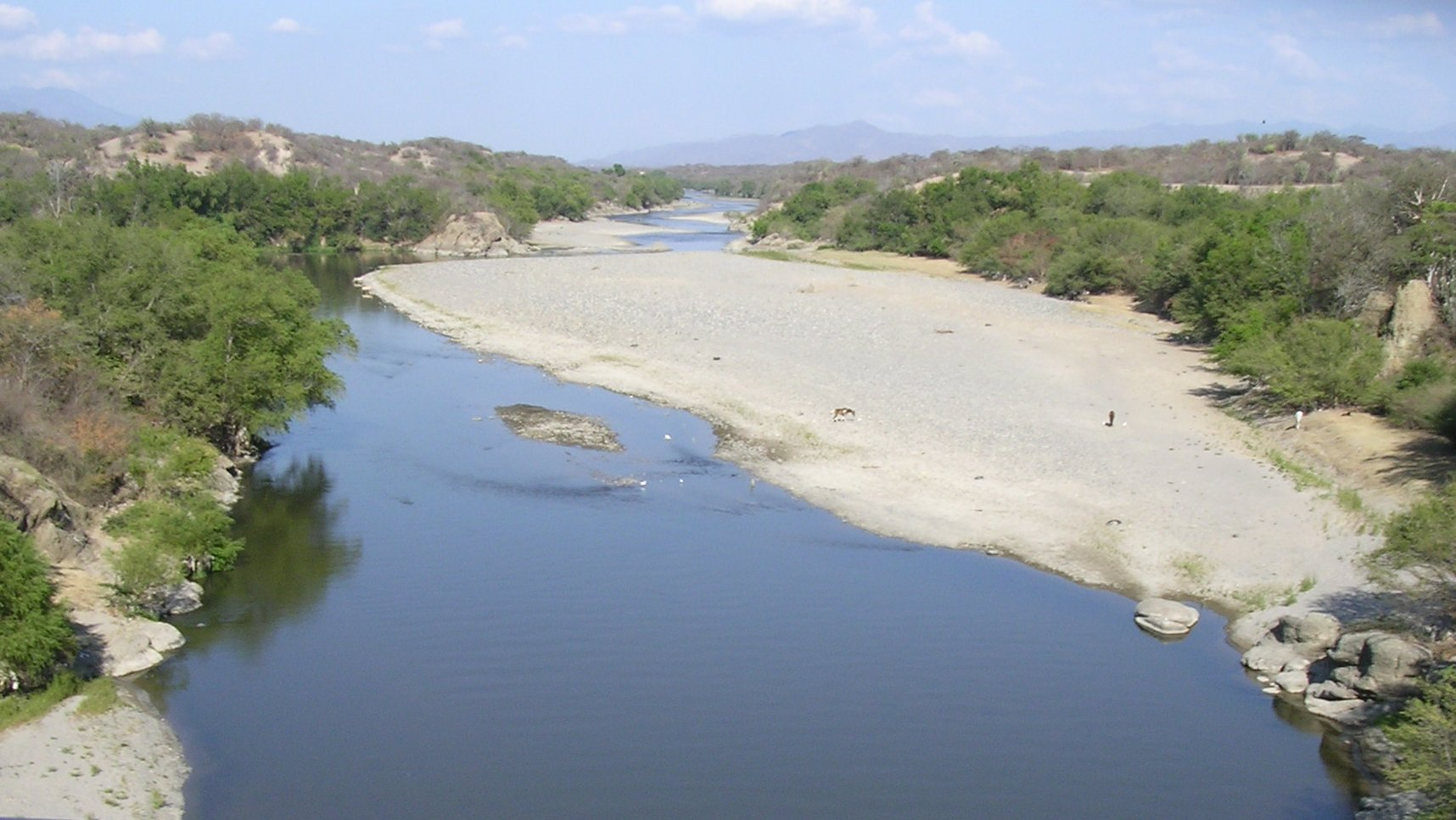
- The Motagua River during the dry season

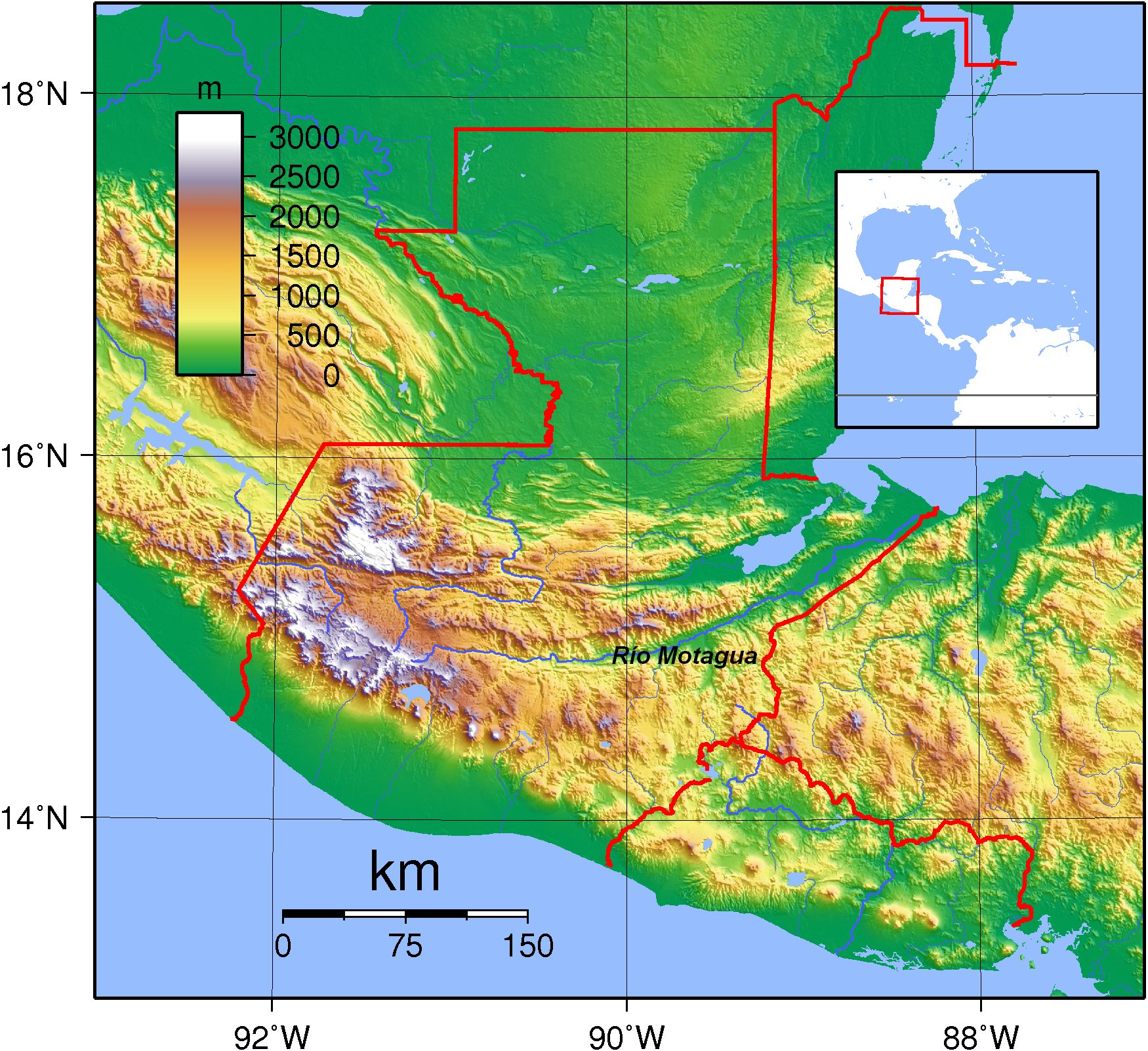
- The Motagua River, flowing from the highlands in western Guatemala to the coast at the Guatemala–Honduras border

Location
- Countries: Guatemala and Honduras

Physical characteristics
- Source: Quiché Department
  - coordinates: 14°56′57″N 91°00′32″W
  - elevation: 1,800 m (5,900 ft)
- 2nd source: Baja Verapaz Department
- Mouth: Gulf of Honduras in the Atlantic Ocean
  - location: Puerto Barrios
  - coordinates: 15°43′29″N 88°13′18″W
  - elevation: 0 m (0 ft)
- Length: 486.55 km (302.33 mi)
- Basin size: 12,670 km^{2} (4,890 sq mi)
- Discharge
  - average: 208.7 m^{3}/s (7,370 cu ft/s)

The Motagua River (Spanish pronunciation: [moˈtaɣwa]) is a 486-kilometre-long (302 mi) river in Guatemala. It rises in the Western Highlands of Guatemala and runs in an easterly direction to the Gulf of Honduras. The Motagua River basin covers an area of 12,670 square kilometres (4,890 sq mi) and is the largest in Guatemala.

The Motagua River valley contains sources of jadeitite, which has been used by many Indigenous communities that have inhabited the region. The Motagua River is also one of the most plastic-emitting rivers in the world, contributing around two percent of global plastic pollution emissions into oceans annually. Conservation efforts have been driven by the government and non-governmental organizations to ensure safe water and clean oceans.

== Course ==
The river begins in the Western Highlands of Guatemala and runs along the Atlantic slope. Traveling in an easterly direction, it passes through 14 of Guatemala's departments and contains seven distinct ecoregions. Along its course, water flows in from 29 other major rivers. The final few kilometres of the river form part of the Guatemala–Honduras border. The river mouth opens at El Quetzalito Beach, which is located along the Guatemalan coast, and flows into the Gulf of Honduras.

The Motagua River valley also marks the Motagua Fault, the tectonic boundary between the North American and the Caribbean Plates. The Motagua fault has been the source of several major earthquakes in Guatemala.

== History ==
The river runs in a valley that has the only known source of jadeitite (jade) in Mesoamerica. Green jade, which was used by the Aztec and Maya people, was re-discovered in the 1950s by American geologist William Foshag, who was directed by a local tomato farmer. The rarer blue-green jade, used by the Olmec people, was re-discovered further north of the river in 2002.

The Olmecs were believed to have first settled in the Motagua River valley in around 3000 BC. They constructed figures, masks, and ornaments using the blue-green jade. The Maya likely settled in the Motagua River valley in around 2000 BC. They used the green jade to make beads and amulets. These objects were often used for religious rituals or to signify wealth. The Maya site of Copán, located along the river, contains several ruins of monuments and religious structures. The important Maya site of Quirigua is near the river's north bank, as are several smaller sites with jade quarries and workshops.

The river was also an important commerce route during the Pre-Columbian era. The trade route played a role in facilitating the transfer of goods, ideas, and even people. The river's use as a trade route is evidenced by jade items and specific methods of pottery having been discovered across multiple different regions in Mesoamerica.

== Pollution ==
=== History ===
Pollution is reported to have first affected the river in 2003 when industrial waste from a power plant in Guatemala City was carried down the Río Las Vacas, one of its tributaries. Those living along the river were instructed not to use the contaminated water for drinking, cooking, or cleaning.

=== Water Quality ===
The water quality of rivers in Guatemala is generally poor because there are no standard measures for maintaining river water conditions. Water quality regulation policy also often fails to dictate responsibilities between the government and individual departments, and has not been adequately implemented or coordinated at the administrative level. Despite this, attempts at legislation to improve water quality regulation have often prolonged for multiple years in the Guatemalan Congress.

The river is highly polluted with untreated sewage, industrial waste, tons of sediment (garbage) and blackwater from Guatemala City carried by the Río Las Vacas tributary. It is one of the world's most polluted rivers and accounts for about two percent of plastic emissions into the world's oceans. Those living along the river also contribute to the pollution, as each person disposes, on average, 1.15 pounds of waste each day.

=== Outcomes ===
As the pollution from the river reaches the Caribbean, it begins to harm marine environments. This pollution is especially dangerous in the marine protected areas of Honduras and Guatemala, in which conservation efforts are prioritized in an effort to maintain species diversity. The pollution also affects the many Indigenous communities who rely on the resources that the river provides. Additionally, members of coastal communities must often pick up the trash themselves and are financially burdened by the effects of pollution on popular industries such as fishing and tourism.

=== Conservation ===
Though the right to safe drinking water is mandated in Guatemala, it is obstructed by poor waste management regulations and limited government intervention. Much of Guatemala's rural population works in agriculture, which further increases the demand for safe water. The Guatemalan government began to take action by constructing bio-fences to filter waste traveling down the river. They have also worked with the Stockholm International Water Institute to implement the National Water and Sanitation Policy in Guatemala, which outlines a number of objectives to improve regulation and conservation.

Conservation projects such as 4ocean's Project Guatemala seek to involve local government and community members in prioritizing limiting waste from reaching the ocean. The Ocean Cleanup chose the river as the test site for its experimental "Interceptor Trashfence", which attempted to filter out solid pollutants as they flowed downriver. This has been replaced by two improved systems: 1. In May of 2023, Interceptor 006 was installed (down stream from Guatemala City) an "Interceptor Barricade" type (June 13, 2023). The Ocean Cleanup’s deployment of Interceptor 006 in Guatemala is supported by Municipality of Guatemala, Guatemalan Ministry of Environment and Natural Resources, Kia, The Coca-Cola Company, Maersk, Biosfera GT, Aliarse and Worthington Products. 2. At the northeastern end of the Rio Las Vacas, where the river empties into the Gulf of Honduras, and ultimately, leads to the Caribbean Sea, a second Interceptor 021 has been installed by TheOceanCleanup.com. Interceptor 021 is a crucial step towards restoring the Gulf of Honduras to its pristine state. This new project is a collaboration between The Ocean Cleanup and Guatemala’s Ministry of Environment (MARN).

== Tributaries ==
=== Left ===
Río Cocoyá, Río Cotón, Río Suchicul, Río Morazán, Río Comajá, Río Lato, Río Huijo, Río La Palmilla, Río Teculutan, Río Pasabien, Río Hondo, Río Jones, Río Los Achiotes, Río Mayuelas, Río El Lobo, Quebrada Agua Fría, Quebrada La Vegega, Río Las Conchas

=== Right ===
Río Chipaca, Rio Agua Escondida, Rio Quisaya, Rio Pixcayá, Río Cotzibal, Río Las Vacas, Río Grande, Río Ovejas, Río El Tambor, Río San Vicente, Río Grande o Zapaca, Río Carí, Río Las Naranjas, Río Biafra, Río El Islote, Río Jubuco, Río Lagarto, Río Tepemechín, Río Juyamá, Río Bobos, Río Animas, Río Chiquito, Río Nuevo o Cacao
