= San Pedro Ayampuc =

Coordinates: 14°47′N 90°27′W

- Municipality
- Location in Guatemala
- Country: Guatemala
- Department: Guatemala Department

Area
  - Total: 48 sq mi (124 km^{2})

Population (2018 census)
  - Total: 58,609
  - Density: 1,220/sq mi (473/km^{2})
- Climate: Aw

San Pedro Ayampuc is a town, with a population of 48,727 (2018 census), and a municipality in the Guatemala department of Guatemala.

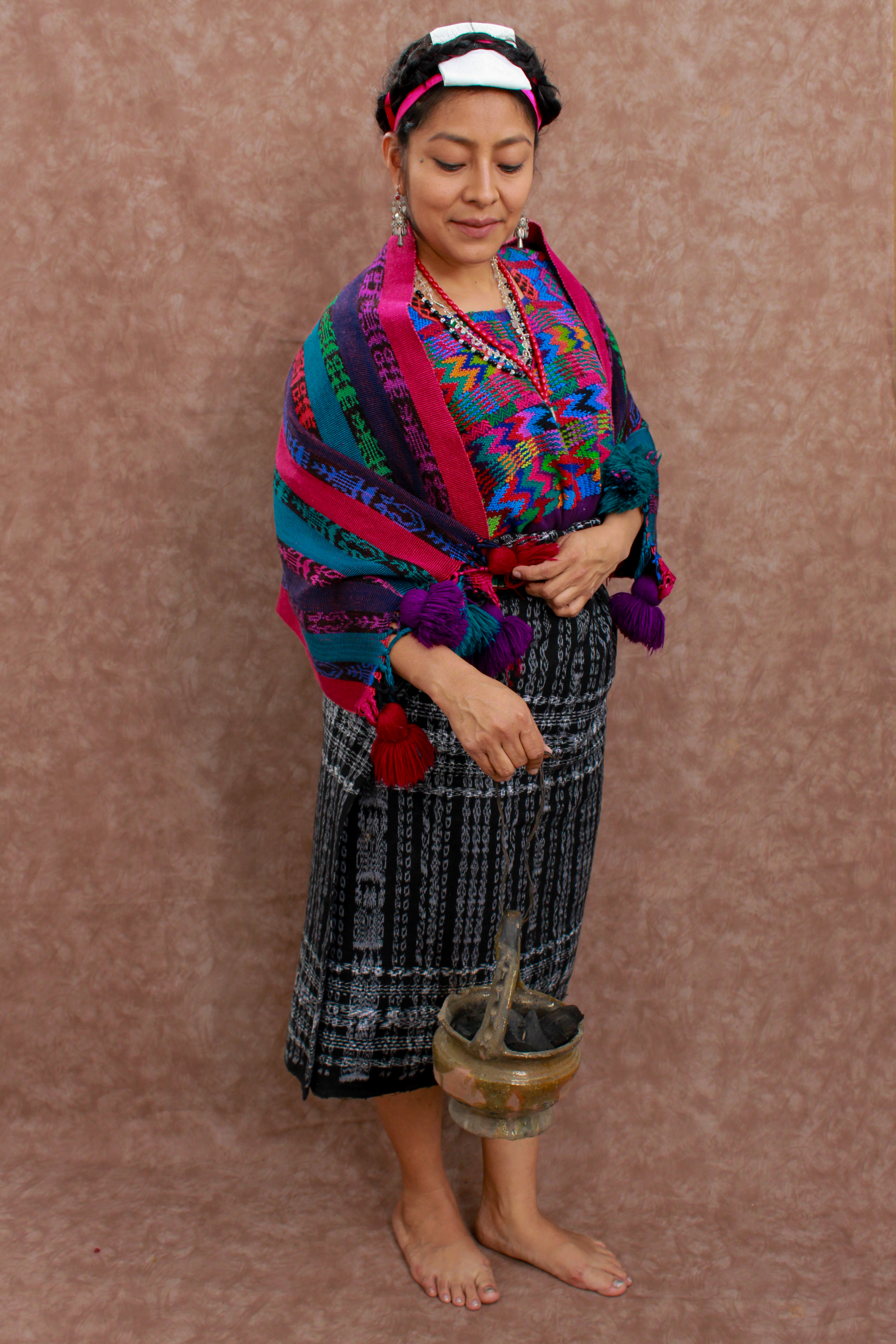
Traditional women's clothing in San Pedro Ayampuc

As of 2025, the current mayor is Nelvi Quiñónez.
