= Michatoya River =

Coordinates: 14.2683°N 90.7288°W

Location
- Country: Guatemala

The Michatoya River is a river in Guatemala. It begins in the town of Amatitlán, flowing out of the lake of the same name, through the towns of Palín, Masagua, and into the Pacific Ocean. It has served as one of the principal sources of electricity for Guatemala City. Sometimes it has overflowed its banks, flooding the city of Amatitlán, until dredging of the riverbed began, which so far has prevented further inundation.

== See also ==
- List of rivers of Guatemala
