= Xalbal River =

Xalbal River/Xaclbal River
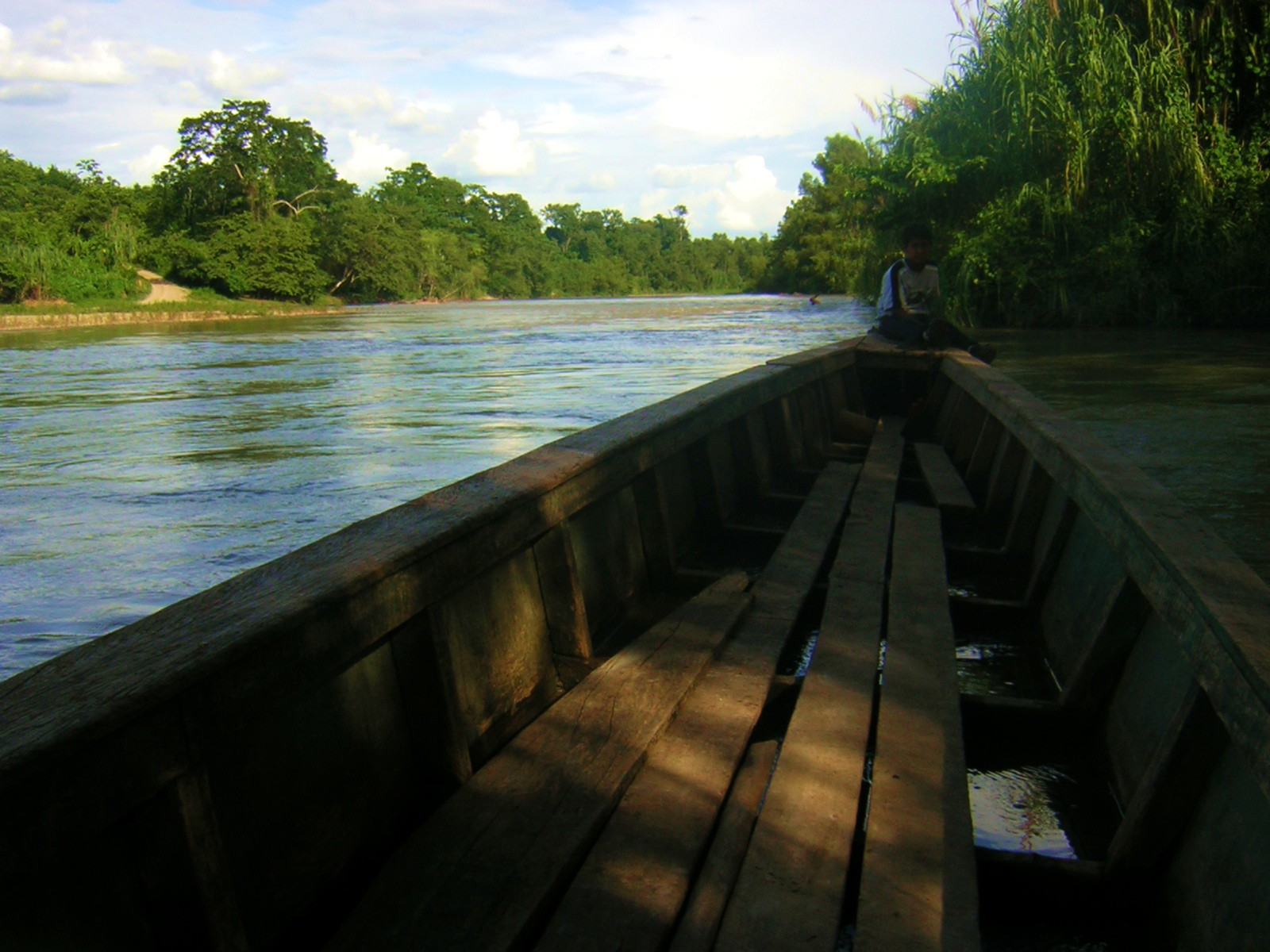
- Xalbal River

Location
- Countries: Guatemala and Mexico

Physical characteristics
- Source
  - location: Guatemala (El Quiché)
- Mouth
  - location: Tributary of the Usumacinta River

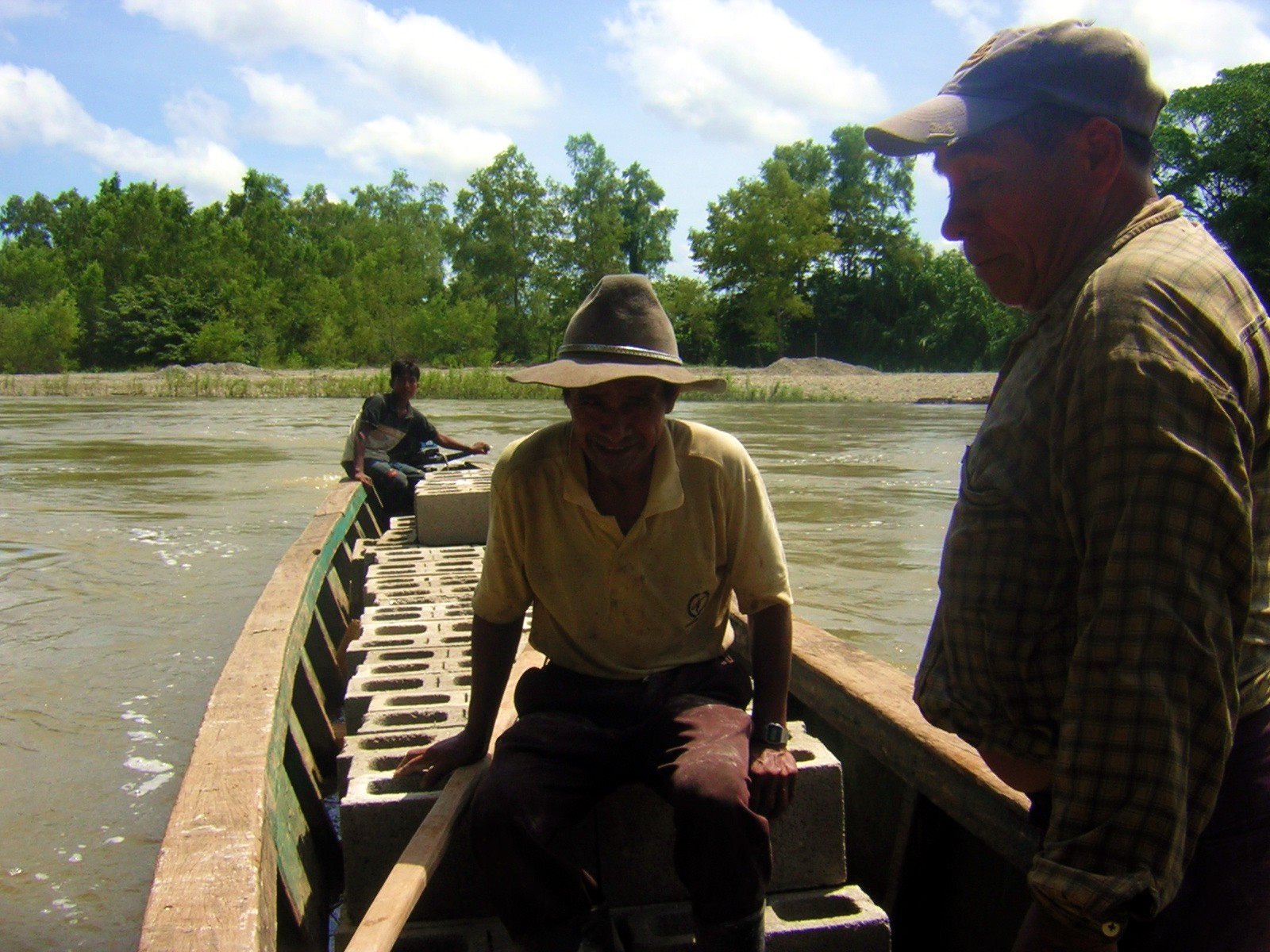
Locals on the river

The Xalbal River (Spanish pronunciation: [ʃalˈβal]) is a river of Guatemala. Its sources are in the Sierra de los Cuchumatanes mountain range (at 15.497769°N 91.132793°W) in the department of El Quiché, where the river is called Río Xaclbal or Río Chajul. The Xaclbal river flows northwards down the tropical lowlands of Ixcan where it is called Río Xalbal (at 15.954727°N 90.925255°W), and crosses the border with Mexico, where it joins the Lacantún River, a tributary of the Usumacinta river. The Guatemalan part of Xaclbal river basin covers an area of 1,366 square kilometres (527 sq mi).

The village of Xalbal, named after the river, suffered a massacre in 1982. The village was abandoned in March 1982.
