= Bobos River (Guatemala) =

Location
- Country: Guatemala

Physical characteristics
- Source
  - location: Sierra de Caral
  - coordinates: 15.34263°N 88.71370°W
  - elevation: 600 m (2,000 ft)
- Mouth
  - location: Tributary of the Motagua River
  - coordinates: 15.41943°N 88.81768°W
  - elevation: 60 m (200 ft)
- Basin size: Gulf of Honduras

The Bobos River is a river in Guatemala. It rises in the Sierra de Caral, a small mountain range in the eastern department of Izabal, and runs a north-westerly course to join the Motagua River.

The Río Bobos Hydroelectric Dam spans the river about 16.5 kilometres (10.3 mi) south-east of Morales.
