= Guatemala Department =

Department of Guatemala

Guatemala Department Departmento de Guatemala
- Department
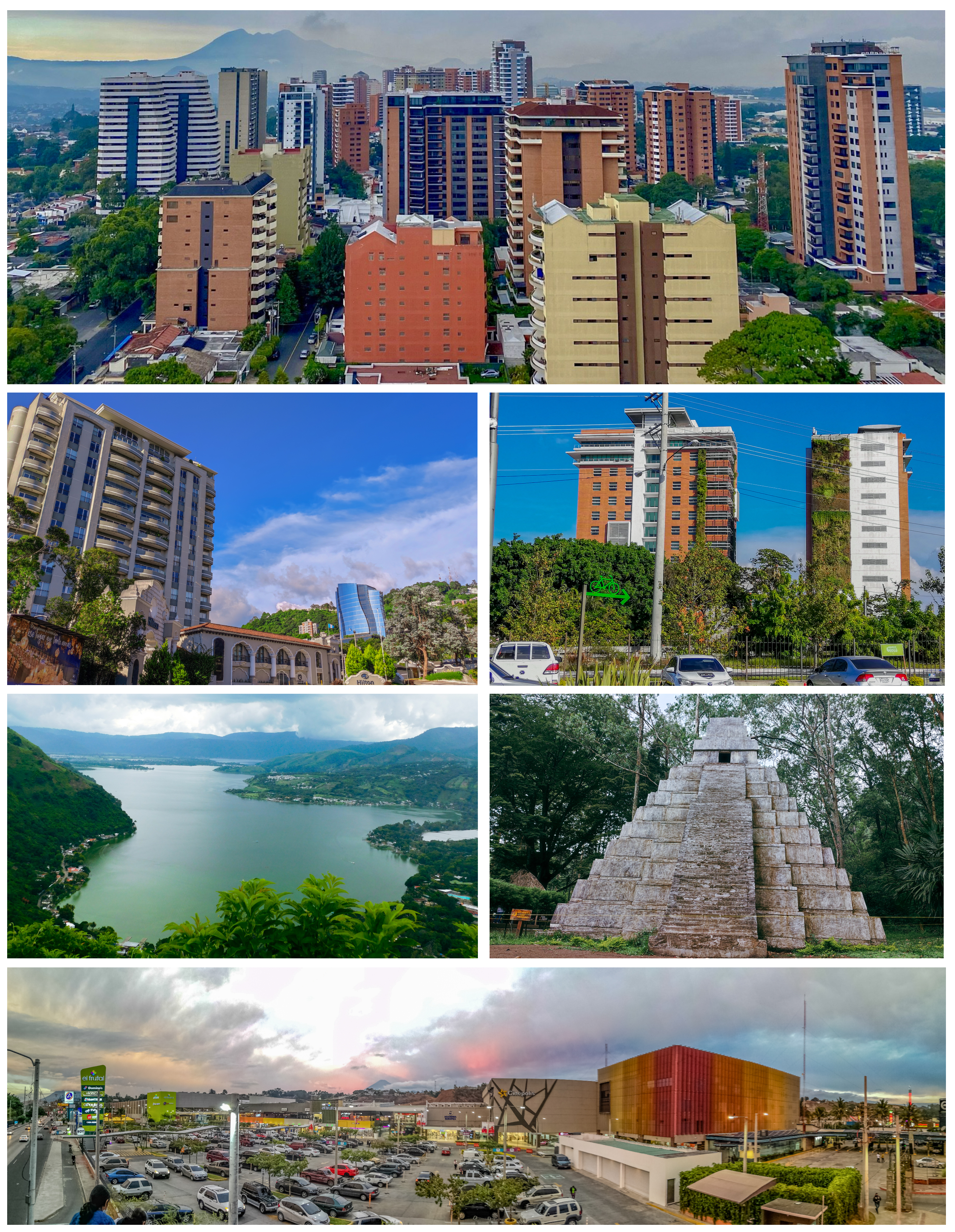
- Counterclockwise from top: Guatemala City, Santa Catarina Pinula, Mixco, Lago Amatitlan, Parque Nacional Naciones Unidas & Villa Nueva.

- Flag Coat of arms

- Coordinates: 14°38′29″N 90°30′47″W
- Country: Guatemala
- Capital: Guatemala City
- Municipalities: 17

Government
  - Type: Departmental

Area
  - Department: 2,126 km^{2} (821 sq mi)

Population (2018)
  - Department: 3,015,081
  - Rank: 1st
  - Density: 1,418/km^{2} (3,673/sq mi)
  - Urban: 2,750,965
  - Religions: Roman Catholicism Evangelicalism Maya
- Time zone: UTC−6
- ISO 3166 code: GT-01

Guatemala Department is one of the 22 departments of Guatemala. The capital is Guatemala City, which also serves as the national capital. The department consists of Guatemala City, its suburbs and other municipalities.

The department covers a surface area of 2,126 square kilometres (821 sq mi), and had a population of 3,015,081 at the 2018 census.

== Municipalities ==
1. Amatitlán
2. Chinautla
3. Chuarrancho
4. Fraijanes
5. Guatemala City
6. Mixco
7. Palencia
8. San José del Golfo
9. San José Pinula
10. San Juan Sacatepéquez
11. San Miguel Petapa
12. San Pedro Ayampuc
13. San Pedro Sacatepéquez
14. San Raymundo
15. Santa Catarina Pinula
16. Villa Canales
17. Villa Nueva
