= La Laguna (disambiguation) =

La Laguna may also refer to:

== Places ==
- La Laguna, Arizona
- La Laguna, Chalatenango
- La Laguna (Los Llanos de Aridane), La Palma, Canary Islands
- La Laguna (Mexibús), a BRT station in Coacalco, Mexico
- La Laguna, Panama
- La Laguna, Veraguas, Panama
- Laguna, Philippines, formerly known as La Laguna
- Comarca Lagunera, in Mexico
- Pajares de la Laguna
- San Cristóbal de La Laguna, a.k.a. La Laguna
- San Juan La Laguna
- San Marcos La Laguna
- San Pablo La Laguna
- San Pedro La Laguna
- Santa Clara La Laguna
- Santa Cruz La Laguna

== Other ==
- Tomás de la Cerda, 3rd Marquis of la Laguna (1638–1692)
- Sancho de la Cerda, 1st Marquis of la Laguna (1550–1626), Spanish nobleman and diplomat
- Arroyo de la Laguna
- Rancho La Laguna
- Roman Catholic Diocese of San Cristóbal de La Laguna
- Sierra de la Laguna dry forests
- Sierra de la Laguna pine-oak forests
- Sierra de la Laguna
- University of La Laguna, oldest university in the Canary Islands
- Battle of San Cristóbal de La Laguna

== See also ==
- Laguna (disambiguation)
