= Concepción Ramírez =

Guatemalan indigenous woman (1942–2021)

- Born: María de la Concepción Ramírez Mendoza; 8 March 1942; Santiago Atitlán, Sololá, Guatemala
- Died: 10 September 2021 (aged 79); Santiago Atitlán, Sololá, Guatemala
- Known for: Portrait on the 25 centavo coin; peace activism
- Awards: Orden Municipal del Reino Tz'utujil

María de la Concepción Ramírez Mendoza (8 March 1942 – 10 September 2021) was a peace activist from Guatemala, whose portrait appears on the Guatemalan 25 centavo coin, known as the choca.

== Biography ==
Ramírez was born on 8 March 1942 in Santiago Atitlán, a town in the department of Sololá. Her father was an evangelical preacher and her mother taught her traditional crafts at home. In 1965 she married Miguel Ángel Reanda Sicay and they went on to have six children.

=== 25 centavo ===
In 1959, at the age of 17, her portrait was chosen to feature on the 25-centavo coin as a result of a competition to find the 'prettiest indigenous woman' in Guatemala. The portrait was prepared from photographs by the artist Alfredo Gálvez Suárez. People refer to her portrait as the "woman of the choca" and is recognised by people across the country.

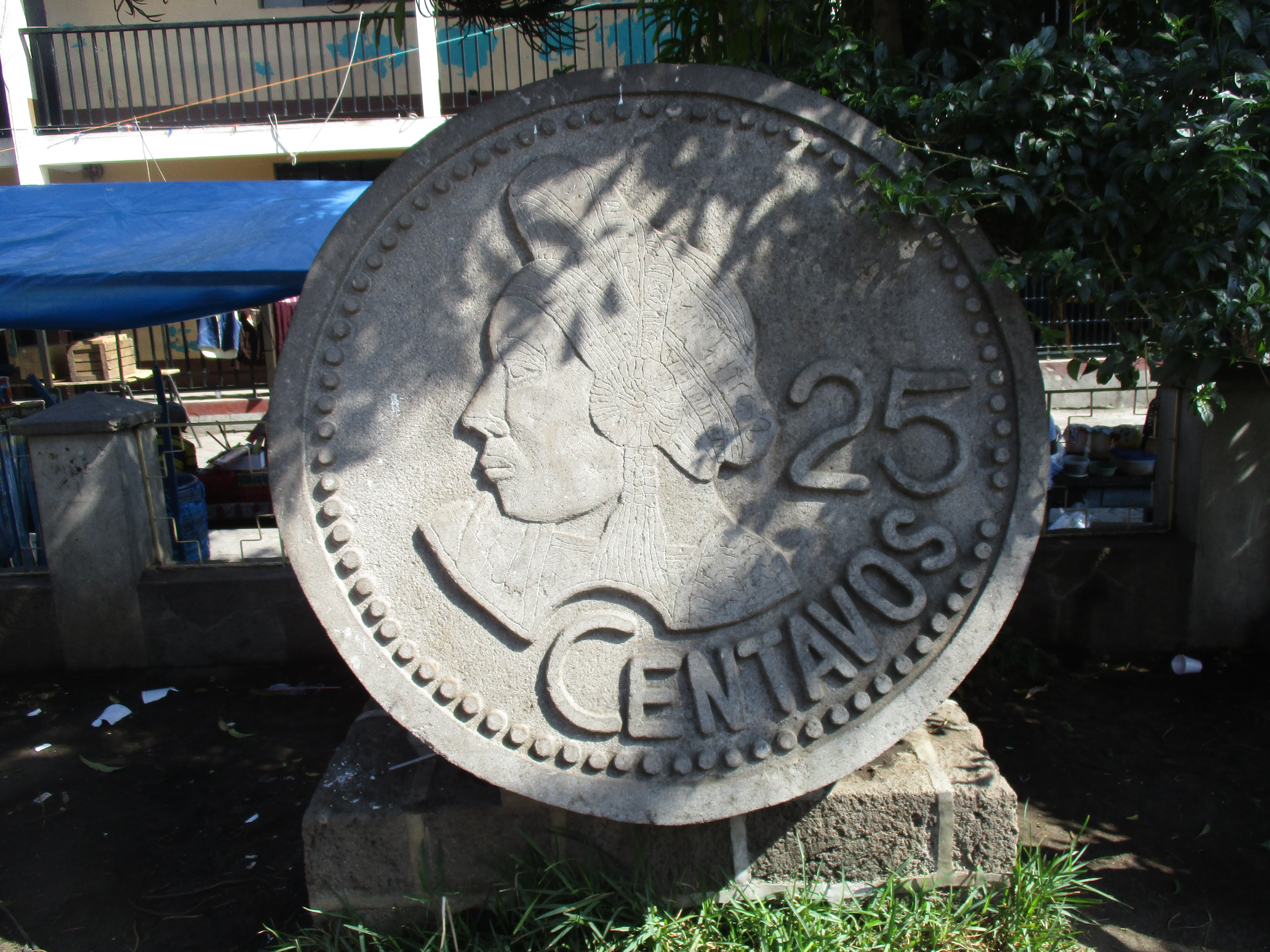
Sculpture of the 25-centavo coin Ramírez features on in Plaza Concepción, Santiago Atitlán

Ramírez was a spokesperson for Tz'utujil culture and was passionate about keeping its traditions and language alive. In 2019, the park in Santiago Atitlán was remodelled to include a monument to her shaped like a 1m choco.

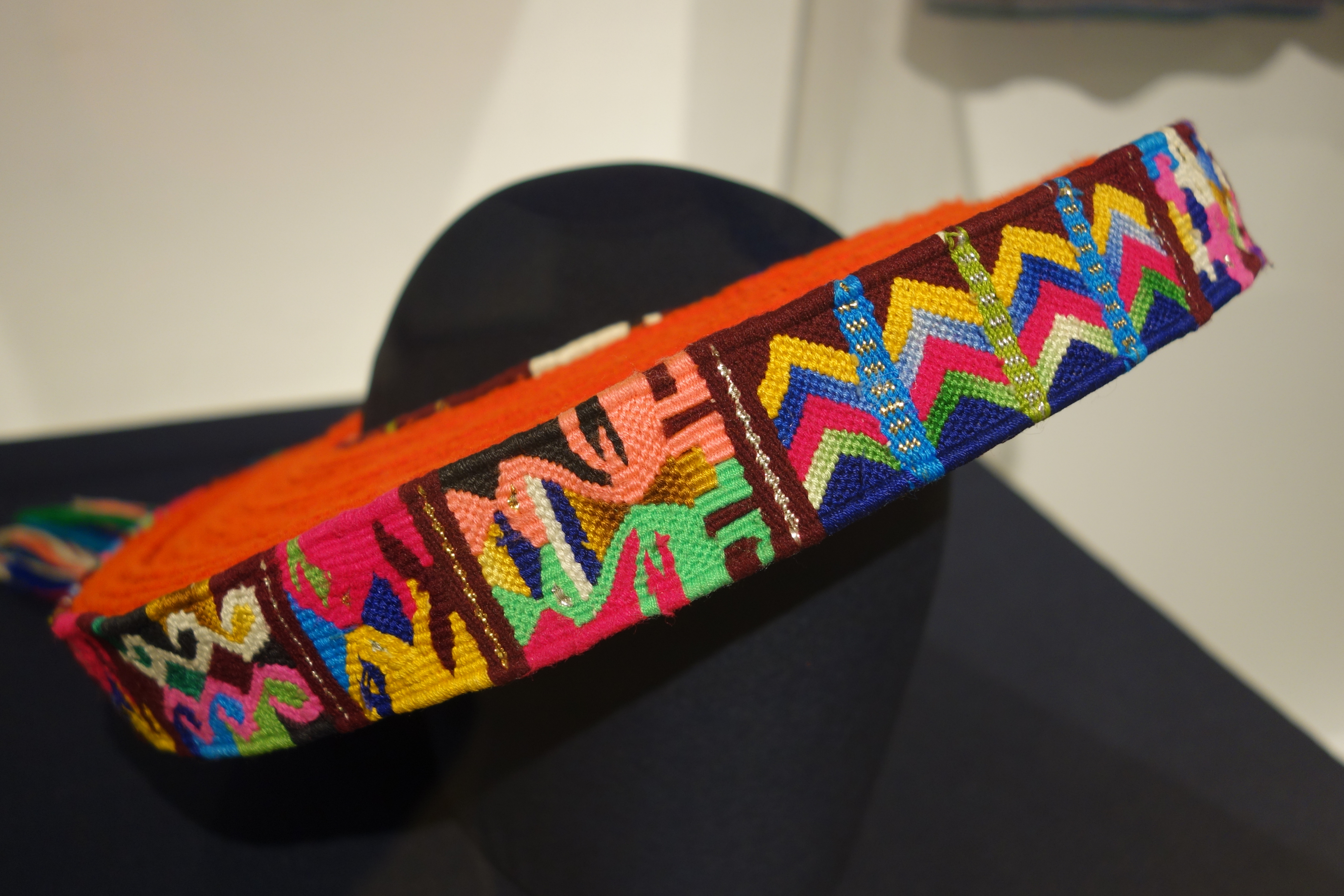
Tocoyal (hair ribbon/head dress), Tz'utujil Maya, Santiago Atitlán, c. 1920, cotton - Textile Museum of Canada

The coin's design features Ramírez wearing a tocoyal head-dress, which is shaped like Lake Atitlán, and made of fabric wound around the head twenty times. Plaza Concepción in the town was named after her.

In 2018, Ramírez was awarded a pension by the state, as recognition for her life's achievements.

=== Activism ===
Guatemala has a violent political past, and her family was affected by it: on 7 January 1980, her father was tortured to death with 27 other people. On 22 May 1990, her husband was murdered with three other people in a wave of political violence. In reaction to this, Ramírez spoke out against political violence; and in 2007, she had the honor of laying a white rose in Palm of Peace at the National Palace of Culture, and in the delivery of a document related to the internal armed conflict.

On 8 March 2016, the General Sub-Directorate for Crime Prevention of the National Civil Police in Santiago Atitlán paid tribute to her on her 74th birthday.

== Awards ==
- Municipal Order of the Tzutujil Kingdom (2019)
