= San Juan La Laguna =

San Juan La Laguna Xe' Kuku' Juyu'
- Municipality and town
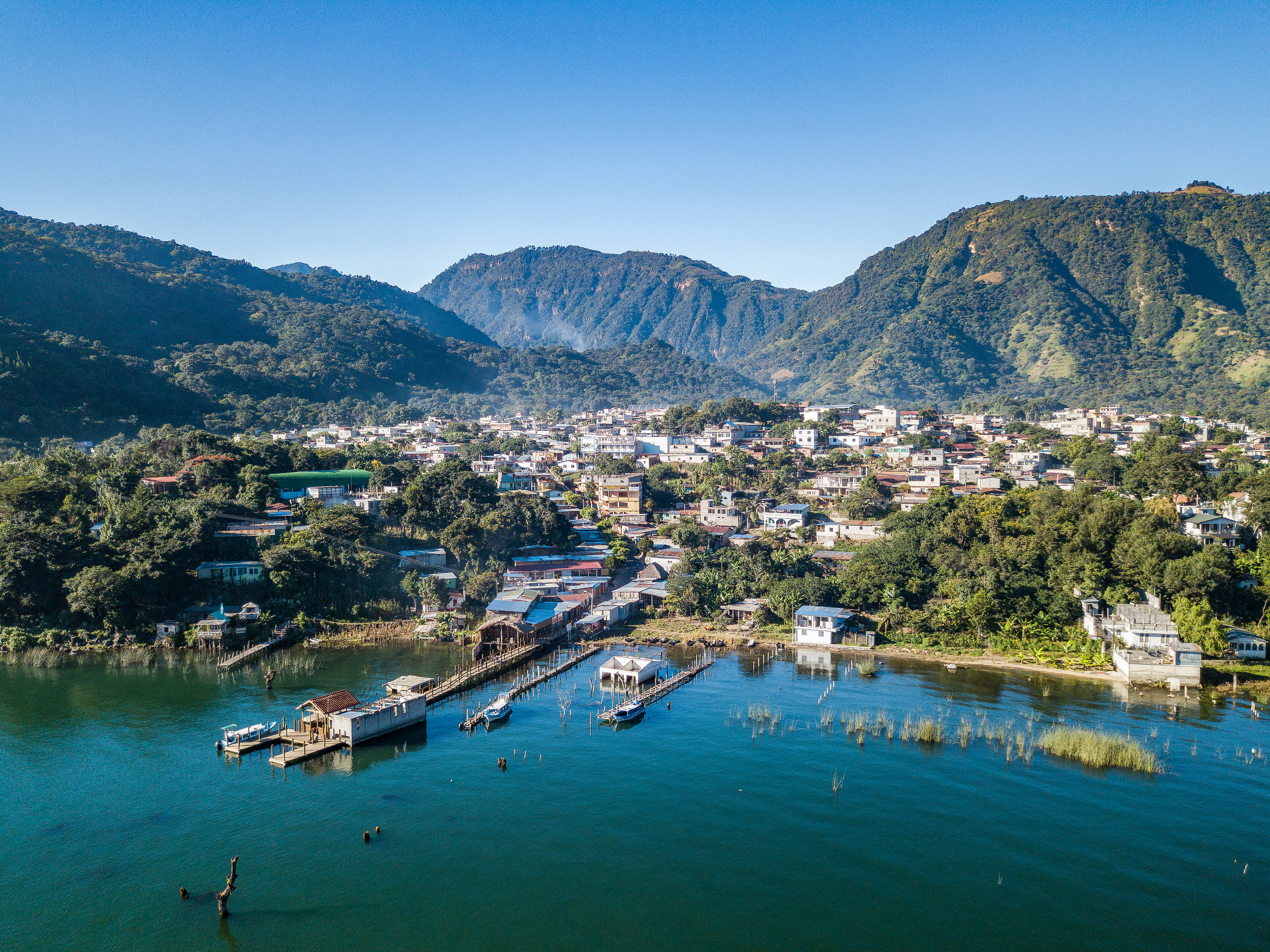
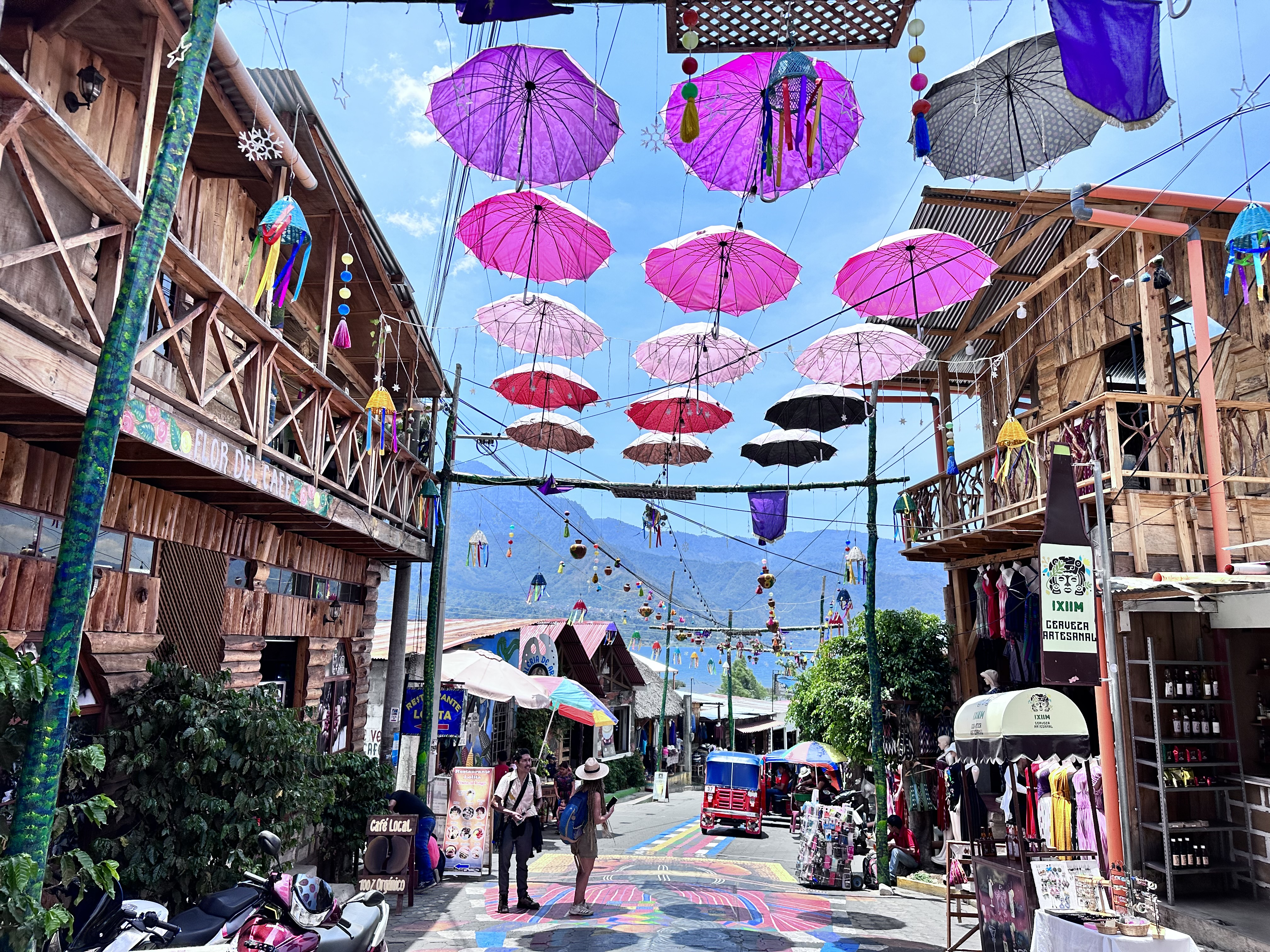
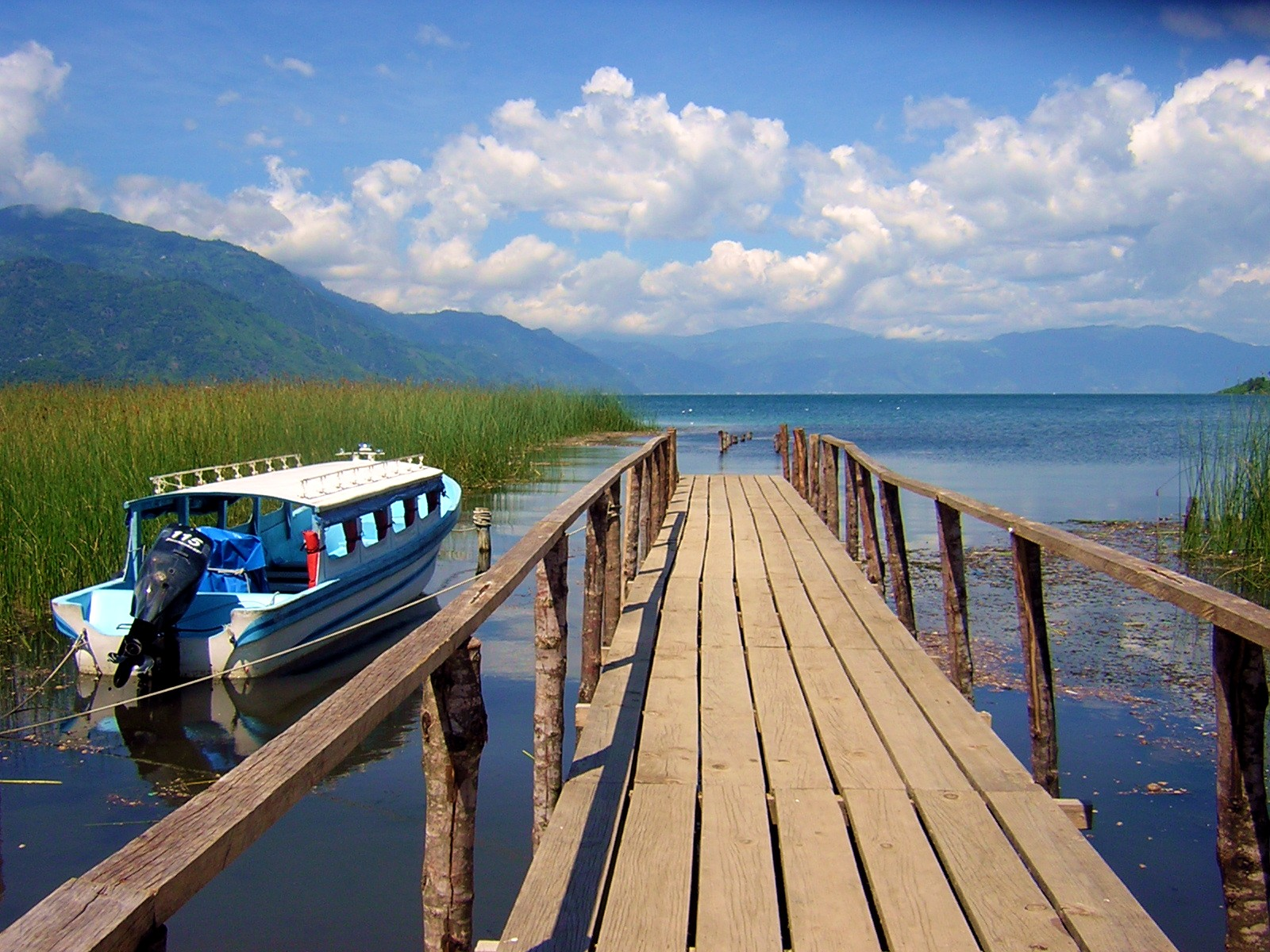
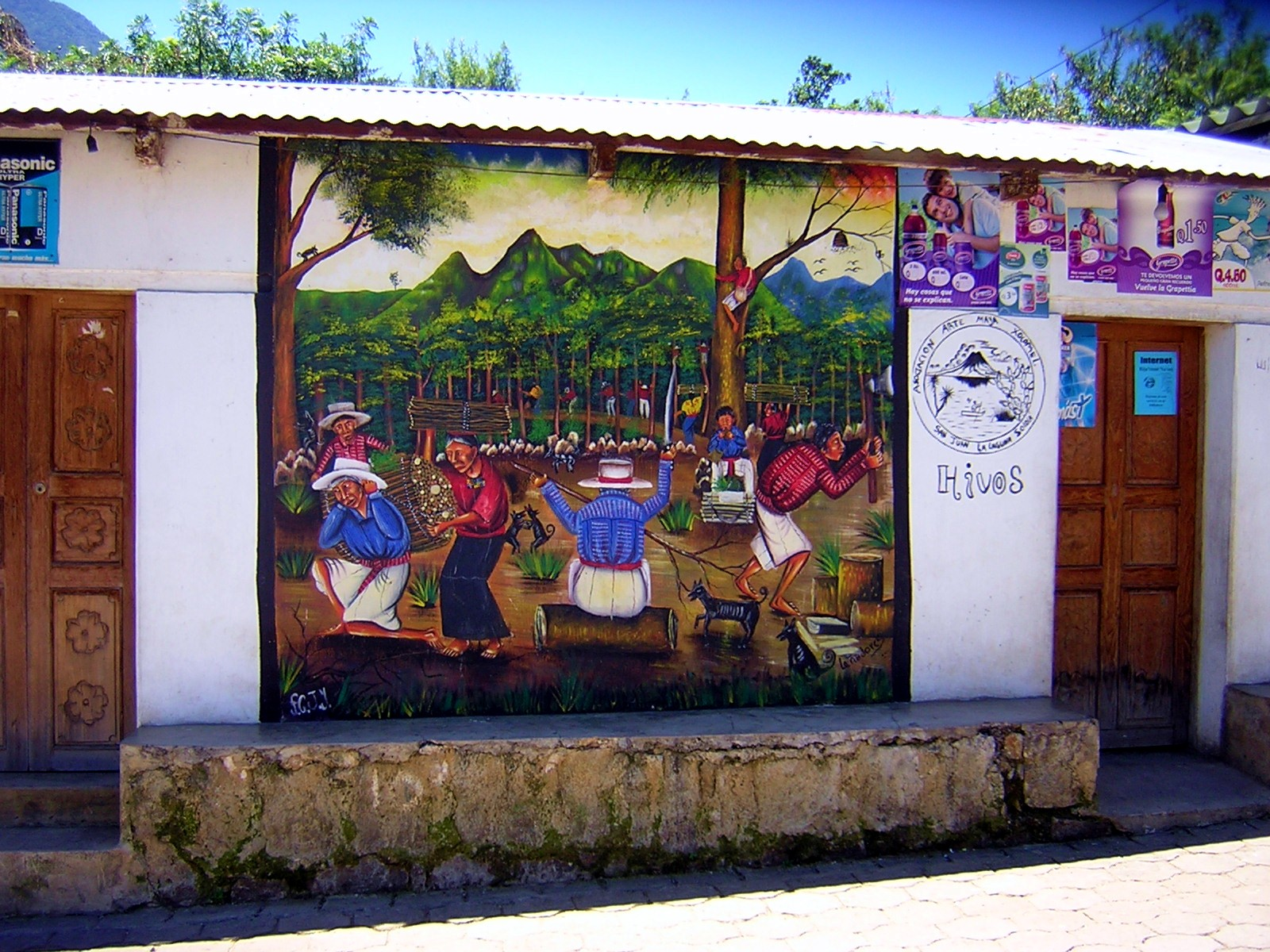
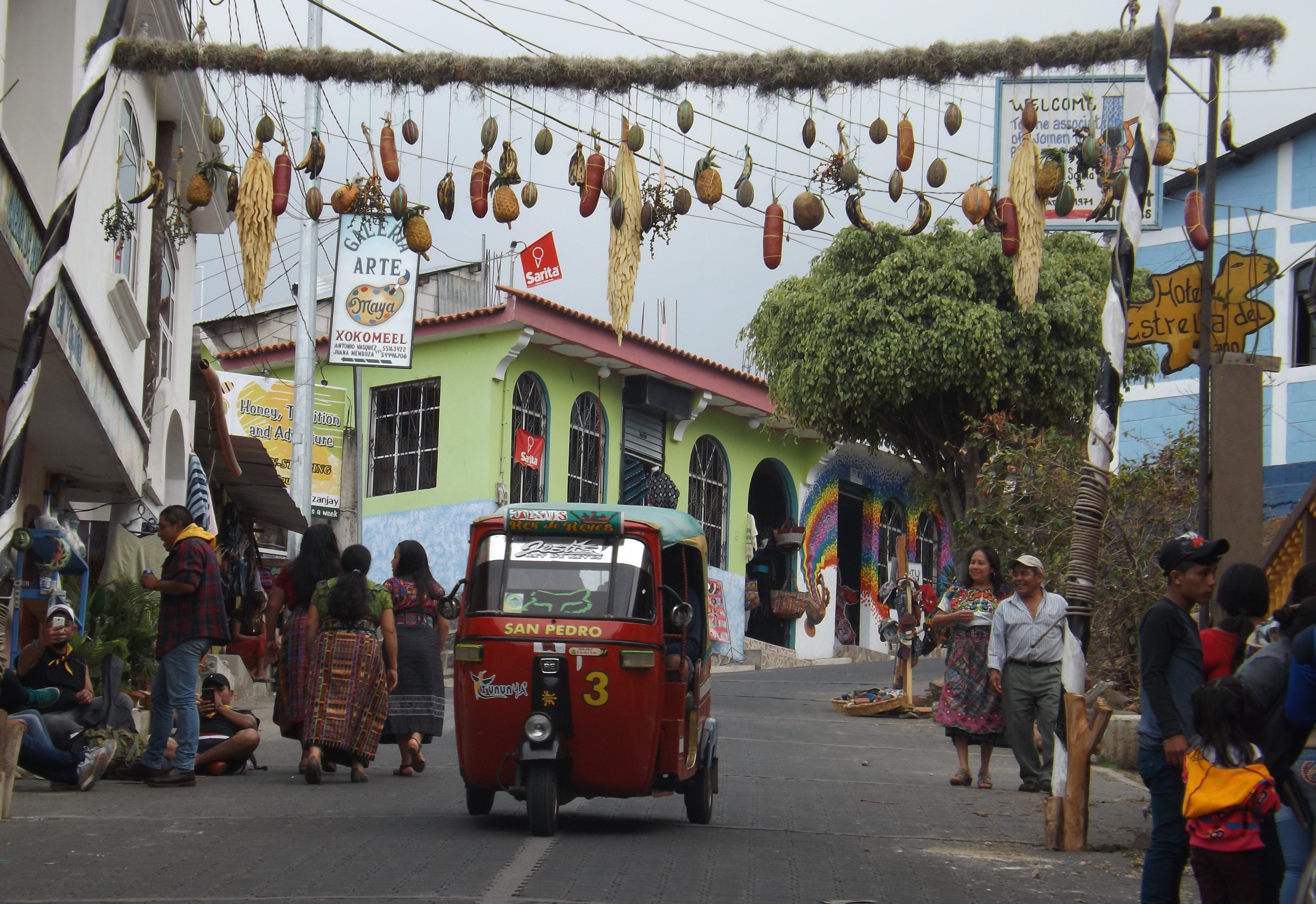
- From top, left to right: Panoramic view of San Juan la Laguna • Typical streets of San Juan la Laguna • Pier in San Juan la Laguna • Painting of Firewood in San Juan la Laguna • Another part of the streets in San Juan la Laguna

- location in Guatemala
- Coordinates: 14°42′N 91°17′W
- Country: Guatemala
- Department: Sololá

Government
  - Type: municipal
  - Mayor: Antonio Chavajay Ixtamer

Area
  - Total: 3,718 km^{2} (1,436 sq mi)
- Lowest elevation: 1,562 m (5,125 ft)

Population (2021)
  - Total: 13,400
  - Density: 27,372/km^{2} (70,890/sq mi)
- Time zone: UTC-6 (Central Time)
- Postal code: 07017
- Country calling code: 502
- Climate: Aw

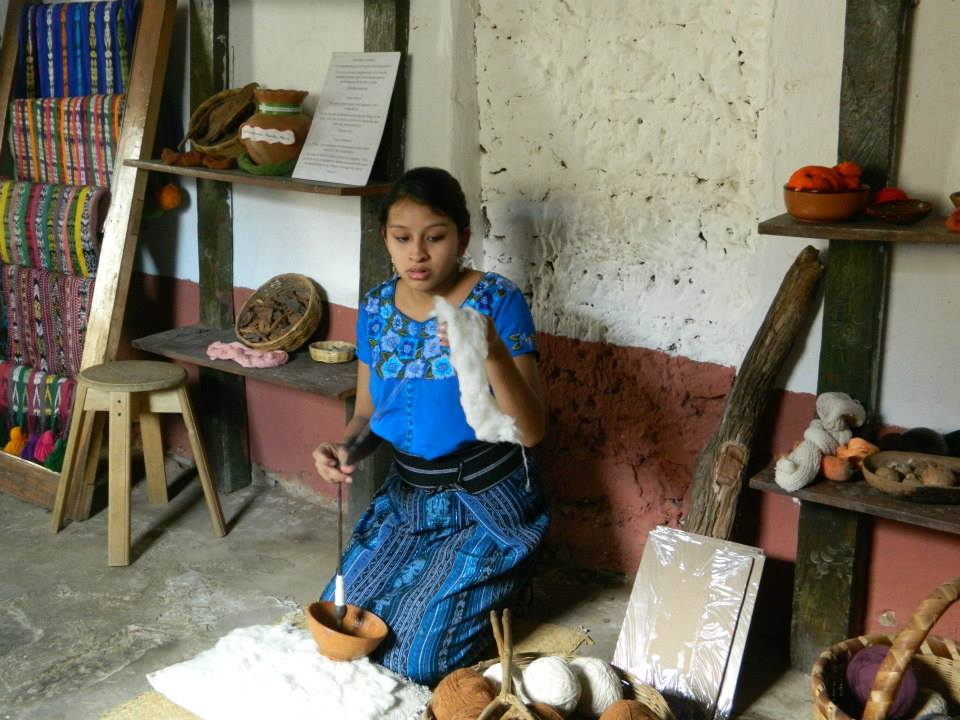
Tz'utujil women demonstrates traditional weaving techniques

San Juan La Laguna (Spanish pronunciation: [saŋ ˈxwan la laˈɣuna]) is a municipality on the southwest shore of Lago de Atitlán, Sololá, Guatemala. It consists of the village named San Juan La Laguna and three smaller aldeas (small villages) in the nearby mountain. The population is approximately 95% Tz'utujil. Agriculture is most important for the economy, with the service sector growing, especially as the number of tourists increase. The lowest elevation is the shore of Lago Atitlán at 1,562 metres (5,125 ft).

The town is notably less popular among tourists and expats, as a local law prohibits outsiders from purchasing land within the municipality. Due to this, visitors to the town can enjoy a more "authentic" experience among the indigenous Tz'utujil population.

== Local economy ==
San Juan La Laguna is similar to other towns along the lake, in that its population has traditionally subsisted off of the income from the fishing and agriculture industries. Before tourism came to the town around a decade ago, the women would be forced to climb the surrounding mountains to sell their textiles to other communities. Now, San Juan is home to Trama Textiles, a women's weaving co-op consisting of just over a dozen women who make textiles using the traditional Mayan art of backstrap loom weaving.

As of 2020, they have partners all over the world who sell their good wholesale, casting a wide net for their products and profit. In addition to backstrap weaving, local female-led cooperatives have revived traditional ethnobotanical dyeing techniques, utilizing native plants, bark, and minerals to produce organic colorants that distinguish San Juan's textile production within the regional artisan economy.

The fishing industry has taken a hit in recent years, with the lake's fish population steadily declining. This is in part due to the introduction of the non-native Black Bass 1958 in an attempt to attract more recreational fishing tourism. It has since caused disruption of the lake's natural ecosystem, causing the extinction of local bird and fish species. Most fishermen are still able to make a living by taking tourists out in their traditional boats, but worry about the future. The main crops of the area include avocado, coffee, cacao, and corn, though the town is notably lacking in land due to the expropriation of it by the government in response to the global coffee trade boom in the mid-20th century.

== Ethnic history ==
San Juan La Laguna is populated by an ethnic group called the Tz'utujil, one of 21 Maya ethnic groups. The Tz'utujil speak a language of the same name, Tz'utuijil, and share the coast of Lake Atitlán with another Maya ethnic group, the Kaqchikel. According to the Popol Vuh, the Título de Sacapulas, and other sixteenth-century Chronicles, the lords of the Tz'ikinjay or "Bird-House" nation or Amaq' who founded the Tz'utujil state did not come to the region until the Late Postclassic period. At least two Kaqchikel chronicles from that, the Annals of the Cakchiquels and one of the Títulos Xpantzay and at least one K'ichee' chronicle, the Tz'utujils led by the Tz'ikinjay controlled of the entire lake until the mid-fifteenth century, when they were defeated by the Kaqchikels, while the Kaqchikels were still soldier-subalterns subject to the K'ichee' state. According to the Kaqchikel documents, the Kaqchikels were able to conquer some of the Tz'utujil territory and divided the lake and towns in half with the Tz'utujils. The K'ichee' document, on the other hand, claims that the K'ichee' took half the lake.

In Pre-Columbian times, the Tz'utujil nation's capital was a town near Santiago Atitlán known both as Chiya' ("At the Water") and by the name of the ruling chinamit, "Tzikinjaay," which was conquered in 1523 by the Spanish conquistador, Pedro de Alvarado, with the help of the nearby Kaqchikel.[7] The site of the ruins of the old capital, located atop a lake-front hill at the base of Volcán San Pedro, just west of Santiago Atitlán across a narrow inlet, has been known for centuries as Chuitinamit, "the walled-town above."

== Local Dialects ==
Foreign linguists since at least Jon P. Dayley have tended to study and promote the "linguistically conservative" Tz'utujil dialect of San Juan La Laguna, especially when compared to the "phonological innovation" of the Atiteco dialect, which tends to diphthongize vowels, while every other municipal dialect retains a more original K'iche'an system of 5 long and 5 short vowels. It is noteworthy that the original Proyecto Lingüístico Francisco Marroquín team that worked to document Tzutujil in the 1970s included at least two native-speakers from San Juan, alongside at least two from Santiago Atitlán. And while the main offices of the Tz'utujil linguistic community for the Academia de Lenguas Mayas de Guatemala are located in San Pedro La Laguna, the ALMG-Tz'utujil used to promote the syllable-internal pre-consonantal velar fricative /-j/ (corresponding to [X] in the alphabet of the International Phonetic Alphabet), most common in San Juan La Laguna and the adjacent townships of Santa María Visitación, San Pablo La Laguna, and to a lesser extent, San Pedro La Laguna, as a critically distinctive characteristic of Tz'utujil, which had later been lost in Santiago and among young people in San Pedro.

Despite these facts, residents of Santiago Atitlán, who make about half of the total population of Tz'utujils, sometimes claim to be the only ones who speak the pure form of the language, which they refer to as "qtz'oj'bal" or "our language." They claim that the townspeople of San Pedro La Laguna speak a dialect of Tz'utujil called "Pedrano," while the inhabitants of San Juan La Laguna speak "Juanero." [8]

While Tz'utujil is the primary indigenous language of San Juan Laguna, and that language is still spoken as a first language by a majority of the residents of the township's lakeside cabecera or head-town, a notable portion of the population of the township's three main villages, Palestina, Panyevar, and Pasajquim (Pa Saq K'iim), now speak K'ichee'. Located in the mountains west and southwest of the cabecera of San Juan, these three villages began being settled by K'ichee' colonists during the Colonial Period, while San Juan La Laguna was still known as "San Juan Atitlan." The Testamento Ajpopoljay, the only colonial titulo written in the Tz'utujil language known to have survived to the twentieth century, was authored by a Juanero named Jerónimo Mendosa in 1569 and was later presented by his descendants to the Spanish colonial government as part of San Juan's land titles in 1640, during a dispute over land invasions by K'iche' people from Santa Clara La Laguna and Santa Catarina Ixtahuacan. Given that the document has not been locatable by the Archivo General de Centroamérica since the late 1990s, it is presumed to have been stolen after the last known direct consultation with it by a scholar in the early 1990s. Although Guatemalan scholar Mario Crespo M. published an analysis of the document's contents based on a line-by-line preliminary translation of it sometime before 1968, it does not appear that he or anyone else transcribed the actual Tz'utujil text. Robert Carmack reportedly photocopied the document in the 1960s, but that copy has disappeared.

== Post-Civil War ==
The Guatemalan Civil War was fought between government forces and leftist rebels, the Revolutionary Organization of the People in Arms (ORPA) (Spanish: Organización Revolucionario del Pueblo en Armas). Spanning 36 years between 1960 and 1996, the war devastated the male population of Guatemala, leaving the women with few options to support themselves, their children, and the elderly. This is when the women's weaving cooperations of Guatemala sprouted into existence. San Juan hosts one such co-op, Trama Textiles, which employs just over a dozen women at any given time.
