= Concepción, Sololá =

Concepción
- Location in Guatemala
- Coordinates: 14°47′00″N 91°09′00″W
- Country: Guatemala
- Department: Sololá
- Municipality: Concepción

Government
  - Acting Mayor (2015-2016): Pedro Juracán Lopic (Note: Mayor Basilio Juracán -who served from 2008 to 2015- had been reelected for yet a third period in 2015, but he was lynched and murdered on 11 October 2015 after allegedly ordering a hit on a former competitor for the Mayoral office.)

Population (2018)
  - Total: 7,214
  - Religions: Roman Catholicism Evangelicalism Maya
- Climate: Cwb

Concepción (Spanish pronunciation: [konseβˈsjon]) is a municipality in the Sololá department of Guatemala. The outstanding characteristic of the municipality is that 100% of its inhabitants are native people.

== History ==
=== Spanish Colony ===
There is not any exact record of the exact foundation date of the town; it is known, however, that there was a time that it was called "Concepción Quechelaj" and "Concepción Paquixalá" according to several documents form the Spanish Colony era. The word "Quechelaj" is from the kakchikel language and means "River of thorns". After the Spanish conquest of Guatemala the town was called "Nuestra Señora de La Concepción" after the Our Lady of the Immaculate Conception. However, the town changed name several times after that.

During the Spanish Colony it was part of the Tecpán Atitlán district and when Tecpán became an "alcaldía mayor" (English:Major municipality) of Sololá Nuestra Señora de La Concepción became part of it, as reported in 1749. Documents from 1765 show its name as "Nuestra Señora de la Concepción Pajixolá". And in 1770, archbishop Pedro Cortés y Larraz described the town as "Concepción Kixalá, part of San Francisco Panajachel parish".

=== After Independence from Spain ===
According to a record from 1892, Concepción is reported as a municipality of Sololá Department.

=== 21st century ===
On 11 October 2015, a little over a month after the municipal elections for the 2016–20 mayoral term, an angry mob lynched and murdered re-elected Mayor Basilio Juracán, from the LIDER party, accusing him of allegedly ordering a hit against his former competitor for the mayor office from the Unidad Nacional de la Esperanza party —UNE—; the mob burned two vehicles and three houses, among those the one where the deceased mayor was hiding.

== Climate ==
Concepción has a temperate climate (Köppen: Cwb).

Climate data for Concepción
Month	Jan	Feb	Mar	Apr	May	Jun	Jul	Aug	Sep	Oct	Nov	Dec	Year
Mean daily maximum °C (°F)	20.8 (69.4)	21.5 (70.7)	22.9 (73.2)	23.6 (74.5)	23.2 (73.8)	21.4 (70.5)	21.9 (71.4)	22.4 (72.3)	21.7 (71.1)	21.5 (70.7)	21.4 (70.5)	20.8 (69.4)	21.9 (71.5)
Daily mean °C (°F)	14.5 (58.1)	14.8 (58.6)	16.2 (61.2)	17.3 (63.1)	17.9 (64.2)	17.0 (62.6)	17.1 (62.8)	17.0 (62.6)	16.8 (62.2)	16.6 (61.9)	15.6 (60.1)	14.6 (58.3)	16.3 (61.3)
Mean daily minimum °C (°F)	8.3 (46.9)	8.2 (46.8)	9.5 (49.1)	11.1 (52.0)	12.6 (54.7)	12.7 (54.9)	12.4 (54.3)	11.7 (53.1)	12.0 (53.6)	11.7 (53.1)	9.8 (49.6)	8.5 (47.3)	10.7 (51.3)
Average precipitation mm (inches)	0 (0)	3 (0.1)	5 (0.2)	22 (0.9)	76 (3.0)	273 (10.7)	205 (8.1)	208 (8.2)	339 (13.3)	152 (6.0)	42 (1.7)	2 (0.1)	1,327 (52.3)
Source: Climate-Data.org; Instituto Nacional de Sismología, Vulcanología, Meteorología e Hidrología de Guatemala

== Geographic location ==
The municipal capital is 6 km away from Sololá and 146 km away of Guatemala City.

== See also ==
- List of places in Guatemala

== Notes and references ==
=== Bibliography ===
- Cortés y Larraz, Pedro (1770). Descripción Geográfico-Moral de la Diócesis de Goathemala (in Spanish). Guatemala: Diócesis de Guatemala.
