= San Pablo La Laguna =

Municipality in the Solalá department, Guatemala

Coordinates: 14°43′N 91°16′W

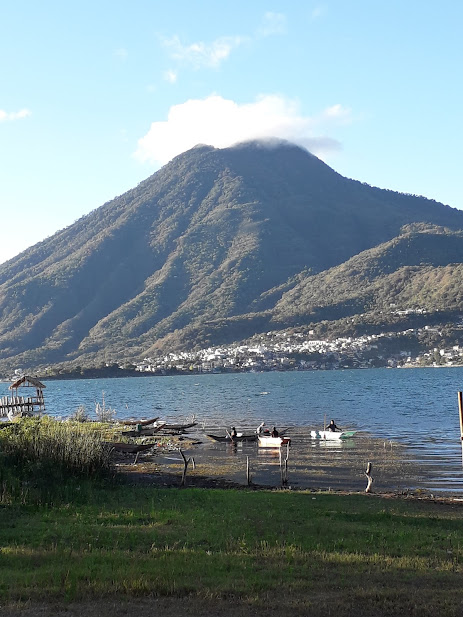
San Pablo La Laguna

San Pablo La Laguna (Spanish pronunciation: [sam ˈpaβlo la laˈɣuna]) is a municipality in the Sololá department of Guatemala. It consists of the village that bears the name San Pablo La Laguna which is situated on the shore of Lake Atitlan between the villages of San Juan La Laguna and San Marcos La Laguna.
