= San José Chacayá =

Coordinates: 14°46′N 91°13′W

San José Chacayá is a municipality in the Sololá department of Guatemala.
