= Santa Lucía Utatlán =

Coordinates: 14°46′N 91°16′W

Santa Lucía Utatlán (Spanish pronunciation: [ˈsanta luˈsi.awtaˈtlan]) is a municipality in the Sololá department of Guatemala.

== Climate ==
Santa Lucia Utatlan has a subtropical highland climate (Cwb) dry, cold winters and rainy, cool summers.

Climate data for Santa Lucia Utatlan
Month	Jan	Feb	Mar	Apr	May	Jun	Jul	Aug	Sep	Oct	Nov	Dec	Year
Mean daily maximum °C (°F)	17.6 (63.7)	18.5 (65.3)	19.9 (67.8)	20.9 (69.6)	20.2 (68.4)	18.9 (66.0)	18.7 (65.7)	19.2 (66.6)	18.7 (65.7)	18.1 (64.6)	18.3 (64.9)	17.8 (64.0)	18.9 (66.0)
Daily mean °C (°F)	10.5 (50.9)	11.2 (52.2)	12.5 (54.5)	14.1 (57.4)	14.9 (58.8)	14.4 (57.9)	14.0 (57.2)	13.8 (56.8)	14.1 (57.4)	13.4 (56.1)	12.2 (54.0)	11.3 (52.3)	13.0 (55.5)
Mean daily minimum °C (°F)	3.4 (38.1)	4.0 (39.2)	5.2 (41.4)	7.4 (45.3)	9.6 (49.3)	9.9 (49.8)	9.4 (48.9)	8.5 (47.3)	9.5 (49.1)	8.7 (47.7)	6.1 (43.0)	4.9 (40.8)	7.2 (45.0)
Average rainfall mm (inches)	3 (0.1)	4 (0.2)	5 (0.2)	33 (1.3)	141 (5.6)	203 (8.0)	159 (6.3)	194 (7.6)	295 (11.6)	130 (5.1)	19 (0.7)	2 (0.1)	1,188 (46.8)
Source: Climate-Data.org
