= Sololá Department =

Department of Guatemala

Sololá Department Departmento de Sololá
- Department of Guatemala
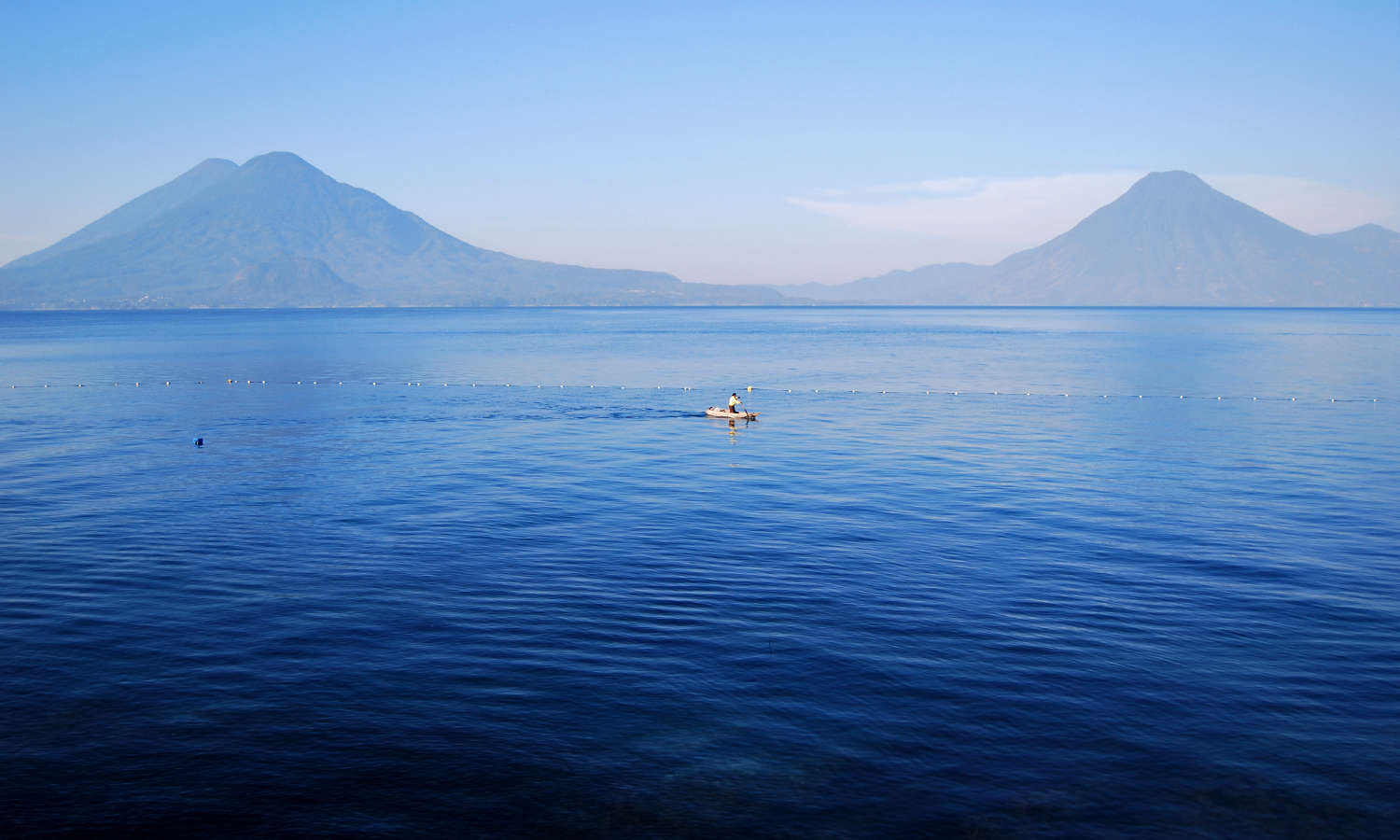
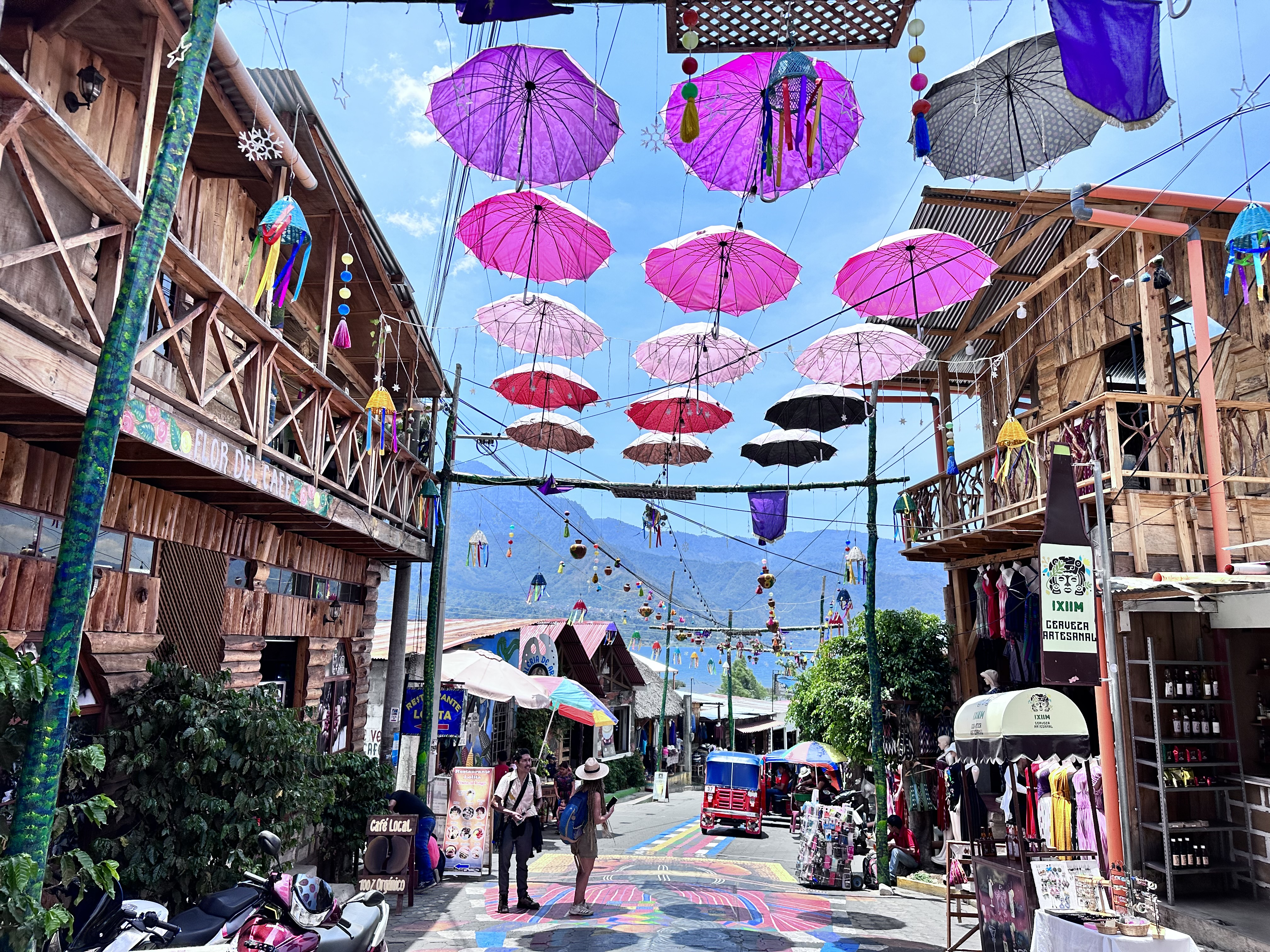
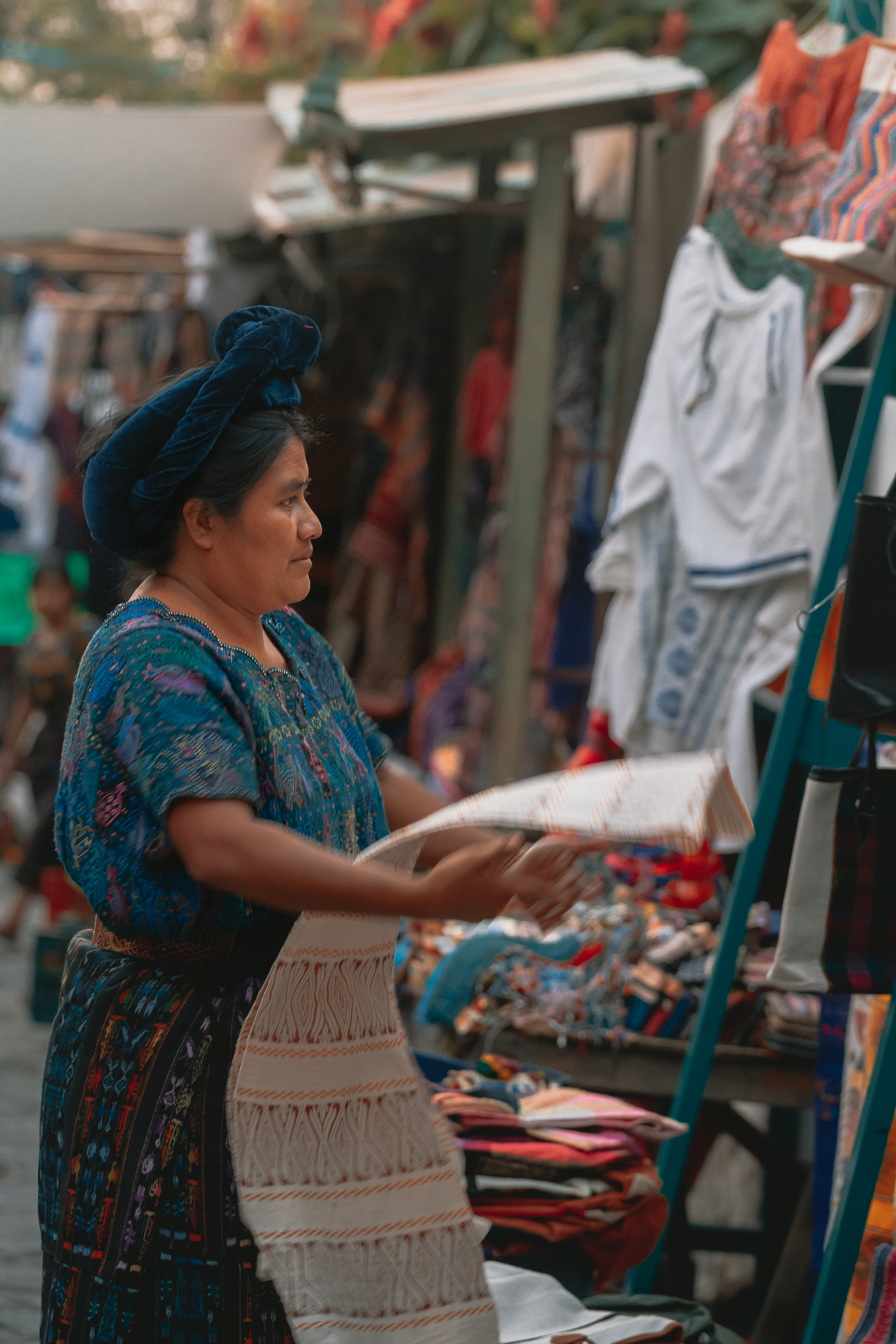
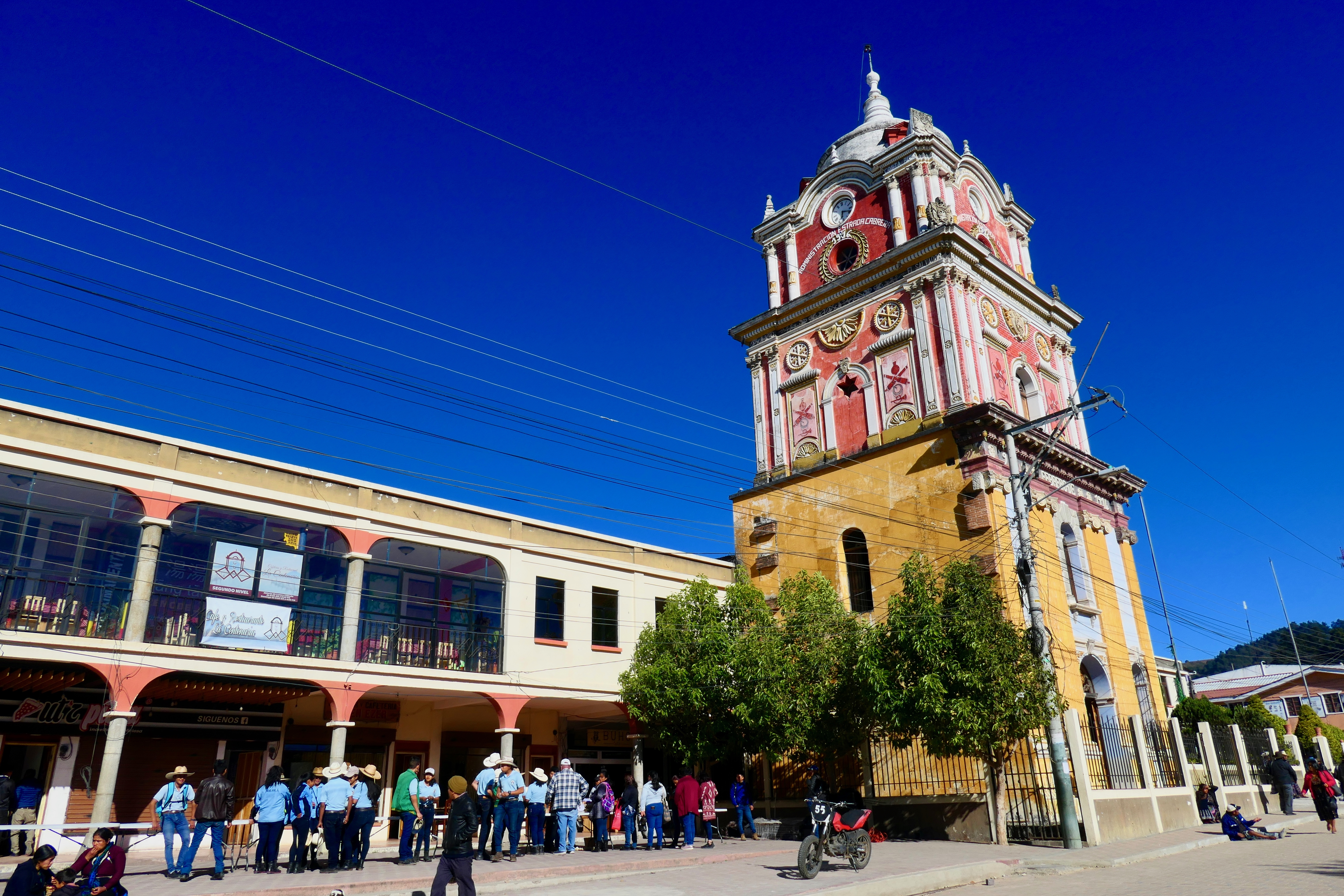
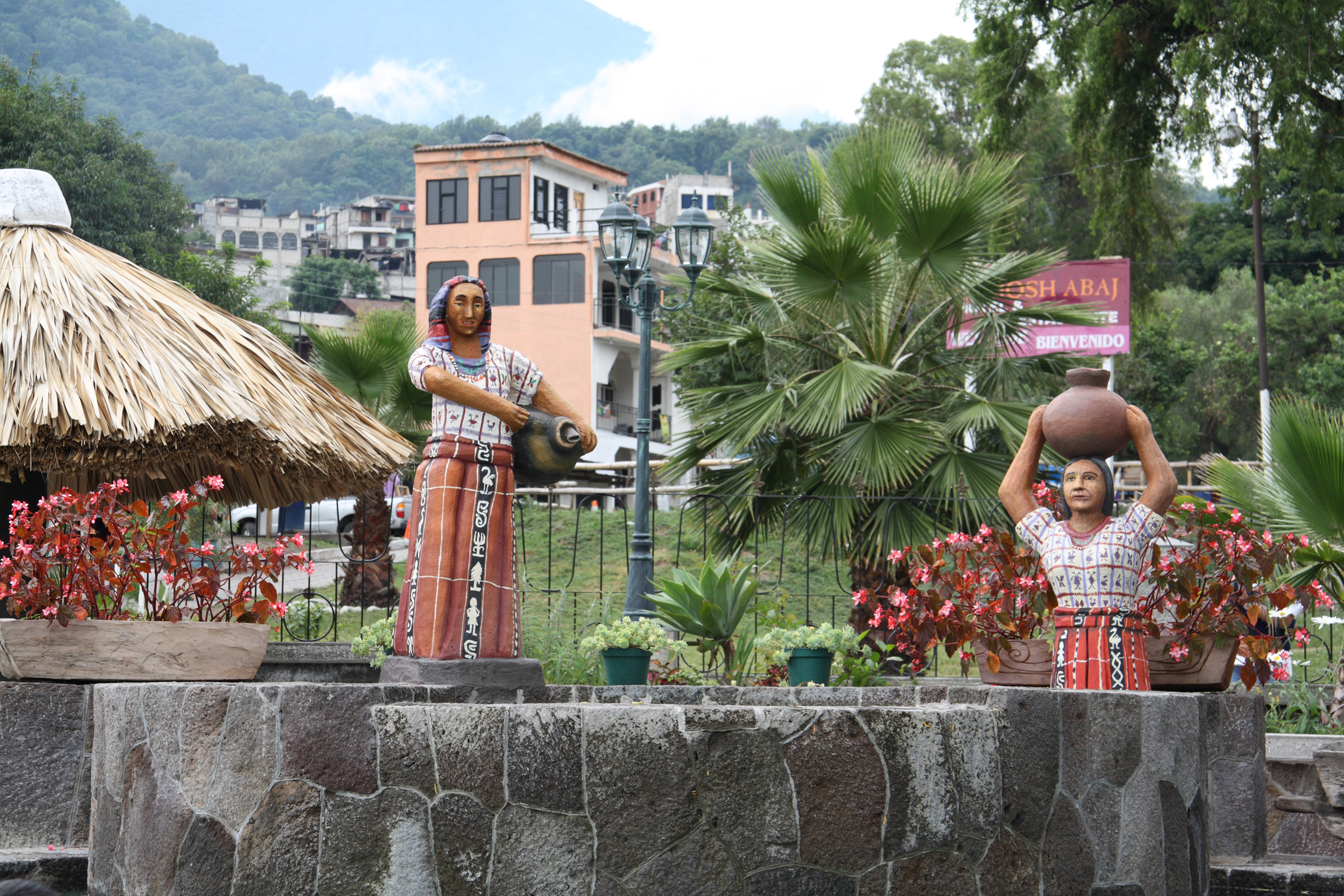
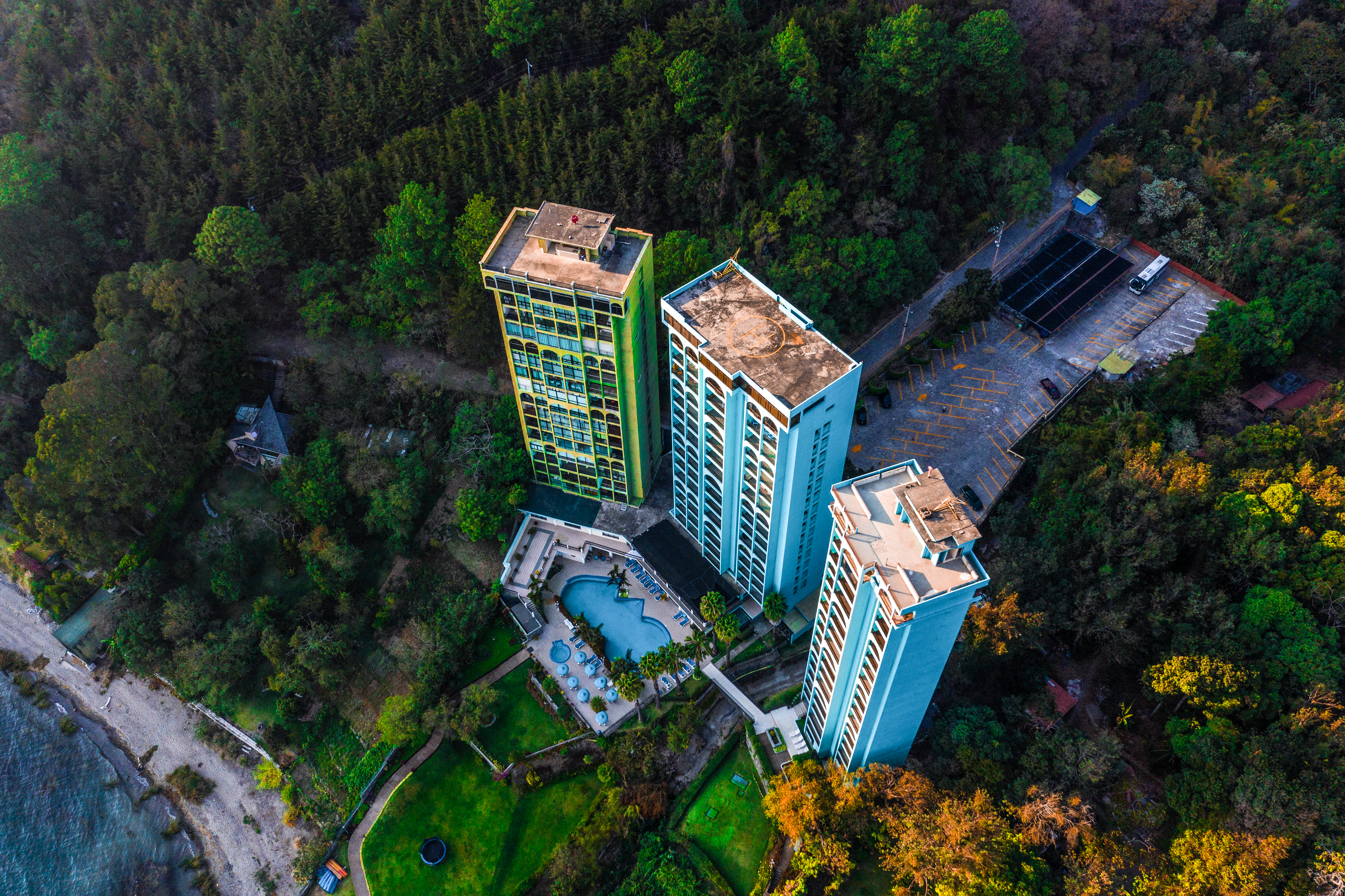
- Lake Atitlán San Juan La Laguna Santa Catarina Palopó Palace Sololá Santiago Atitlán The Riviera of Atitlán

- Flag Coat of arms

- Sololá
- Coordinates: 14°46′N 91°11′W
- Country: Guatemala
- Capital: Sololá
- Municipalities: 19

Government
  - Type: Departmental

Area
  - Department of Guatemala: 1,061 km^{2} (410 sq mi)

Population (2018)
  - Department of Guatemala: 421,583
  - Density: 397.3/km^{2} (1,029/sq mi)
  - Urban: 259,533
  - Ethnicities: K'akchiquel Tz'utujil K'iche Ladino
  - Religions: Roman Catholicism Evangelicalism Maya
- Time zone: UTC-6
- ISO 3166 code: GT-SO

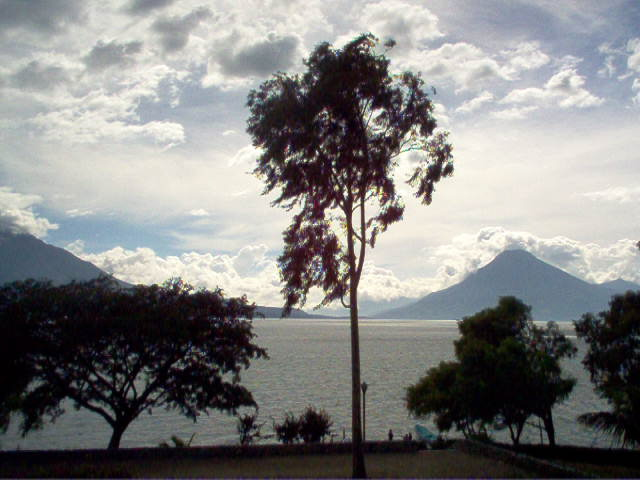
Lake Atitlán from Panajachel

Sololá is a department in the west of Guatemala. The capital is the city of Sololá. Lake Atitlan is a key feature surrounded by a number of the municipalities.

== Municipalities ==
1. Concepción
2. Nahualá
3. Panajachel
4. San Andrés Semetabaj
5. San Antonio Palopó
6. San José Chacayá
7. San Juan La Laguna
8. San Lucas Tolimán
9. San Marcos La Laguna
10. San Pablo La Laguna
11. San Pedro La Laguna
12. Santa Catarina Ixtahuacan
13. Santa Catarina Palopó
14. Santa Clara La Laguna
15. Santa Cruz La Laguna
16. Santa Lucía Utatlán
17. Santa María Visitación
18. Santiago Atitlán
19. Sololá

== Population ==
As of 2018, the department had a population of 421,583. The area is populated almost entirely by different Mayan ethnic groups, of which the two largest groups are the Kaqchikel people and K'iche'. Kaqchikel people accounted for 50.1% of the department's population, and K'iche' accounted for 35.3%. Indigenous people in total account for 96.5% of the department's population.

== Economy ==
With fertile soil, Sololá farmers produce maize, wheat, barley, vegetables, and fruit. Fruits include apples, cherries, cherimoya, peaches, and pears. Livestock is also common, including sheep. Since 1850, the region has had a large wool industry.

== Ecology ==
The area is mountainous. In 1850, the British described it as having a "healthy" climate "rather inclining to cold, or...temperate." Temperatures warm further south. Lago de Atitlán is located in Sololá.

== Sports ==
Saprissa de Guatemala is Solola's main football team and the most famous club in the department.

== Geography ==
Sololá has an area of 1,061 km²
