= San Pedro La Laguna =

San Pedro La Laguna Tz'unun Ya' (Tzʼutujil)
- Municipality
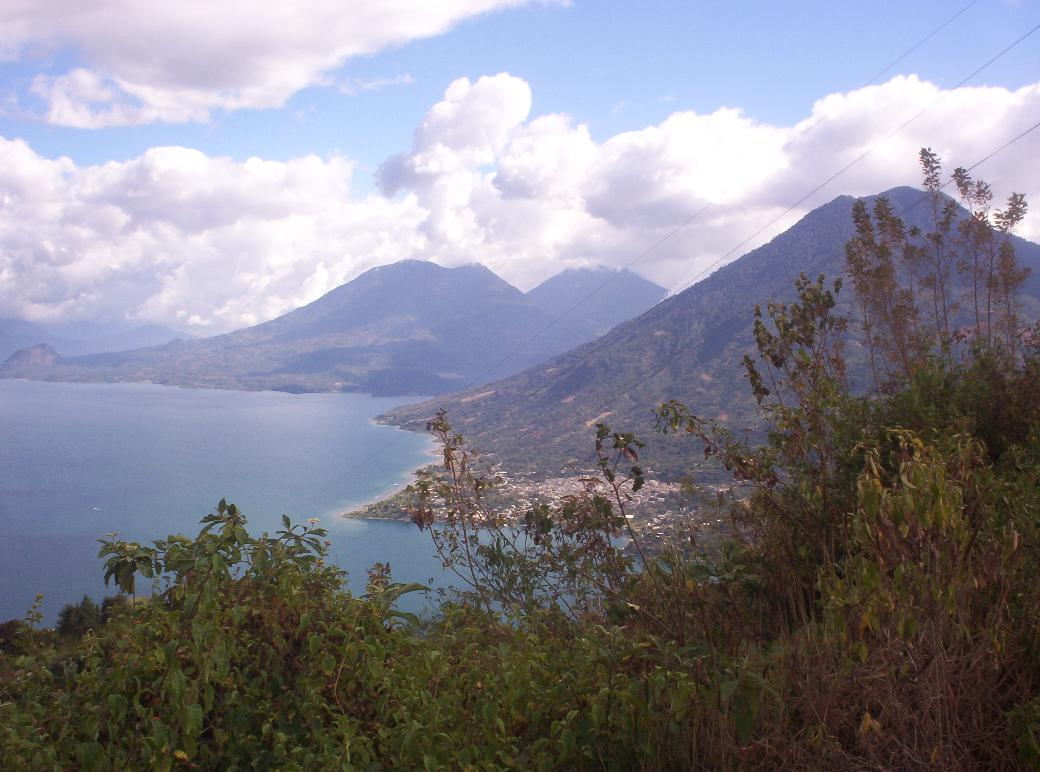
- View of San Pedro

- Location in Guatemala
- Coordinates: 14°41′38″N 91°16′19″W
- Country: Guatemala
- Department: Sololá
- Municipality: San Pedro La Laguna

Government
  - Type: Municipal
- Elevation: 1,610 m (5,280 ft)

Population (2021)
  - Total: 11,828
  - Ethnicities: Tz'utujil Ladino
  - Religions: Roman Catholicism Evangelicalism Maya
- Demonym: Pedrano
- Climate: Aw

San Pedro La Laguna (Spanish pronunciation: [sam ˈpeðɾo la laˈɣuna]) is a Guatemalan town on the southwest shore of Lake Atitlán. For centuries, San Pedro La Laguna has been inhabited by the Tz'utujil people, and in recent years it has also become a tourist destination for its Spanish language schools, nightlife, and proximity to the lake and volcanoes, particularly Volcán San Pedro, at whose base San Pedro La Laguna is located.

Local crops include corn, beans, coffee, and avocado. Some women make belts, shawls, and skirts with a back strap loom. San Pedro graduates large numbers of teachers who work the Atitlán area.

== Geography ==
San Pedro La Laguna is located on the southwestern shore of Lago de Atitlán. The town is located beneath Volcan San Pedro. This volcano towers over the lake at 9,905 feet and is an attraction for climbers and hikers. The town of San Pedro La Laguna sits on a plateau and has roads running down either side of a steep ridge towards docks on the lakeshore. The dock on the west side of the plateau is called muelle municipal and has boats arriving from and departing to the town of Panajachel. The east side has a dock named muelle santiago which has boats arriving from and departing to Santiago Atitlan. The east side is also home to la playa (the beach) where people enjoy snorkeling, canoeing, and kayaking.

San Pedro La Laguna can be reached by regular boats across Lake Atitlán from Panajachel (45 min) and Santiago Atitlán (30 min), or by direct bus from Guatemala City (4 hrs), Xela (3 hrs), and Mazatenango. The town is located one hour off the Interamericana Highway (CA-1) at km 148. Buses for San Pedro depart hourly from zone 8, near the Trébol interchange, alongside Calzada Roosvelt in Guatemala City or, in Xela, from the main bus terminal in zone 3.

== Demography ==
San Pedro La Laguna is a small town with a population of approximately 13,000 people. The inhabitants of San Pedro are primarily Tz'utujil Maya, with a small, but growing, expatriate community. The population is over 90 percent indigenous. The expatriate community that is forming within San Pedro La Laguna is composed of Americans and Europeans.

=== Religion ===
Catholicism is the religion that is the most dominant in San Pedro La Laguna. It has been the most dominant religion since the 16th century, when Spain colonized Central America.

Although the Catholic religion has been dominant for centuries, about half of the population still practices traditional Maya rituals either separately, syncretically, or alongside another religion. Xocomil, a wind coming from the south that "carries away sin", usually visits the Lake Atitlán area around midday. If the wind is coming from the north, the Maya claim, the lake's spirit is getting rid of a person who has drowned after claiming his or her soul.

In 2010, due to an influx of Jewish tourists and immigrants from Israel and North America, a synagogue and kosher restaurant were opened by an Israeli organization known as Chabad of San Pedro, Guatemala. Today, many Israeli businesses in the town have Hebrew language signs and advertising.

== Government ==
San Pedro La Laguna is in the Sololá department of Guatemala. San Pedro La Laguna is separated into four cantons: Pacucha, Chuacante, Chuasanahi, and Tzanjay.

San Pedro La Laguna passed a town ordinance in October of 2016 to ban the use of plastic, which includes straws and plastic bags. The citizens have opted to utilize readily made textiles, baskets, etc. for daily use during their shopping trips. Residents have complained of contamination in the lake, caused by pollution, increased population, tourism, and cyanotoxin, a bacterium which has substantially increased since 2009.

== Customs ==
Museo Tz'unun 'Ya is a museum documenting local history and customs, including the formation of the lake and colorized photos of pre-Civil War San Pedro La Laguna. Indigenous medical traditions are still commonly practiced by healers, known as curanderos.

== History ==
=== Civil War ===
The Guatemalan Civil War spanned the years from 1960 to 1996. During this time San Pedro La Laguna remained relatively unaffected and unharmed by the surrounding violence. However, from the years of 1980 to 1982 there was a series of kidnappings and murders in the community. It became known that the local military commissioners were behind these actions. It was alleged that villagers were blacklisted for many different activities including promoting adult education in the local Mayan language (Tzʼutujil), and celebrating the anniversary of the victory of the Sandinista National Liberation Front in Nicaragua. Local commissioners in collaboration with the Guatemalan Army painted Organization of People in Arms and other guerrilla signs on walls, and disseminated leaflets around the village at night to support allegations and feign a guerrilla presence in the village. This continued for nearly two years until August 1982, when higher military officials intervened.

== Gallery ==
Sunday in the San Pedro La Laguna market with Senior Pedro Gonzalez y Gonzales.

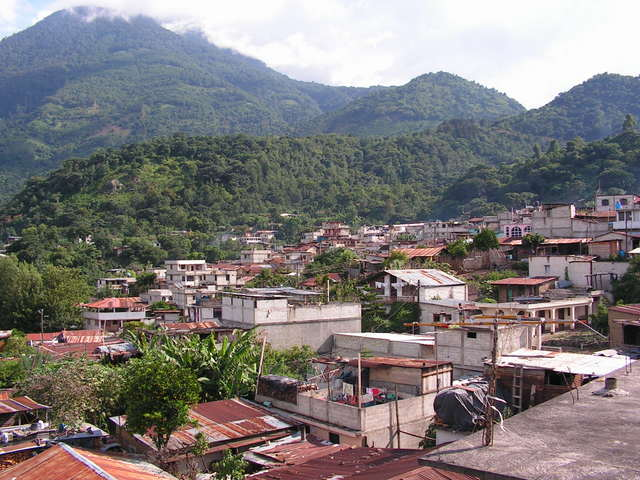
San Pedro la Laguna with Volcan San Pedro in the background.

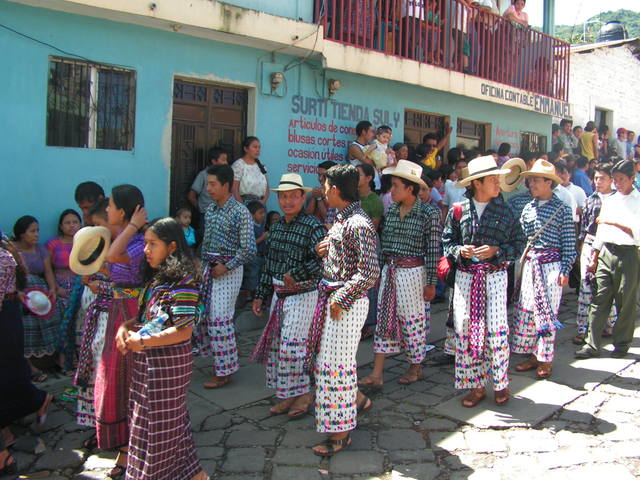
Independence day in San Pedro La Laguna, Oct. 2007

Immaculate Conception celebration on December 8 includes lively fireworks.
