= Santa Clara La Laguna =

Coordinates: 14°43′N 91°18′W

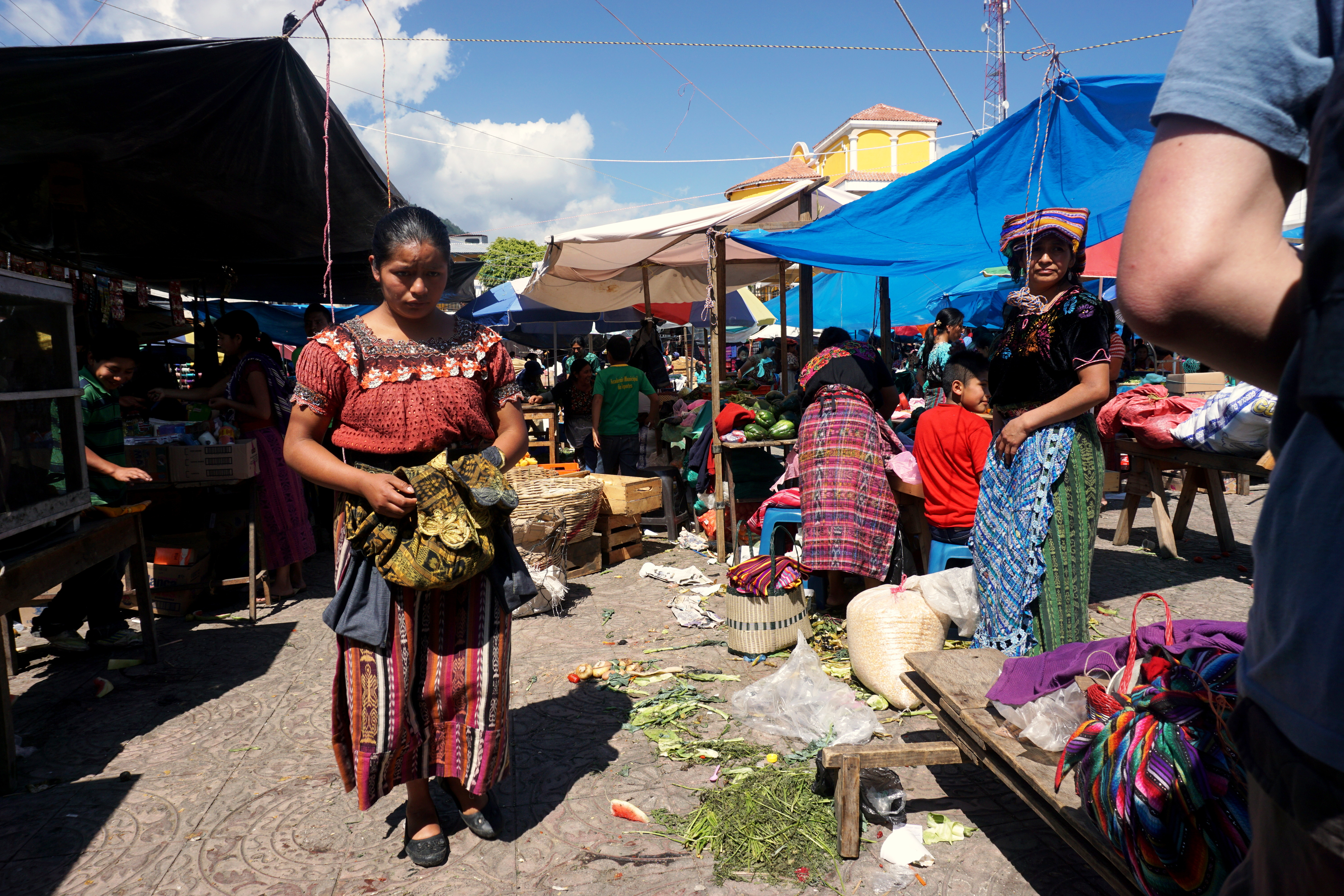
Market in Santa Clara la Laguna, Guatemala

Santa Clara La Laguna (Spanish pronunciation: [ˈsanta ˈklaɾa la laˈɣuna]) is a municipality in the Sololá department of Guatemala.

Location:

Lat: 14°42'49" N Lon: 91°18'16" W

UTM: Zone 15. Lat. 1628750 N Lon. 682600 E
