= Santa María Visitación =

Municipality of Sololá Department, Guatemala

Coordinates: 14°43′N 91°19′W

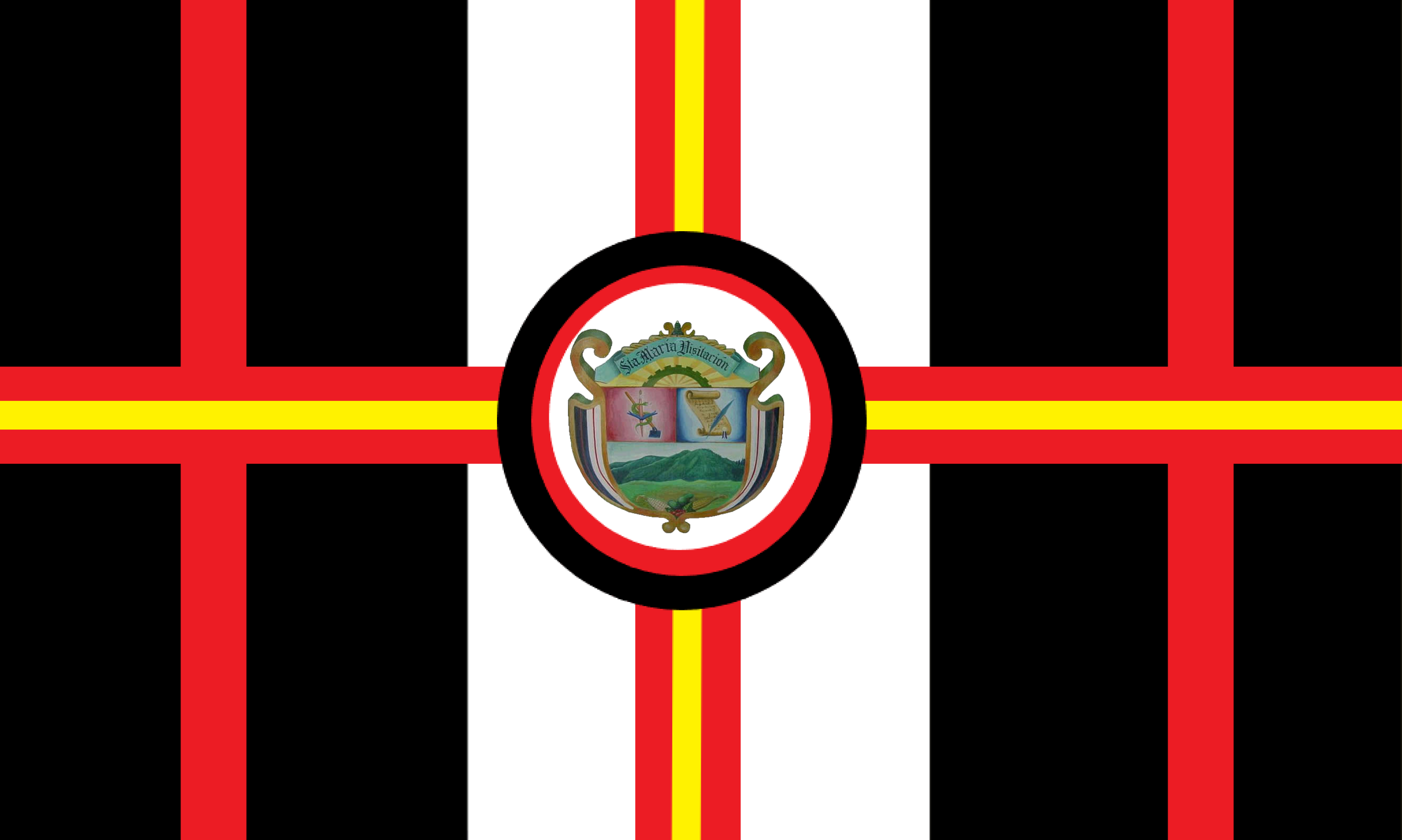
Flag of Santa María Visitación

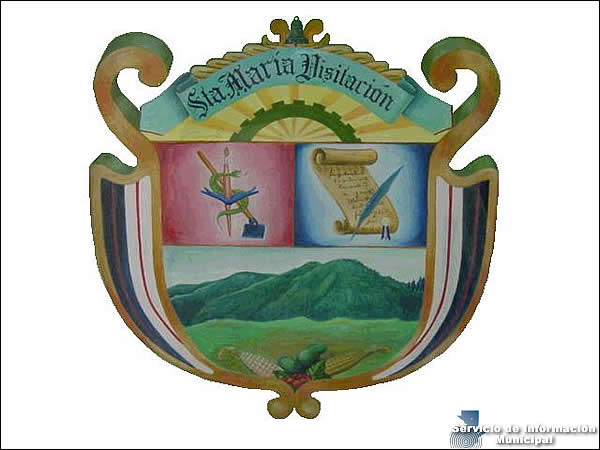
Coat of arms of Santa María Visitación

Santa María Visitación (Spanish pronunciation: [ˈsanta maˈɾi.a βisitaˈsjon]) is a municipality in the Sololá department of Guatemala.
