= Santa Cruz La Laguna =

- Municipality and town
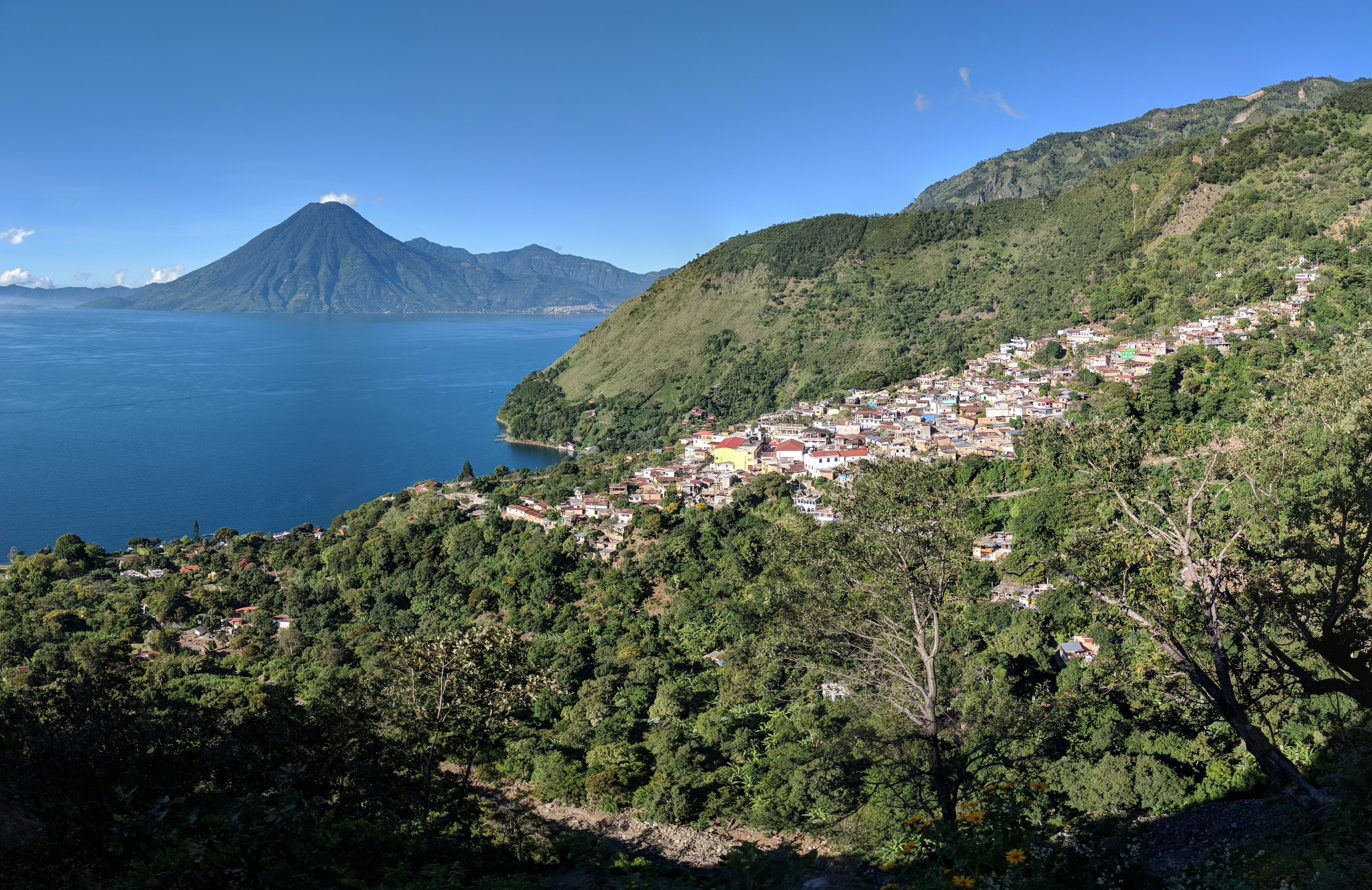
- Santa Cruz La Laguna

- location in Guatemala
- Coordinates: 14°44′40.2″N 91°12′25.2″W
- Country: Guatemala
- Department: Sololá

Area
  - Total: 12 km^{2} (4.6 sq mi)
- Elevation: 1,665 m (5,463 ft)
- Highest elevation: 2,520 m (8,270 ft)
- Lowest elevation: 1,562 m (5,125 ft)

Population (2018)
  - Total: 9,392
  - Density: 350/km^{2} (910/sq mi)
- Time zone: UTC-6 (Central Time)
- Postal code: 07014
- Country calling code: 502
- Climate: Cwb

Santa Cruz La Laguna is a municipality located on the northern shore of Lago de Atitlán in the Sololá department of Guatemala. It consists of the villages of Santa Cruz La Laguna and Tzununá as well as four smaller villages (caseríos). As of 2018 the estimated population is 9,392 people and the area is populated almost entirely by the Kaq'chikel indigenous Maya people.

== Village ==
Santa Cruz La Laguna is a traditional Maya village located on the steep mountainside of the lake, roughly 325 vertical feet (99 m) above the lake's surface (population: approximately 3,100). The village has the unique characteristic of being accessible only by boat or footpath. A single, winding road connects the dock to the village. There is a very rough road connecting Santa Cruz to Sololá which is used to transport heavy goods, concrete blocks, furniture, and a few vehicles.

The village has no roads, telephone system, or commercial center, although a common gathering place in the village is the sports court, used for basketball and soccer by the children of the village. Electricity is intermittent and expensive, and is therefore not installed in many households.

== Photos ==
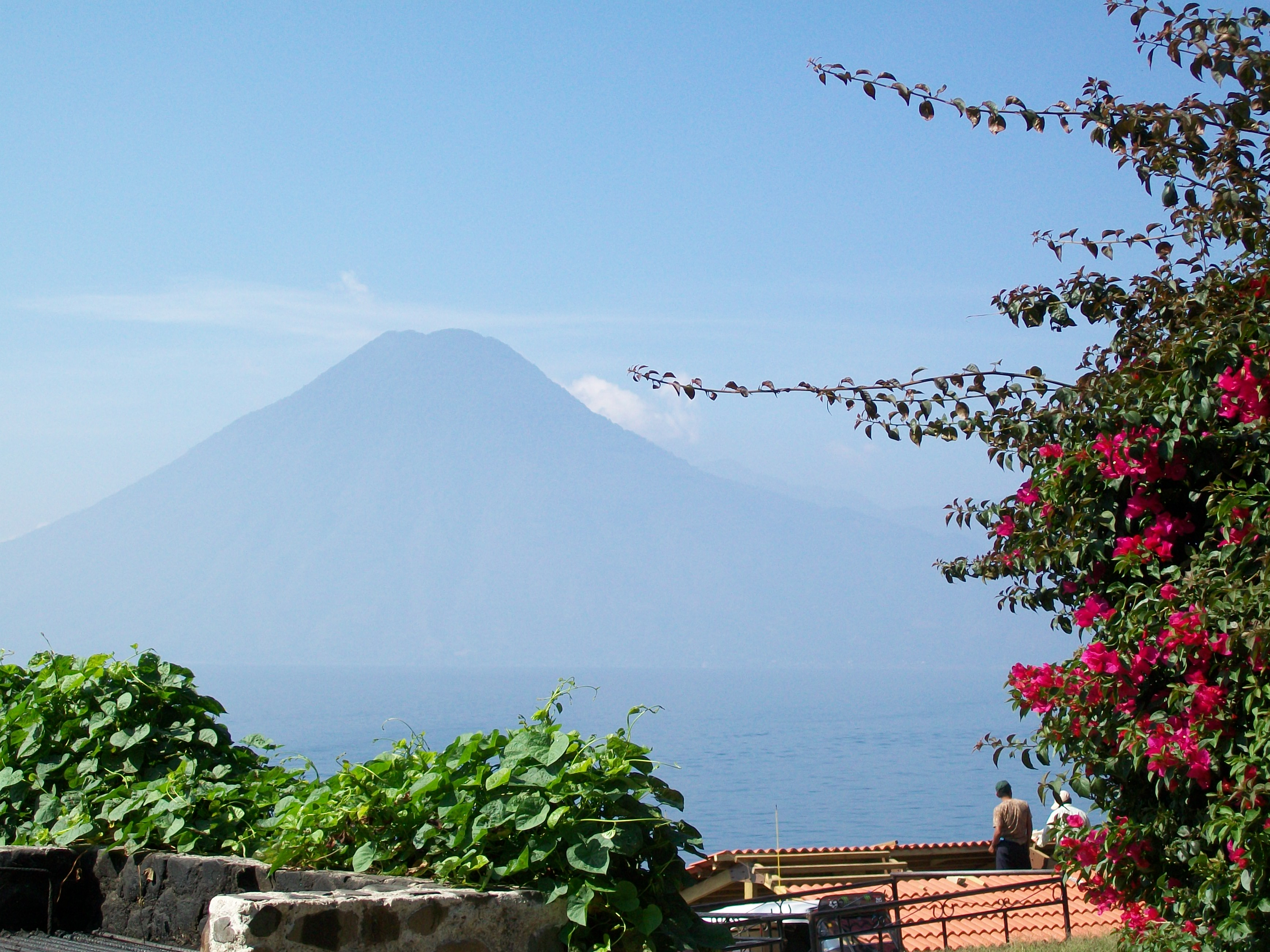

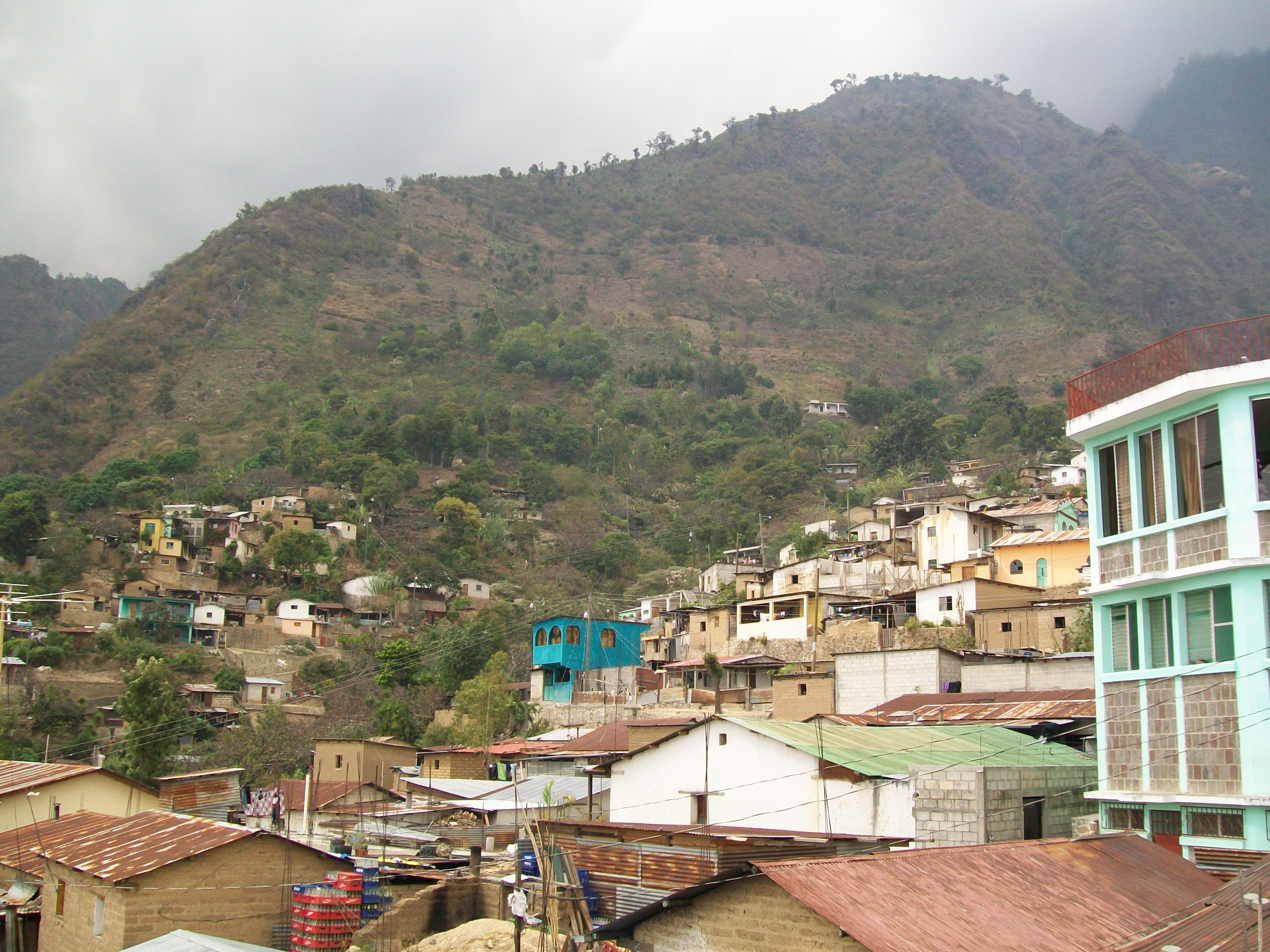

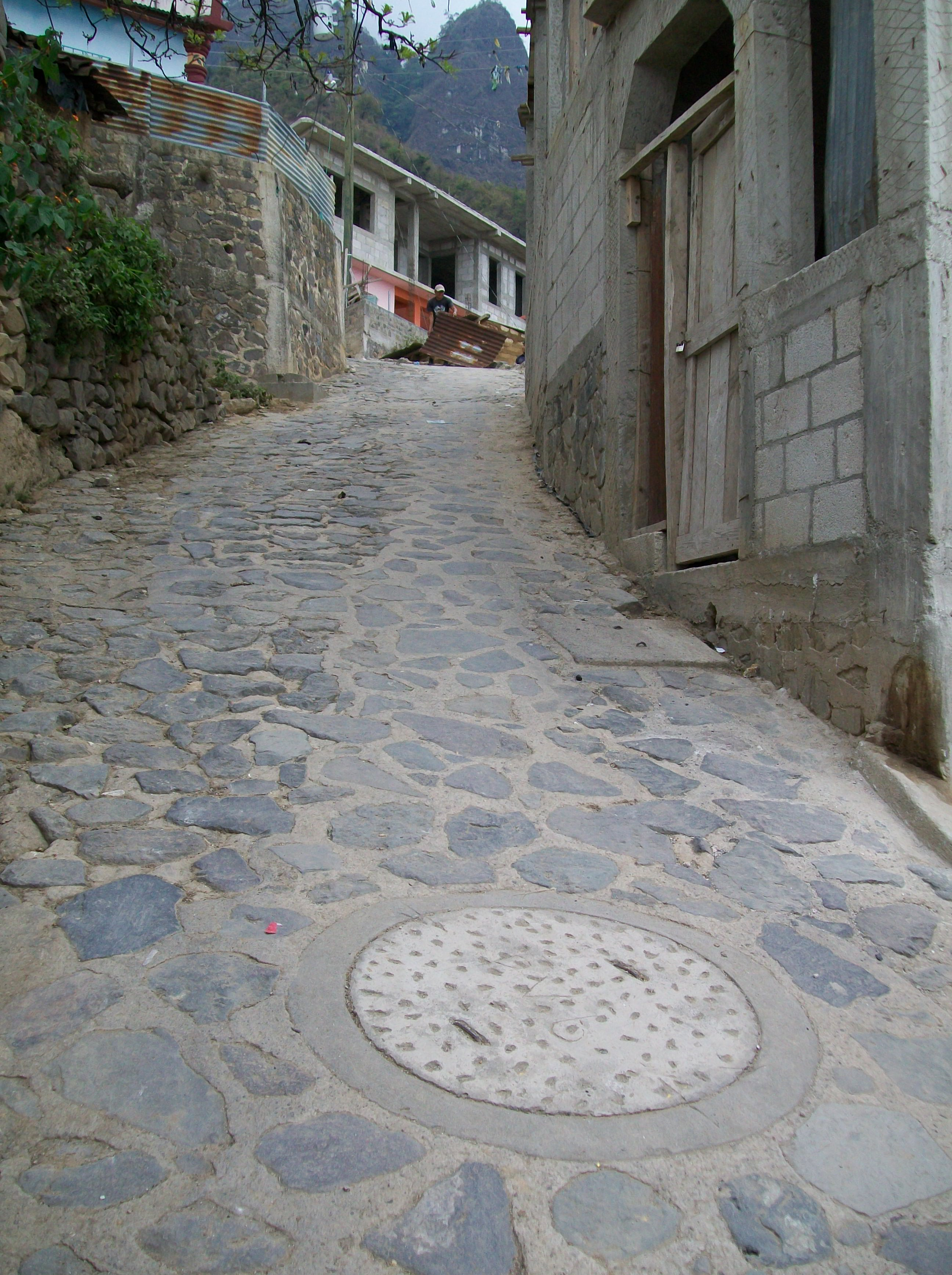

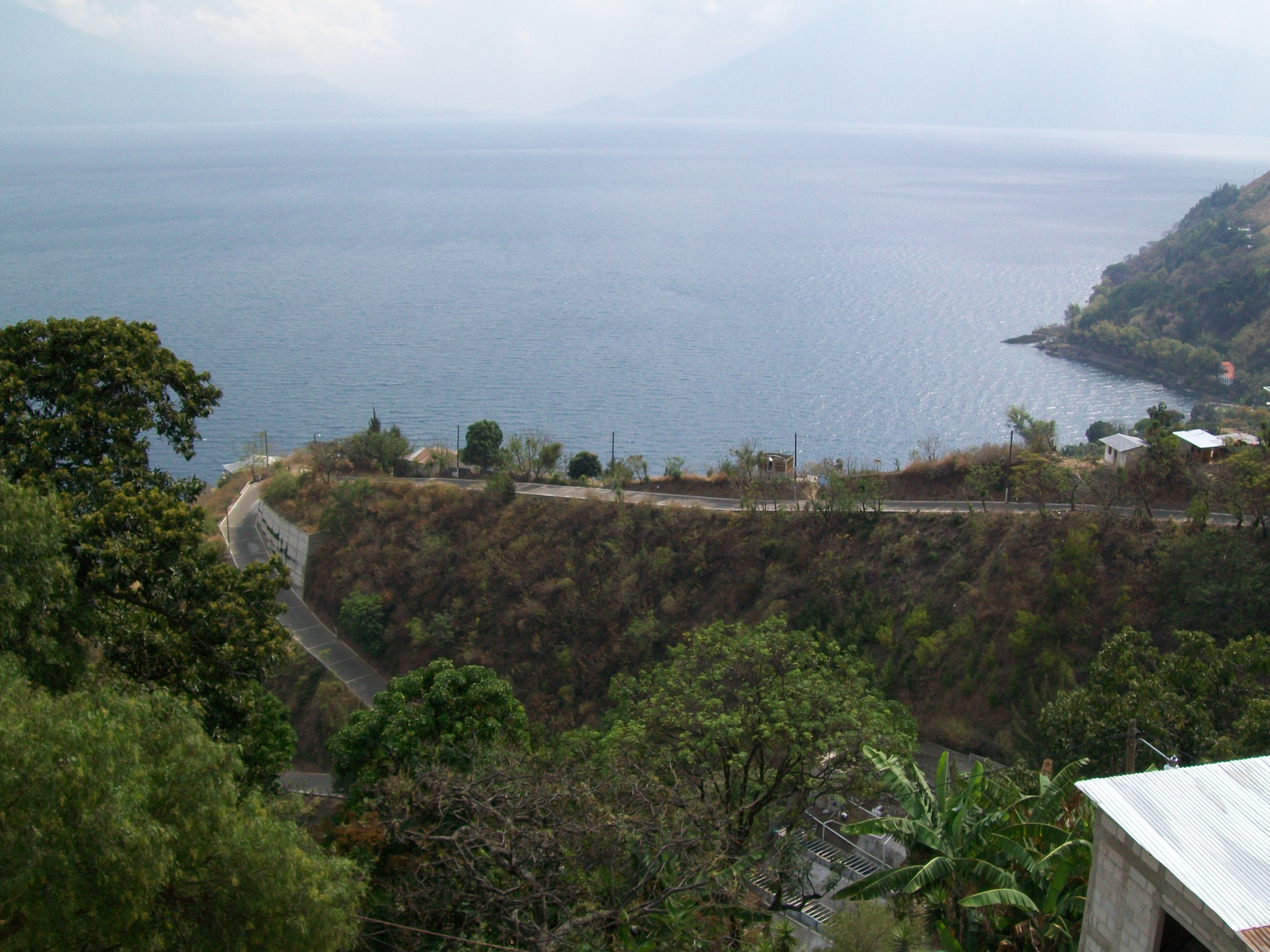

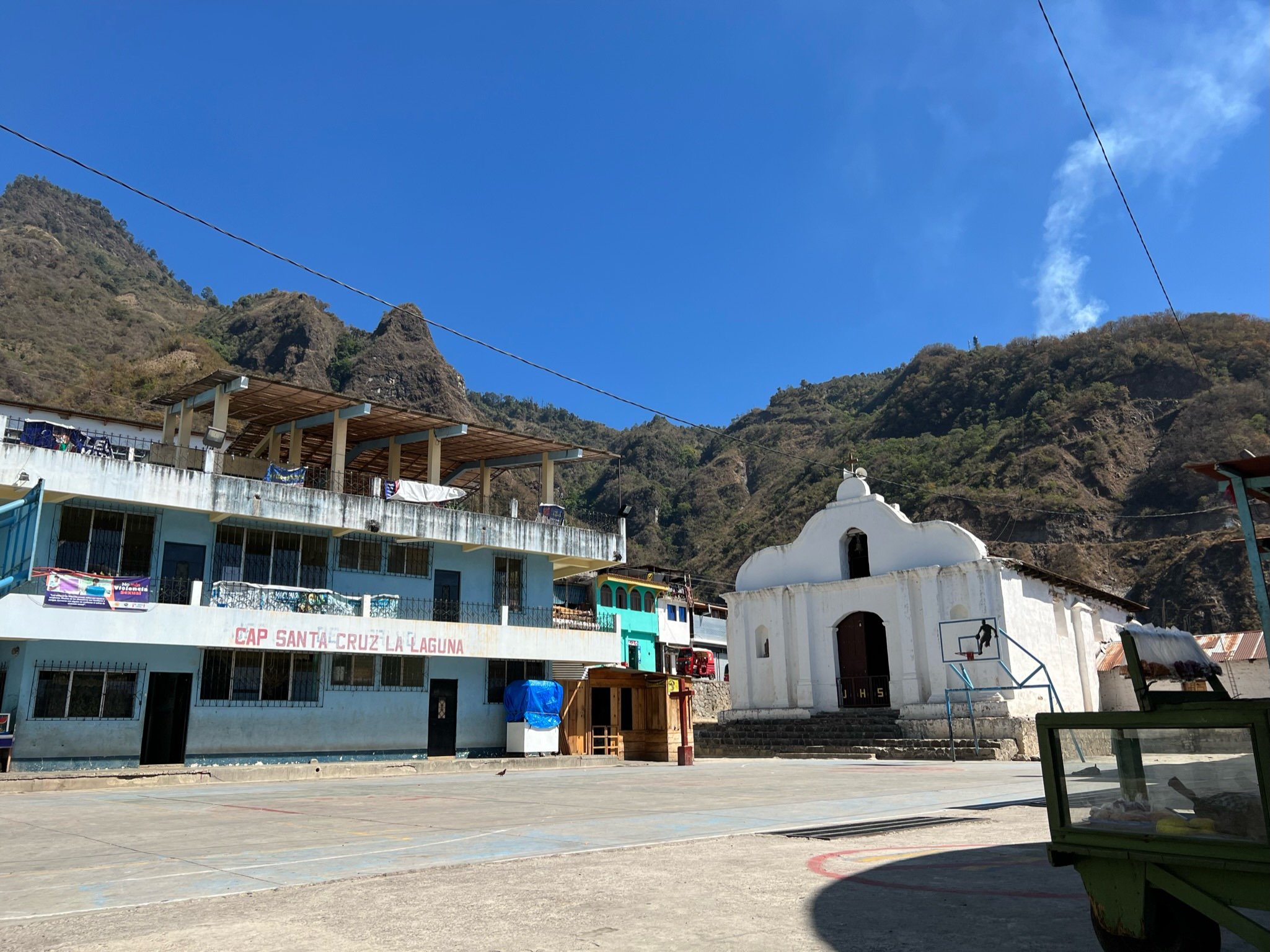
