= Sololá =

Sololá Tz'olojya (Kaqchikel)
- Municipality
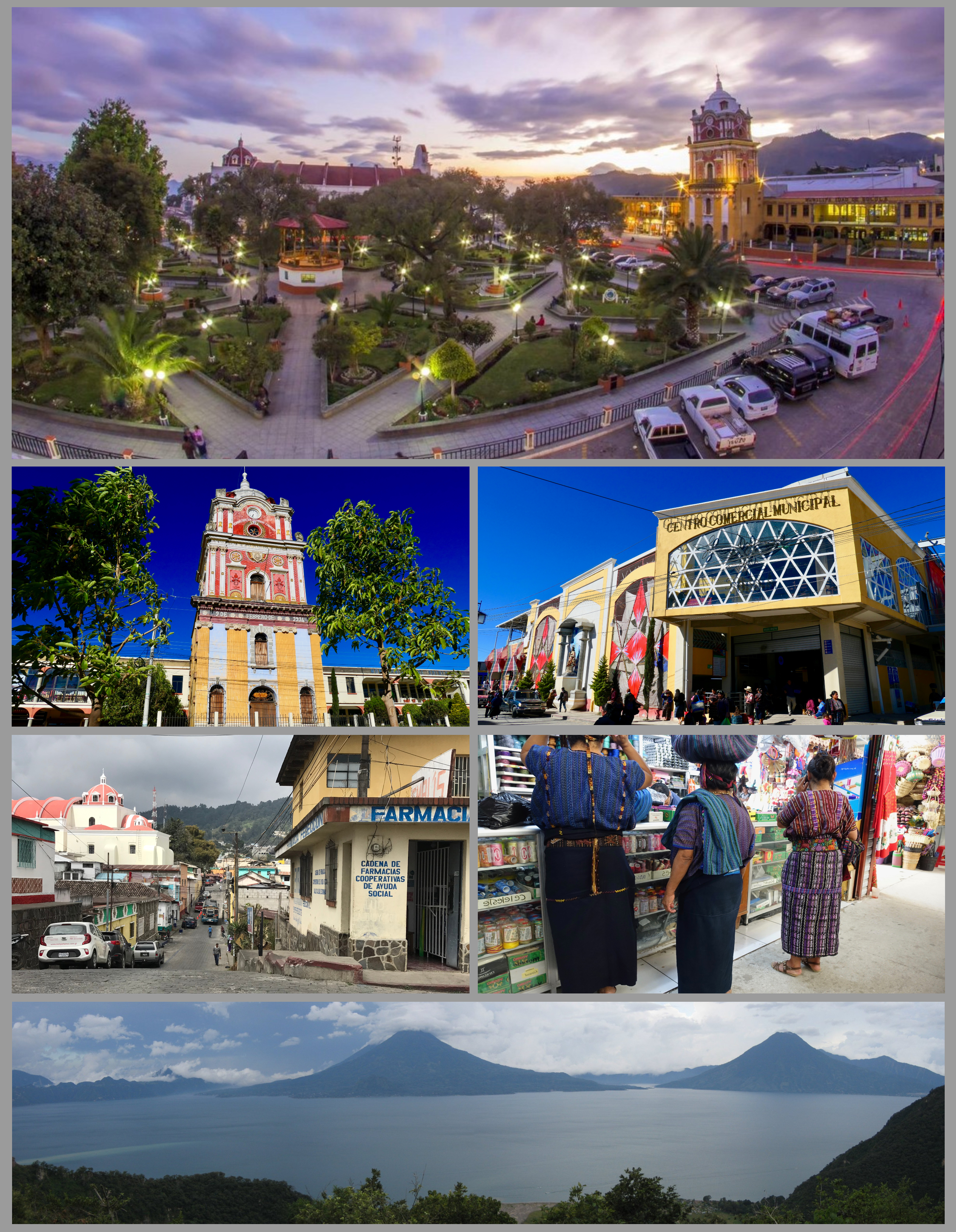
- Sololá, Guatemala.

- Flag Seal

- Location in Guatemala
- Coordinates: 14°46′N 91°11′W
- Country: Guatemala
- Department: Sololá
- Municipality: Sololá
- Founded: 1547

Government
  - Type: Municipal

Area
  - Municipality: 94 km^{2} (36 sq mi)
- Elevation: 2,114 m (6,936 ft)

Population (2021)
  - Municipality: 99,934
  - Urban: 30,155
  - Ethnicities: Kaqchikel K'iche' Ladino
  - Religions: Roman Catholicism Evangelicalism Maya
- Climate: Cwb
- Website: inforpressca.com/solola

Sololá is a city in Guatemala. It is the capital of the department of Sololá and the administrative seat of Sololá municipality. It is located close to Lake Atitlán.

The name is a Hispanicized form of its pre-Columbian name, one spelling variant of which is Tz'olojya. The urban center has about 14,000 people, but the municipality also includes four village communities — Los Encuentros, El Tablón, San Jorge la Laguna, and Argueta — as well as 59 smaller rural communities.

Sololá is situated at 2,114 m altitude on a mountainside overlooking Lake Atitlán, some 600 meters below. It is a highland market center and is the headquarters for the Catholic Bishopric encompassing the Sololá and Chimaltenango Departments.

Almost all residents of Sololá are Kaqchikel Maya, except in Argueta, where most are K'iche' Maya. A large percentage of both men and women continue to wear traditional Mayan clothing.

Sololá is home to many international organizations including Manna Project International, Friendship Bridge, Mayan Families and Love Futbol.

== Climate ==
The climate is a subtropical highland (Köppen: Cwb), very similar to that of the Asian monsoons with months almost without any rain. Most of the precipitation is in the summer and early fall. Temperatures during the year have low fluctuation, with a relatively cold low average in winter (7.4 °C in January) and summers are cool with April the hottest month having a high of 23.2 °C.

Climate data for Sololá
Month	Jan	Feb	Mar	Apr	May	Jun	Jul	Aug	Sep	Oct	Nov	Dec	Year
Mean daily maximum °C (°F)	20.2 (68.4)	21.0 (69.8)	22.3 (72.1)	23.2 (73.8)	22.8 (73.0)	21.0 (69.8)	21.4 (70.5)	21.9 (71.4)	21.2 (70.2)	20.9 (69.6)	20.8 (69.4)	20.1 (68.2)	21.4 (70.5)
Daily mean °C (°F)	13.8 (56.8)	14.3 (57.7)	15.5 (59.9)	16.9 (62.4)	17.5 (63.5)	16.6 (61.9)	16.7 (62.1)	16.6 (61.9)	16.4 (61.5)	16.0 (60.8)	14.9 (58.8)	13.9 (57.0)	15.8 (60.4)
Mean daily minimum °C (°F)	7.4 (45.3)	7.6 (45.7)	8.7 (47.7)	10.6 (51.1)	12.2 (54.0)	12.3 (54.1)	12.0 (53.6)	11.3 (52.3)	11.6 (52.9)	11.2 (52.2)	9.1 (48.4)	7.8 (46.0)	10.1 (50.3)
Average precipitation mm (inches)	0 (0)	2 (0.1)	5 (0.2)	23 (0.9)	76 (3.0)	269 (10.6)	243 (9.6)	258 (10.2)	401 (15.8)	160 (6.3)	34 (1.3)	1 (0.0)	1,472 (58)
Source: Climate-data.org

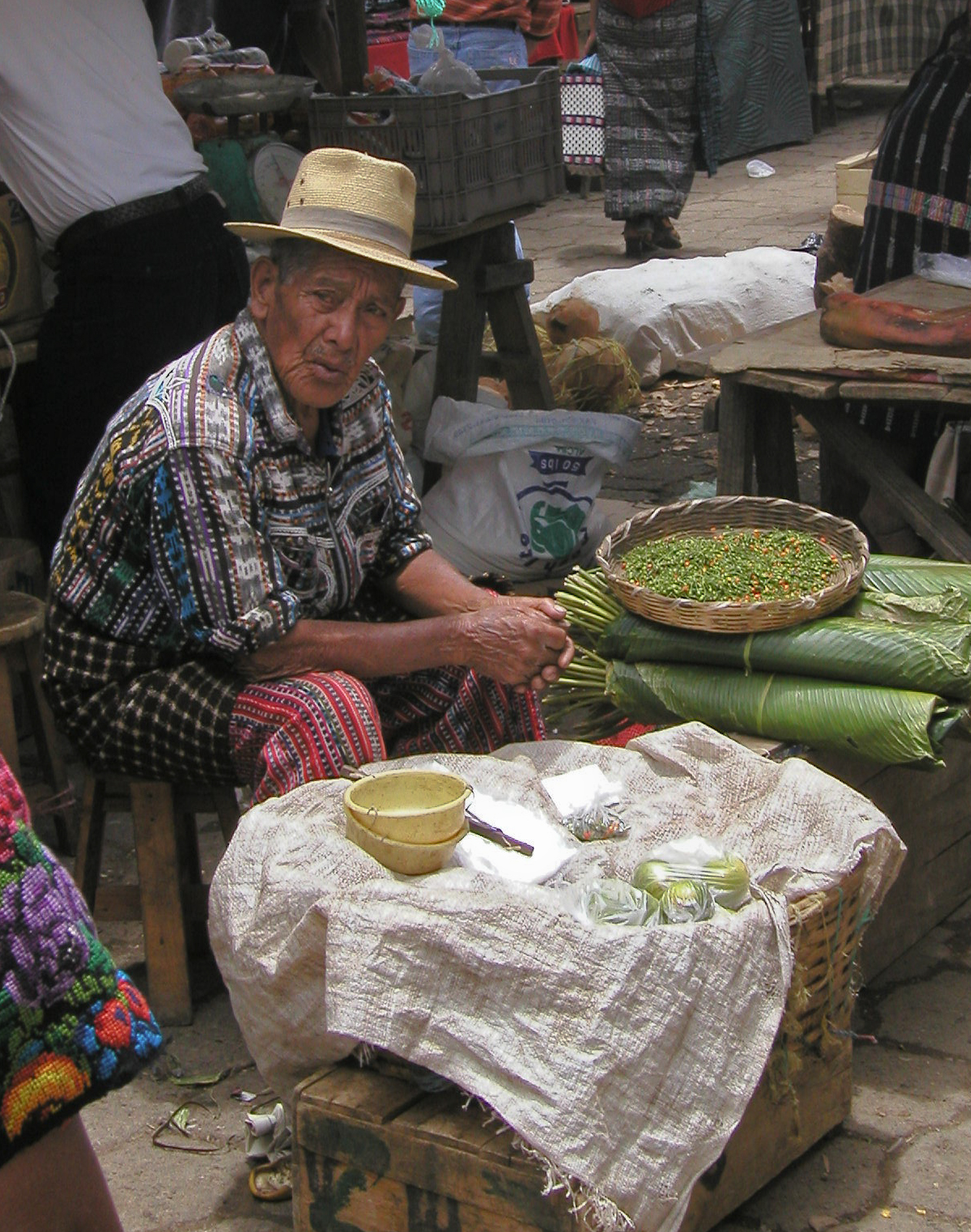
Sololá market

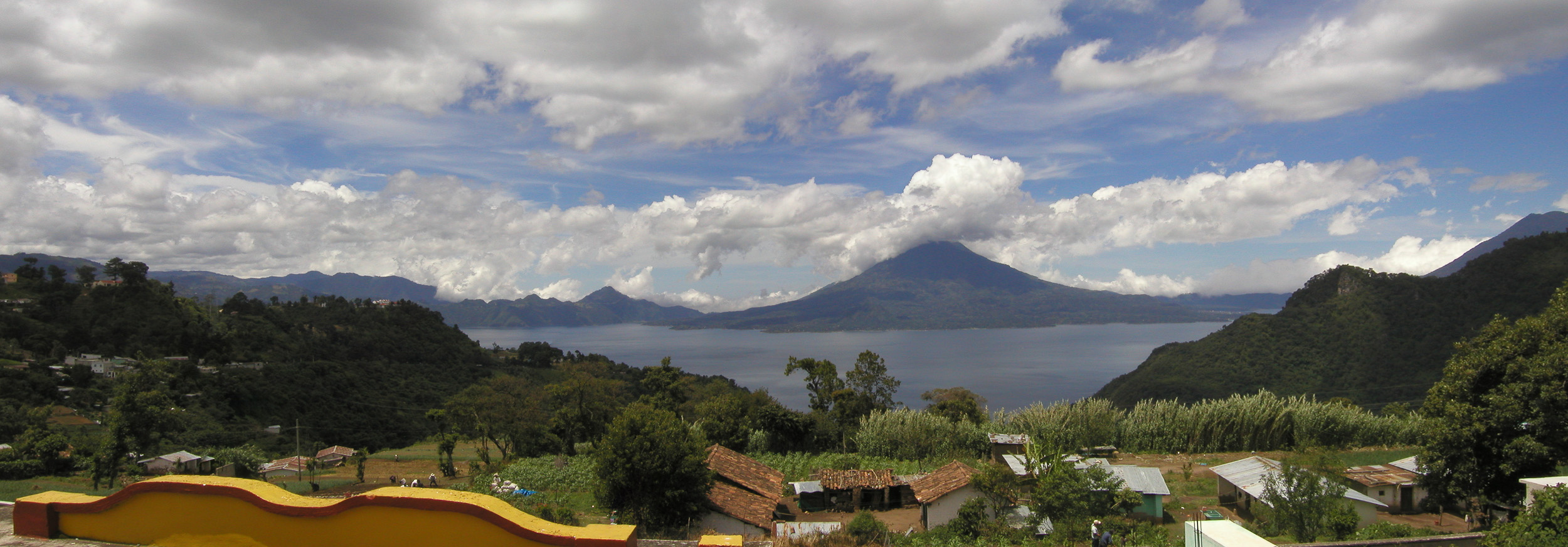
Overlooking Lake Atitlán

== See also ==
- List of places in Guatemala
