= Santiago Atitlán =

Santiago Atitlán Tz'ikin Jaay
- City
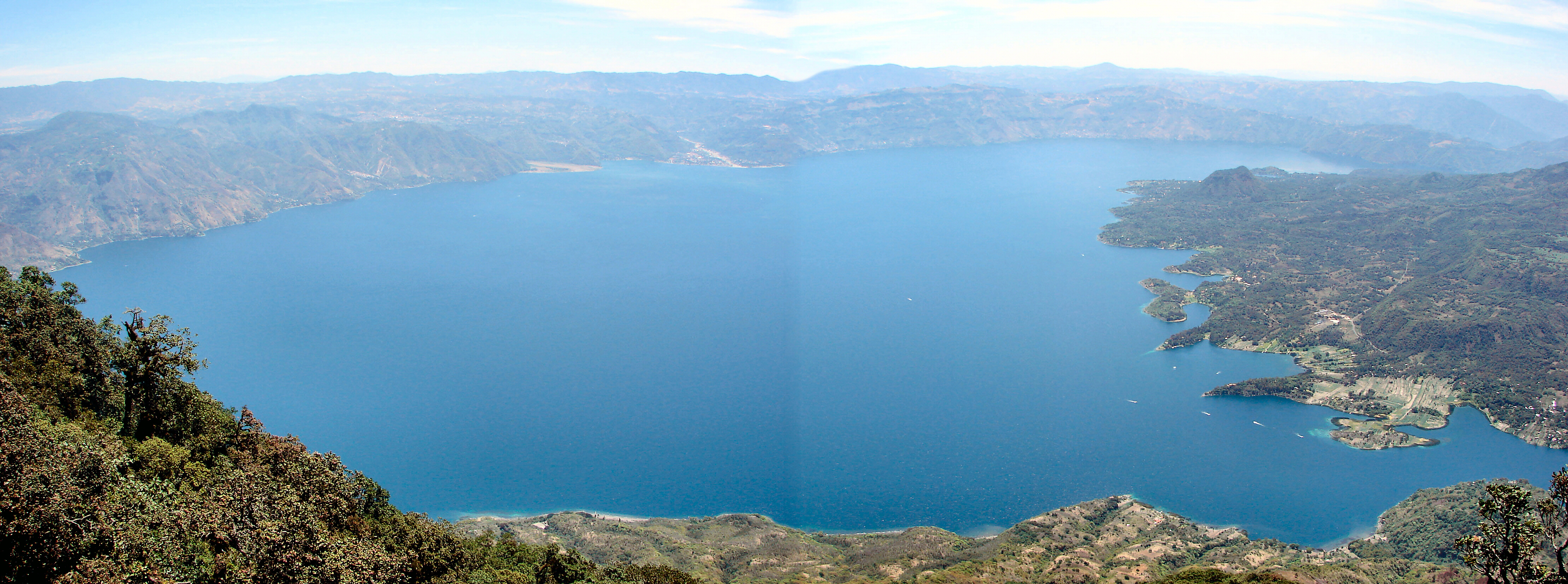
- Santiago (on right) and Lake Atitlán from Volcan San Pedro

- Location in Guatemala
- Coordinates: 14°38′N 91°14′W
- Country: Guatemala
- Department: Sololá
- Elevation: 1,567 m (5,141 ft)
- Highest elevation: 3,516 m (11,535 ft)
- Lowest elevation: 1,562 m (5,125 ft)

Population
  - Total: 44,854
- Time zone: UTC-6 (Central Time)
- Country calling code: 502
- Climate: Aw

Santiago Atitlán (Spanish pronunciation: [sanˈtjaɣo atiˈtlan], from Nahuatl atitlan, "at the water", in Tz'utujil Tz'ikin Jaay, "birdhouse") is a municipality in the Sololá department of Guatemala.

== Geography ==
The town is situated on Lake Atitlán, which has an elevation of 5,105 feet (1,556 m). The town sits on a bay of Lake Atitlán between two volcanoes. Volcán San Pedro rises to 2,846 metres (9,337 ft) west of the town and Volcan Toliman rises to 3,144 metres (10,315 ft) southeast of the town. Volcán Atitlán, with an elevation of 3,516 metres (11,535 ft), is south-southeast of the town. Santiago Atitlan is southwest of Panajachel across the lake. Major highways reach Lake Atitlán at San Lucas Toliman and Panajachel. A road links Santiago to San Lucas Tolliman. Boats connect the numerous communities around the lake.

=== Climate ===
Santiago Atitlán has a tropical savanna climate (Köppen: Aw) with warm days and cool nights. Santiago Atitlán has a wet season extending from May to October. The rainiest months are typically June and September.

Climate data for Santiago Atitlán (1991–2020)
Month	Jan	Feb	Mar	Apr	May	Jun	Jul	Aug	Sep	Oct	Nov	Dec	Year
Record high °C (°F)	29.2 (84.6)	29.5 (85.1)	30.5 (86.9)	33.0 (91.4)	31.8 (89.2)	30.6 (87.1)	30.5 (86.9)	30.0 (86.0)	30.5 (86.9)	29.0 (84.2)	29.5 (85.1)	29.5 (85.1)	33.0 (91.4)
Mean daily maximum °C (°F)	25.2 (77.4)	25.5 (77.9)	25.9 (78.6)	26.1 (79.0)	25.4 (77.7)	24.8 (76.6)	25.9 (78.6)	25.6 (78.1)	24.7 (76.5)	24.8 (76.6)	25.2 (77.4)	25.3 (77.5)	25.4 (77.7)
Daily mean °C (°F)	18.1 (64.6)	18.5 (65.3)	18.9 (66.0)	19.7 (67.5)	19.9 (67.8)	19.6 (67.3)	20.2 (68.4)	19.7 (67.5)	18.9 (66.0)	18.9 (66.0)	18.8 (65.8)	18.3 (64.9)	19.1 (66.4)
Mean daily minimum °C (°F)	11.2 (52.2)	11.2 (52.2)	12.4 (54.3)	13.4 (56.1)	14.6 (58.3)	14.6 (58.3)	14.5 (58.1)	14.4 (57.9)	14.2 (57.6)	13.7 (56.7)	12.8 (55.0)	11.8 (53.2)	13.2 (55.8)
Record low °C (°F)	3.0 (37.4)	6.2 (43.2)	6.0 (42.8)	7.8 (46.0)	10.1 (50.2)	9.0 (48.2)	9.9 (49.8)	10.0 (50.0)	7.1 (44.8)	8.6 (47.5)	4.0 (39.2)	5.7 (42.3)	3.0 (37.4)
Average precipitation mm (inches)	6.6 (0.26)	10.8 (0.43)	27.5 (1.08)	58.9 (2.32)	169.1 (6.66)	279.4 (11.00)	133.4 (5.25)	151.7 (5.97)	237.2 (9.34)	183.7 (7.23)	37.4 (1.47)	13.6 (0.54)	1,309.3 (51.55)
Average precipitation days (≥ 1.0 mm)	0.9	1.0	2.8	5.0	13.7	20.0	14.2	15.1	19.8	13.9	3.9	1.5	111.8
Source: NOAA

== Demography ==
The majority of the residents are indigenous Maya. It was the capital of the Tz'utujil people in pre-Columbian times and its name was Chuitinamit.

Santiago Atitlán is the home of the Cojolya Weaving Center and Museum, founded by the Cojolya Association of Maya Women Weavers. The museum shows the history, tradition, and process of backstrap-loom weaving, the evolution of the traditional costume of the Tzutujil, and tells about the indigenous people of Santiago Atitlán.

== History ==
Santiago Atitlán was the site of considerable state-sponsored violence during the country's civil war. Some of the most notable incidents that occurred during the war include the assassination of Roman Catholic priest Stanley Rother by right-wing death squads on 28 July 1981, and the massacre of 14 people (and wounding of 21 others) when the Guatemalan Army opened fire on a crowd of unarmed civilians on 2 December 1990.
