= Ipala =

Ipala may refer to:

- Ipala, Bam, Burkina Faso
- Ipala, Ganzourgou, Burkina Faso
- Ipala, Guatemala a municipality in Guatemala
- Ipala (volcano) in Guatemala
- Ipala Lake in Guatemala
- Ipala (Tanzanian ward), a ward in Tanzania
