= List of volcanoes in Guatemala =

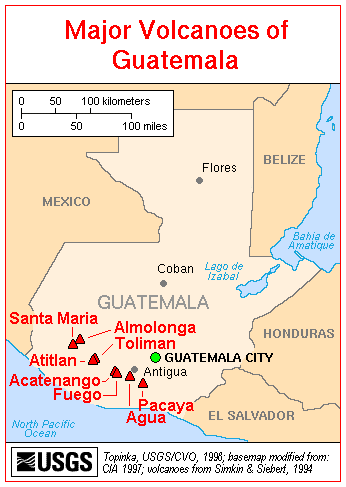
Major volcanoes in Guatemala.

This is a list of active, dormant, and extinct volcanoes in Guatemala.

== Volcanoes ==
Name	Elevation (m)	Elevation (ft)	Coordinates	Last eruption
Acatenango	3976	13,044	14°30′02″N 90°52′33″W	1972
Agua	3760	12,336	14°27′53″N 90°44′35″W	Holocene
Almolonga	3197	10,489	14°49′00″N 91°29′00″W	1818
Atitlán	3535	11,598	14°34′58″N 91°11′11″W	1853
Chingo	1775	5823	14°07′00″N 89°44′00″W	Holocene
Cerro Santiago	1192	3911	14°20′00″N 89°52′00″W	Holocene
Cerro de Oro	1892	6207	14°39′50″N 91°10′41″W	Holocene
Chicabal	2900	9514	14°47′00″N 91°40′00″W	-
Chiquimula Volcanic Field	1192	3911	14°50′00″N 89°33′00″W	Holocene
Coxóm	3045	10007	14°53′15″N 91°23′52″W	
Cuilapa-Barbarena	1454	4770	14°20′00″N 90°24′00″W	Holocene
Flores	1600	5249	14°18′28″N 89°59′32″W	Holocene
Fuego	3763	12,346	14°28′22″N 90°52′49″W	2018 (ongoing)
Ipala	1650	5413	14°33′00″N 89°38′00″W	Holocene
Ixtepeque	1292	4239	14°25′00″N 89°41′00″W	Holocene
Jumaytepeque	1815	5955	14°20′08″N 90°16′10″W	Holocene
Atitlán III Caldera		11,598	14°42′00″N 91°12′00″W	85,000 years ago
Moyuta	1662	5453	14°02′00″N 90°06′00″W	-
Pacaya	2552	8373	14°22′51″N 90°36′04″W	2013 (ongoing)
Quezaltepeque	1200	3937	14°34′00″N 89°27′00″W	Holocene
San Pedro	3020	9908	14°39′21″N 91°15′57″W	-
Santa María	3772	12,375	14°45′21″N 91°33′06″W	2013
Santo Tomas	3542	11,621	14°42′37″N 91°28′43″W	84,000 years ago
Siete Orejas	3370	11060	14°48′53″N 91°37′04″W	-
Suchitán	2042	6699	14°24′00″N 89°47′00″W	1469
Tacaná	4060	13,320	15°07′48″N 92°06′45″W	1986
Tahual	1716	5630	14°26′00″N 89°54′00″W	Holocene
Tajumulco	4220	13,845	15°02′04″N 91°54′12″W	1863
Tecuamburro	1845	6053	14°09′22″N 90°24′25″W	960 BC ± 75 years
Tolimán	3158	10,361	14°36′45″N 91°11′21″W	Holocene

== See also ==
- Central America Volcanic Arc
- List of volcanoes in El Salvador
- List of volcanoes in Honduras
- List of volcanoes in Mexico
