= Quezaltepeque =

Quezaltepeque may refer to:

El Salvador

- Quezaltepeque, La Libertad
- Quezaltepec (volcano)

Guatemala

- Quezaltepeque, Chiquimula
- Quezaltepeque (volcano)
