= Tolimán (volcano) =

Mountain in Sololá, Guatemala

Volcán Tolimán
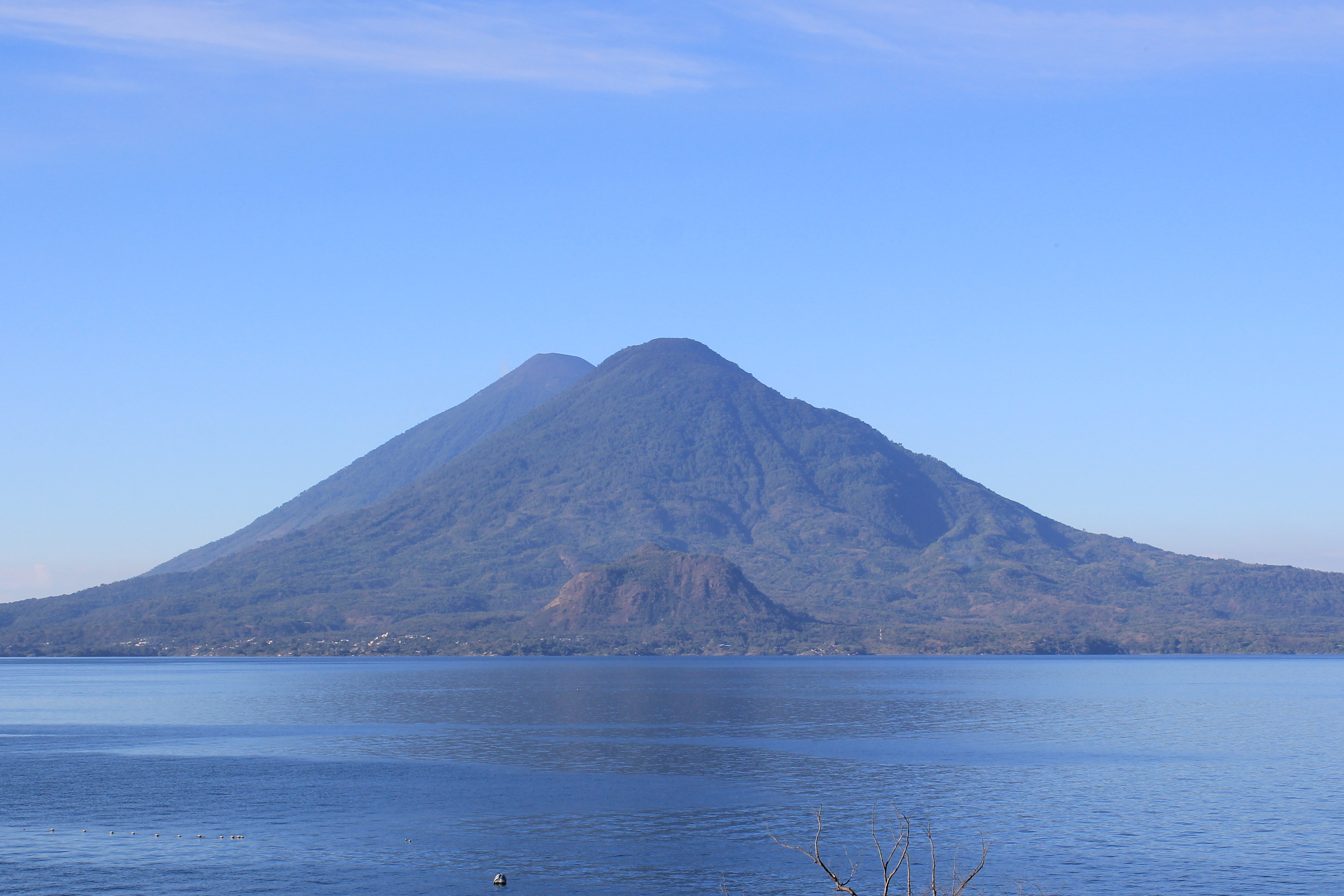
- Volcán Tolimán from Panajachel (behind it is Volcán Atitlán)

Highest point
- Elevation: 3,158 m (10,361 ft)
- Prominence: 603 m (1,978 ft)
- Coordinates: 14°36′48″N 91°11′22″W

Geography
- Location within Guatemala
- Location: Sololá, Guatemala
- Parent range: Sierra Madre

Geology
- Mountain type: Stratovolcano
- Volcanic arc: Central America Volcanic Arc
- Last eruption: Unknown

Tolimán, also known as Volcán Tolimán, is a stratovolcano in Guatemala, on the southern shores of Lake Atitlán. Part of the Sierra Madre mountain range, the volcano has an elevation of 3,158 m (10,361 ft) and was formed near the southern margin of the Pleistocene Atitlán III caldera. The top of the volcano has a shallow crater and its flanks are covered with the thick remains of ancient lava flows that emerged from vents in the volcano's flanks.

== Cerro de Oro ==
A parasitic lava dome, known as Cerro de Oro, was formed on the volcano's northern flank, which may have erupted a few thousand years ago.

The following table synthesizes the primary geomorphological features, parasitic structures, and ecological zones associated with Volcán Tolimán:

Geomorphological, Volcanological, and Ecological Profile of Volcán Tolimán
Sector / Structure	Elevation Range	Geological Features & Volcanology	Ecosystem & Associated Biodiversity
Main Summit Crater	3,158 m (10,361 ft)	Shallow, elliptical crater with thick late-Pleistocene and Holocene andesite and dacite flows	High-altitude cloud forest featuring oak-pine mix, mosses, and epiphytes.
Northern Flank Lava Flows	1,800–2,600 m	Massive lava lobes extending down to the southern shore of Lake Atitlán	Dense tropical montane forest and shade-grown coffee agricultural plots.
Cerro de Oro Dome	1,895 m (6,217 ft)	Parasitic lava dome formed on the lower northern flank near the lake shore	Habitat for endemic bird species, including the horned guan (Oreophasis derbianus).

== Gallery ==
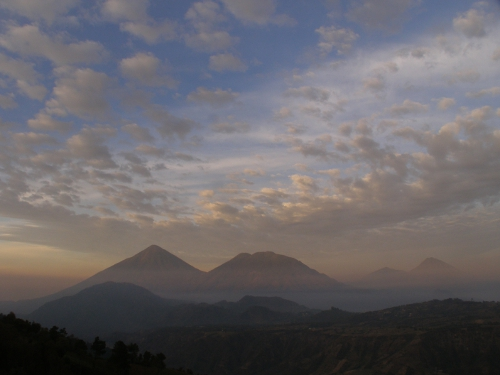
The volcanoes of Lake Atitlan; Atitlan (left center), Toliman (center), and San Pedro (far right), as seen from Pachimulin.

== See also ==
- List of volcanoes in Guatemala
