= Chiquimula Volcanic Field =

Volcanic field in Guatemala

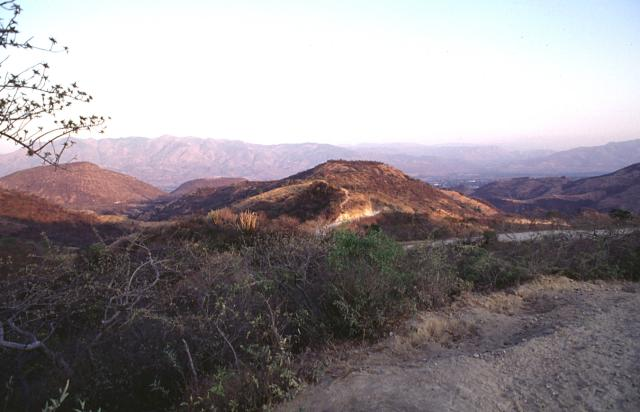

Highest point
- Elevation: 1,192 m (3,911 ft)
- Coordinates: 14°49′48″N 89°33′0″W

Geography
- Location within Guatemala
- Location: Chiquimula, Guatemala

Geology
- Mountain type: Volcanic field
- Volcanic arc: Central America Volcanic Arc
- Last eruption: unknown

The Chiquimula Volcanic Field is located in the Chiquimula valley in southern Guatemala.

== See also ==
- List of volcanoes in Guatemala
- List of volcanic fields
- Global Volcanism Program
