= Tahual =

Stratovolcano in Guatemala

Volcán Tahual
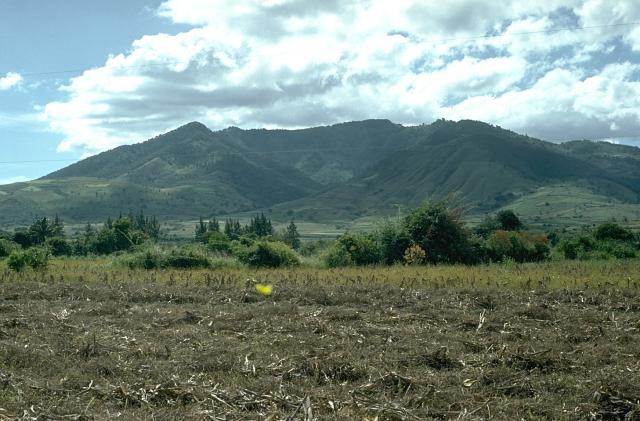
- Volcán Tahual, seen here from the NE

Highest point
- Elevation: 1,716 m (5,630 ft)
- Coordinates: 14°25′48″N 89°54′0″W

Geography
- Location within Guatemala
- Location: Guatemala

Geology
- Mountain type: Stratovolcano
- Volcanic arc: Central America Volcanic Arc
- Last eruption: Unknown

Tahual is a stratovolcano in southern Guatemala. The highest point of the volcano is at an altitude of 1,716 m (5,630 ft) above sea level.

== See also ==
- List of volcanoes in Guatemala
