= Volcán de Flores =

- Location within Guatemala

Highest point
- Elevation: 1,600 m (5,200 ft)
- Coordinates: 14°18′28″N 89°59′31″W

Geography
- Location: Jutiapa, Guatemala

Geology
- Mountain type: Stratovolcano
- Last eruption: unknown

Volcán de Flores is the most prominent stratovolcano in a volcanic field composed of several small volcanoes in southern Guatemala. With an elevation of 1,600 m (5,200 ft), it is located approximately 10 km west of the city of Jutiapa.

== See also ==
- List of volcanoes in Guatemala
