= Volcán Atitlán =

Active volcano in Guatemala

- Volcán Atitlán from the village of San Antonio Palopo

Highest point
- Elevation: 3,535 m (11,598 ft)
- Coordinates: 14°35′0″N 91°11′10″W

Naming
- Language of name: Nahuatl

Geography
- Location within Guatemala
- Location: Sololá Department, Guatemala
- Parent range: Sierra Madre de Chiapas

Geology
- Mountain type: Stratovolcano
- Volcanic arc: Central America Volcanic Arc
- Last eruption: May 1853

Volcán Atitlán (Spanish pronunciation: [atiˈtlan]) is a large, conical, active stratovolcano adjacent to the caldera of Lake Atitlán in the Guatemalan Highlands of the Sierra Madre de Chiapas range. It is within the Sololá Department, in southwestern Guatemala.

The volcano has been quite active historically, with more than a dozen eruptions recorded between 1469 and 1853, the date of its most recent eruption. Atitlán is part of the Central American Volcanic Arc. The arc is a chain of volcanoes stretching along Central America formed by subduction of the Cocos Plate underneath the Caribbean Plate. These volcanoes are part of the Ring of Fire around the Pacific Ocean.

Volcán Atitlán is a few miles south of Volcán Tolimán, which rises from the southern shore of Lake Atitlán. Volcán San Pedro rises above Lake Atitlán northwest of Volcán Atitlán. A long narrow bay separates Volcán Atitlán and Volcán Toliman from Volcán San Pedro.

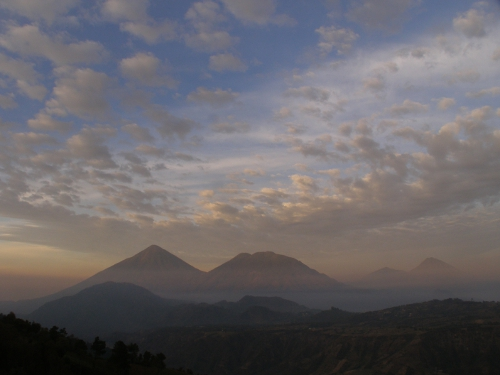
The volcanoes of Lake Atitlan: Atitlan (left center), Toliman (center), and San Pedro (far right).

== Wildlife ==
Atitlán is home to two particularly rare and beautiful birds that are endemic to the cloud forests of this region. The horned guan (Oreophasis derbianus) is a Pleistocene relic of the family Cracidae that persists today only in small fragments of its previous range. Its habitat is limited to cloud forests above approximately 1,650 metres (5,410 ft). This bird is the size of a turkey and the adult male has a one-inch scarlet-colored "horn" projecting straight up from the top of its head. The Cabanis's or azure-rumped tanager (Tangara cabanisi) is probably the most restricted-range species in the region. It occurs only at mid-elevations within the Sierra Madre del Sur of Chiapas, Mexico and western Guatemala.

The following table summarizes the key geomorphological characteristics, historical eruptive timeline, and elevational ecological zones of Volcán Atitlán:

Geomorphological, Eruptive, and Ecological Profile of Volcán Atitlán
Zonal / Structural Sector	Elevation Range	Geological & Eruptive Profile	Ecosystem & Endemic Species Habitat
Summit & Crater Zone	3,537 m (11,604 ft)	Active stratovolcano with a 250 m wide crater; historic explosive eruptions recorded between 1469 and 1853.	Alpine scrub, bare volcanic tephra, and fumarolic microclimates.
Upper Cloud Forest	2,200–3,100 m	Steep forested basaltic-andesite slopes integrated with the southern Lake Atitlán caldera wall.	Primary cloud forest habitat for the horned guan (Oreophasis derbianus) and tree ferns.
Lower Slopes & Foothills	1,500–2,100 m	Volcaniclastic fans extending toward the Pacific coastal plain.	Subtropical humid forest, shade-grown coffee agroecosystems, and habitat for Cabanis's tanager.

== See also ==
- List of volcanoes in Guatemala
- Los Chocoyos eruption
