= Cerro Santiago =

Mountain in Guatemala

- Location within Guatemala

Highest point
- Elevation: 1,192 m (3,911 ft)
- Coordinates: 14°20′37″N 89°52′36″W

Geography
- Location: Jutiapa, Guatemala

Geology
- Mountain type: Volcanic field
- Volcanic arc: Central America Volcanic Arc
- Last eruption: unknown

Cerro Santiago is one of the most prominent cinder cones of a volcanic field surrounding the city of Jutiapa in southern Guatemala. Its elevation is 1,192 m (3,911 ft).

== See also ==
- List of volcanoes in Guatemala
