= Ixtepeque =

Volcán Ixtepeque
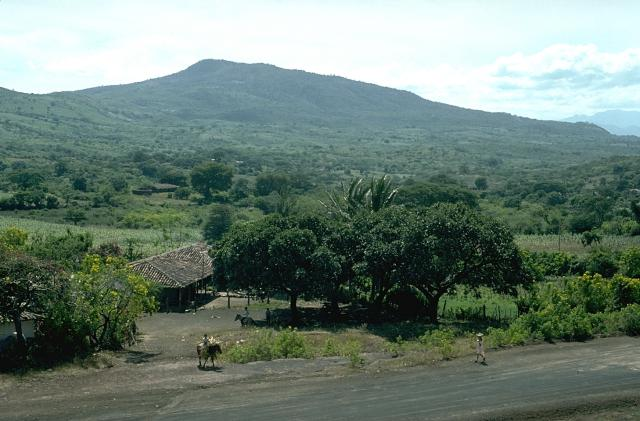

Highest point
- Elevation: 1,292 m (4,239 ft)
- Coordinates: 14°25′12″N 89°40′48″W

Geography
- Location within Guatemala
- Location: Jutiapa, Guatemala

Geology
- Mountain type: Stratovolcano
- Volcanic arc: Central America Volcanic Arc
- Last eruption: Holocene

Volcán Ixtepeque is a stratovolcano in southern Guatemala. The peak of the volcano lies at an altitude of 1,292 m (4,239 ft) above sea level. It consists of several rhyolitic lava domes and basaltic cinder cones. Its name is derived from the nahuatl word for obsidian. Ixtepeque was one of the most important obsidian sources in pre-Columbian Mesoamerica.

== See also ==
- List of volcanoes in Guatemala
