= Quezaltepeque (volcano) =

- Location within Guatemala

Highest point
- Elevation: 1,200 m (3,900 ft)
- Listing: Volcanoes in Guatemala
- Coordinates: 14°34′N 89°27′W

Naming
- Etymology: "at the quetzal feather hill" or "at the tall upstanding hill"
- Language of name: Nahuatl

Geography
- Location: Chiquimula, Guatemala

Geology
- Mountain type: Volcanic field
- Last eruption: Unknown

Quezaltepeque is a volcanic field in Chiquimula, Guatemala. It has erupted in the Holocene. It is an area of basaltic lava flows, which erupted from vents along a north–south trending fault without explosions, cutting through Tertiary pyroclastic rocks WNW of Ipala volcano about 5 km south of Quezaltepeque town. These basaltic flows issued passively from vents along a N-S-trending fault without accompanying explosive activity. There are mounds of lava over the vents.
