= Lake Atitlán =

Crater lake in Guatemala

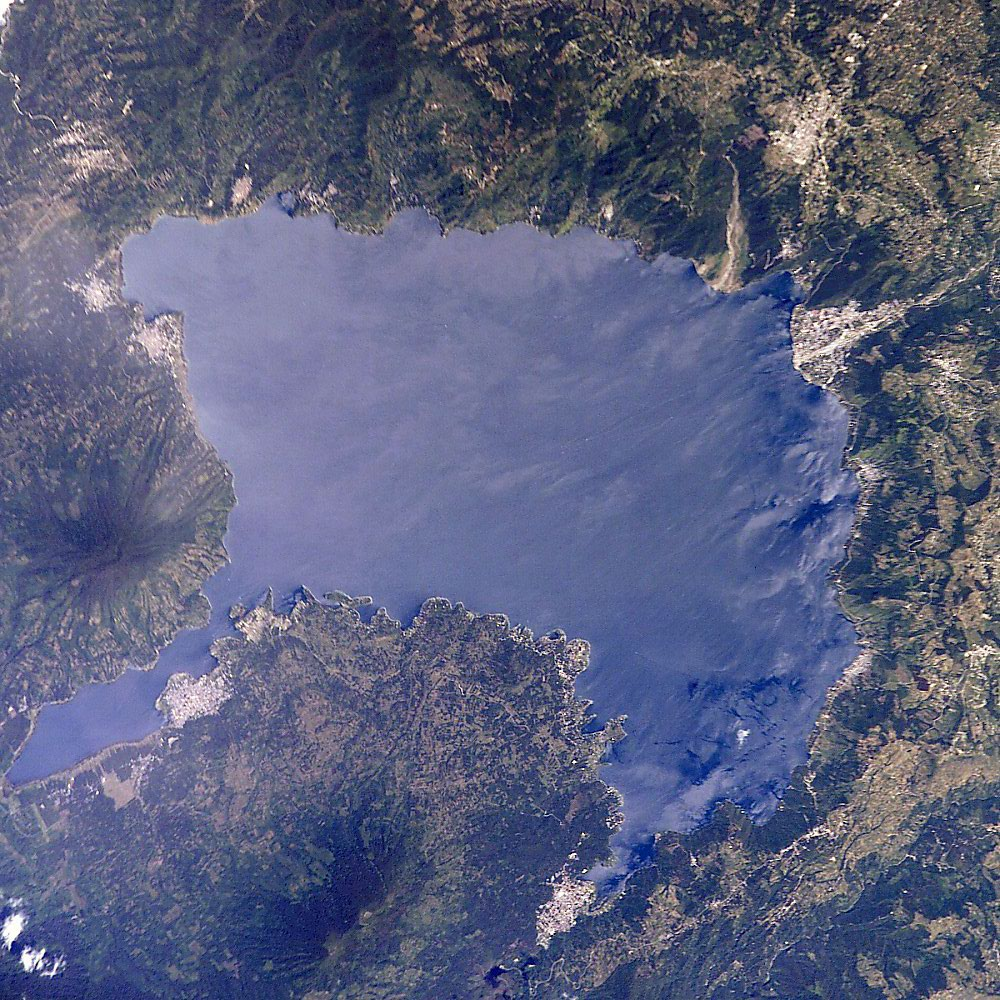
- Seen from the Space Shuttle. Volcán San Pedro is at the left of the image; Panajachel is the largest white patch along the upper right shore. North is at the top of the image.

- Location within Guatemala
- Interactive map of Lake Atitlán
- Location: Sololá Department
- Coordinates: 14°42′N 91°12′W
- Type: Crater lake, endorheic
- Basin countries: Guatemala
- Surface area: 130.1 km^{2} (50.2 sq mi)
- Average depth: 154 m (505 ft)
- Max. depth: 340 m (1,120 ft) (est.)
- Water volume: 20 km^{3} (16,000,000 acre⋅ft)
- Surface elevation: 1,562 m (5,125 ft)

Lake Atitlán (Spanish: Lago de Atitlán, [atiˈtlan]) is a large natural lake in the Guatemalan Highlands of the Sierra Madre mountain range. The lake is located in the Sololá Department of southwestern Guatemala. With a maximum depth of 340 metres (1,120 ft), it is the deepest lake in Central America.

== Name ==
Atitlán means "between the waters". In the Nahuatl language, atl is the word for water, and titlan means "between". The tl at the end of the word atl is dropped when the lexeme is combined with suffixes (because it is a grammatical suffix), to which is added the -ti- connector for certain adverbs, and the -tlan suffix which means "in between, beside, near", so that the combined elements form Atitlán.

== Geography ==
The lake has a maximum depth of about 340 metres (1,120 ft) and an average depth of 154 metres (505 ft). It is approximately 18 km × 8 km (11.2 mi × 5.0 mi) with a surface area of 130.1 km^{2} (50.2 sq mi), and contains around 20 km^{3} (4.8 cu mi) of water. Atitlán is an endorheic lake, fed by two nearby rivers and not draining into the ocean. It is shaped by deep surrounding escarpments and three volcanoes on its southern flank. The lake basin is volcanic in origin, filling an enormous caldera which was formed by a supervolcanic eruption approximately 79,500 years ago.

The culture of the towns and villages surrounding Lake Atitlán is deeply rooted in living Maya heritage, predominantly preserved by the Tz'utujil and Kaqchikel communities who maintain traditional textile arts, spiritual syncretism, and ancestral agricultural practices. The lake is about 50 kilometres (31 mi) west-northwest of Antigua. It should not be confused with the smaller Lake Amatitlán.

Lake Atitlán is renowned as one of the world's most beautiful lakes and is among Guatemala's most important national and international tourist attractions. German explorer and naturalist Alexander von Humboldt called it "the most beautiful lake in the world," and Aldous Huxley famously wrote of it in his 1934 travel book Beyond the Mexique Bay: "Lake Como, it seems to me, touches on the limit of permissibly picturesque, but Atitlán is Como with additional embellishments of several immense volcanoes. It really is too much of a good thing."

The area around San Marcos features particularly tall cliffs that abut the lake and, in recent years, has become renowned for cliff diving.

== Agriculture ==
The area supports extensive coffee and avocado orchards and a variety of farm crops, most notably corn and onions. Significant crops include corn, onions, beans, squash, tomatoes, cucumbers, garlic, chile verde, strawberries, and pitahaya fruit. The lake itself is a significant food source for the largely indigenous population.

== Geological history ==
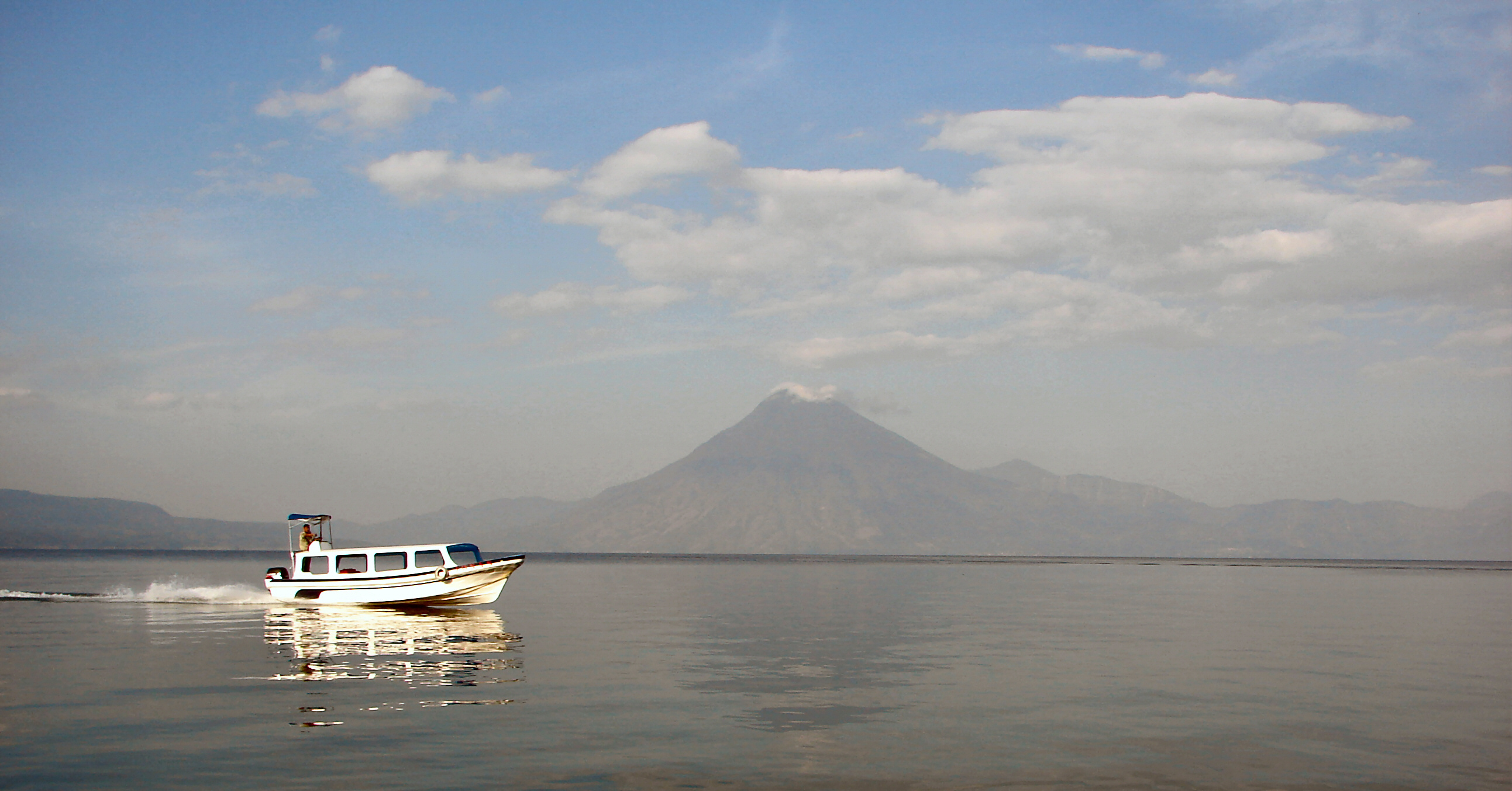
A view across Lake Atitlán from Panajachel to Volcán San Pedro

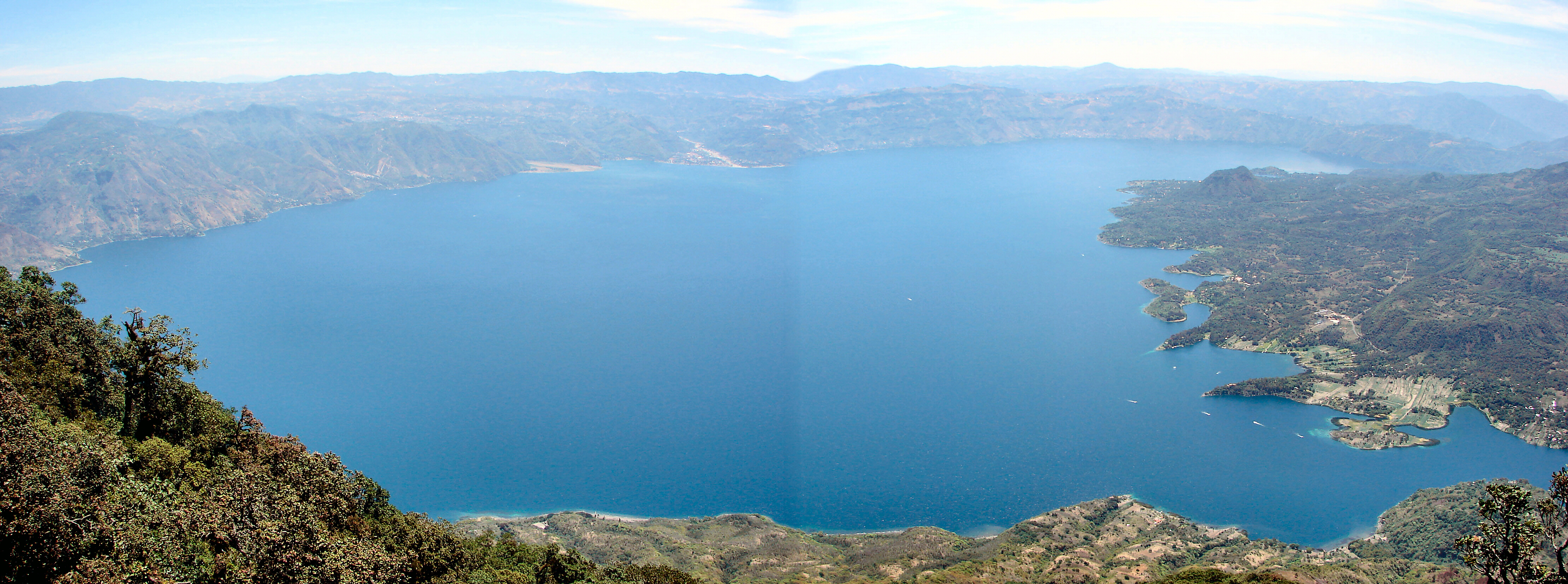
Panorama view of the lake as seen from the top of Volcán San Pedro, or from the left towards the right of the satellite photo on the top of this page

The first volcanic activity in the region occurred about 11 million years ago. Since then, the area has experienced four distinct episodes of volcanic growth and caldera collapse, the most recent of which began about 1.8 million years ago and culminated in the formation of the present-day caldera. The lake now fills a large part of the caldera, reaching depths of up to 340 m (1,120 ft).

The caldera-forming eruption is known as Los Chocoyos eruption and ejected up to 300 km^{3} (72 cu mi) of tephra. The enormous eruption dispersed ash over an area of some 6,000,000 square kilometres (2,300,000 sq mi): it has been detected from Florida to Ecuador, and can be used as a stratigraphic marker in both the Pacific and Atlantic oceans (known as Y-8 ash in marine deposits). A chocoyo is a type of bird which is often found nesting in the relatively soft ash layer.

Since the end of Los Chocoyos, continuing volcanic activity has built three volcanoes in the caldera. Volcán Atitlán lies on the southern rim of the caldera, while Volcán San Pedro and Volcán Tolimán lie within the caldera. San Pedro is the oldest of the three and appears to have ceased erupting approximately 40,000 years ago. Tolimán began growing after San Pedro ceased erupting and likely remains active, although it has not erupted historically. Atitlán has formed almost entirely in the last 10,000 years and remains active; its most recent eruption occurred in 1853.

On February 4, 1976, a massive earthquake (magnitude 7.5) struck Guatemala, killing more than 26,000 people. The earthquake fractured the lake bed and caused subsurface drainage from the lake, allowing the water level to drop two metres (6 ft 7 in) within one month.

== Ecological history ==
In 1955, the area around Lake Atitlán became a national park. The lake was largely unknown to the rest of the world, and Guatemala sought ways to increase tourism and boost the local economy. It was suggested by Pan American World Airways that stocking the lake with a fish prized by anglers would be a way to do just that. As a result, an exotic non-native species, the black bass, was introduced into the lake in 1958. The bass quickly adapted to its new environment, resulting in a marked change in the lake's species composition. The predatory bass caused the elimination of more than two-thirds of the native fish species in the lake and contributed to the extinction of the Atitlan grebe, a rare bird that lived only in the vicinity of Lake Atitlán.

A unique aspect of the climate is what is referred to as Xocomil (of the Kaqchickel language meaning "the wind that carried away sin"). This wind is common in the late morning and afternoon across the lake; it is attributed to warm winds from the Pacific meeting colder winds from the North. The winds can result in violent water turbulence, enough to capsize boats.

In August 2015, a thick bloom of algae known as Microcystis cyanobacteria reappeared in Lake Atitlan; the first significant occurrence was in 2009. Bureaucratic red tape has been blamed for the inaction to save the lake. If current activities continue unchecked, the toxification of the lake will make it unsuitable for human use.

== Culture ==
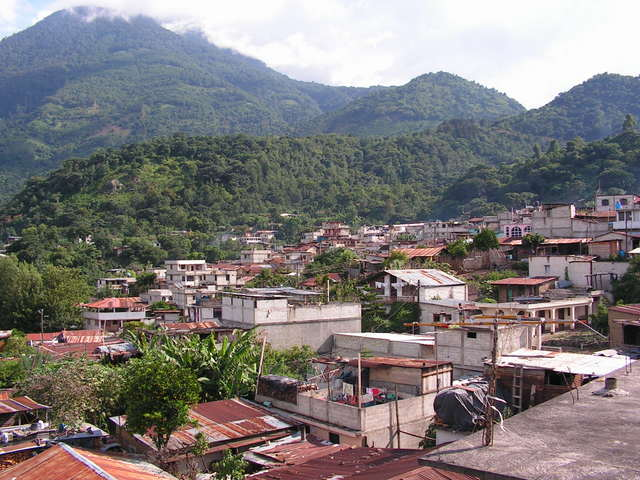
San Pedro la Laguna and Volcán San Pedro

The lake is surrounded by many villages in which Maya culture remains prevalent, and traditional dress is worn. The Maya people of Atitlán are predominantly Tz'utujil and Kaqchikel. During the Spanish conquest of the Americas, the Kaqchikel initially allied themselves with the invaders to defeat their historic enemies, the Tz'utujil and K'iche' Maya, but were themselves conquered and subdued when they refused to pay tribute to the Spanish.

Santiago Atitlán is the largest of the lakeside communities, and it is noted for its worship of Maximón, an idol formed by the fusion of traditional Mayan deities, Catholic saints, and conquistador legends. The institutionalized effigy of Maximón is under the control of a local religious brotherhood and resides in various houses of its membership during the course of a year, being most ceremonially moved in a grand procession during Semana Santa. Several towns in Guatemala have similar cults, most notably the cult of San Simón in Zunil.

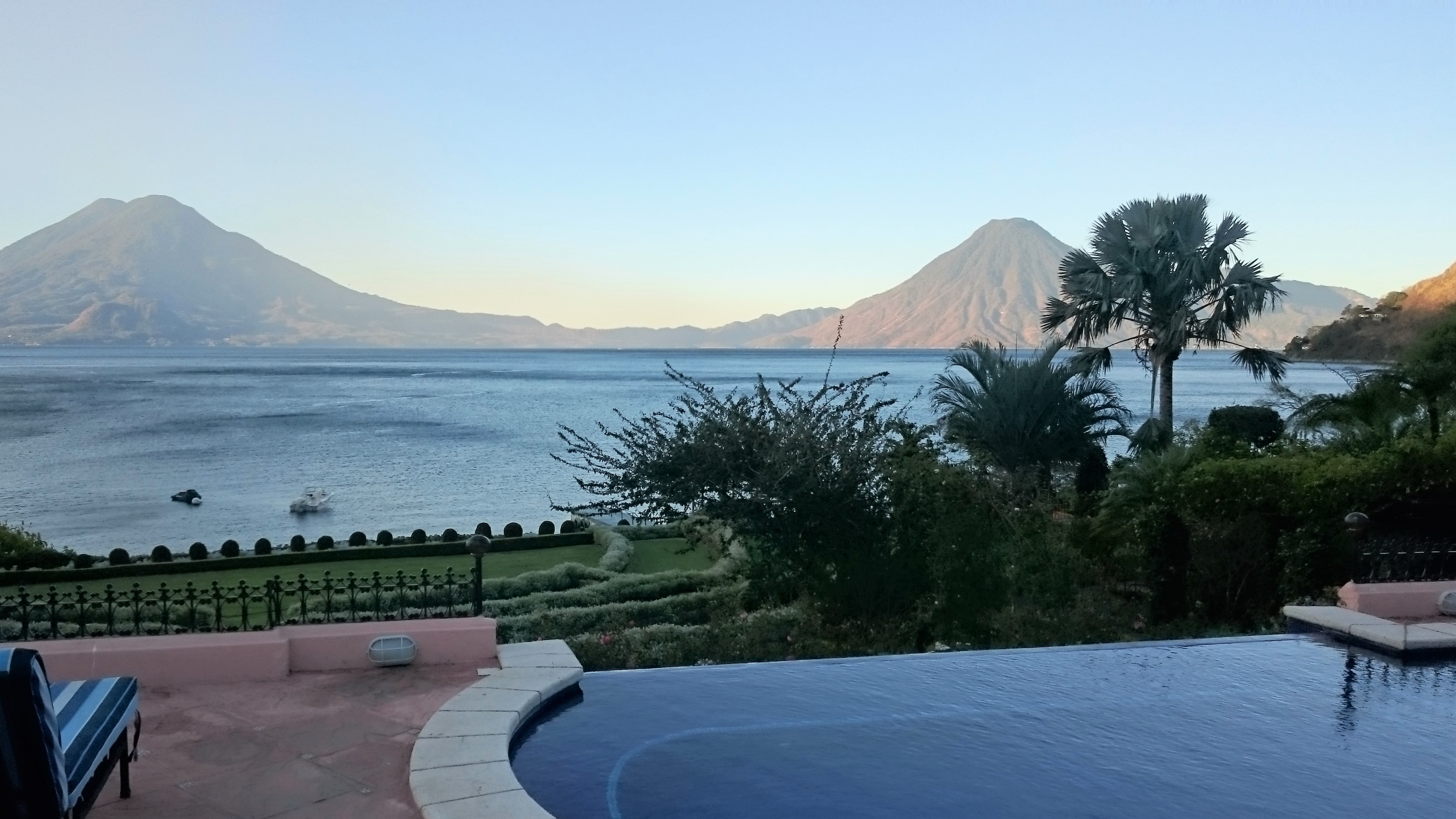
View from Hotel Atitlán near Panajachel

While Maya culture predominates in most lakeside communities, Panajachel has been increasingly dominated by Guatemalan and foreign tourists. It attracted many hippies in the 1960s, and although the civil war caused many foreigners to leave, the end of hostilities in 1996 saw visitor numbers boom again. The town's economy is almost entirely reliant on tourism today.

Several Mayan archeological sites have been found at the lake. Samabaj, located approximately 55 feet below the current lake level, appears to be from at least the pre-classic period. There are remains of multiple groups of buildings, including one particular group of large buildings that are believed to have been the city center.

A project titled "Underwater archeology in the Lake Atitlán. Samabaj 2003 Guatemala" was recently approved by the Government of Guatemala in cooperation with Fundación Albenga and the Lake Museum in Atitlán. Because of concerns about a private organization, such as the Lake Museum in Atitlán, the need to conduct an initial exploration of the inland waters of Guatemala was assessed.

No road circles the lake. Communities are reached by boat or roads from the mountains that may have brief extensions along the shore. Jaibalito can only be reached by boat. Santa Catarina Palopó and San Antonio Palopó are linked by road to Panajachel. Otherwise, the main towns are Santa Clara La Laguna, San Juan La Laguna, and San Pedro La Laguna in the west; Santiago Atitlán in the south; Cerro de Oro in the southeast; and San Lucas Tolimán in the east.

Recent studies indicate that a ceremonial site named Samabaj was located on an island about 500 metres (1,600 ft) long in Lake Atitlán. The site was revered for its striking connection to the Popol Wuj of the K'iche' Mayan peoples.

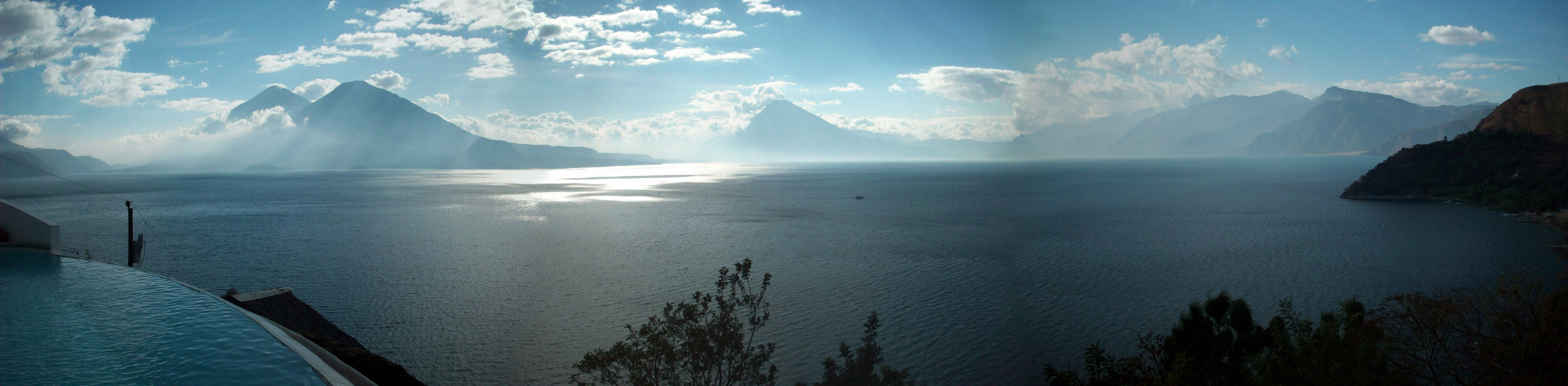
Lake Atitlán, from Tzam Poc Hotel near Santa Catarina Palopó

== Guatemalan civil war ==
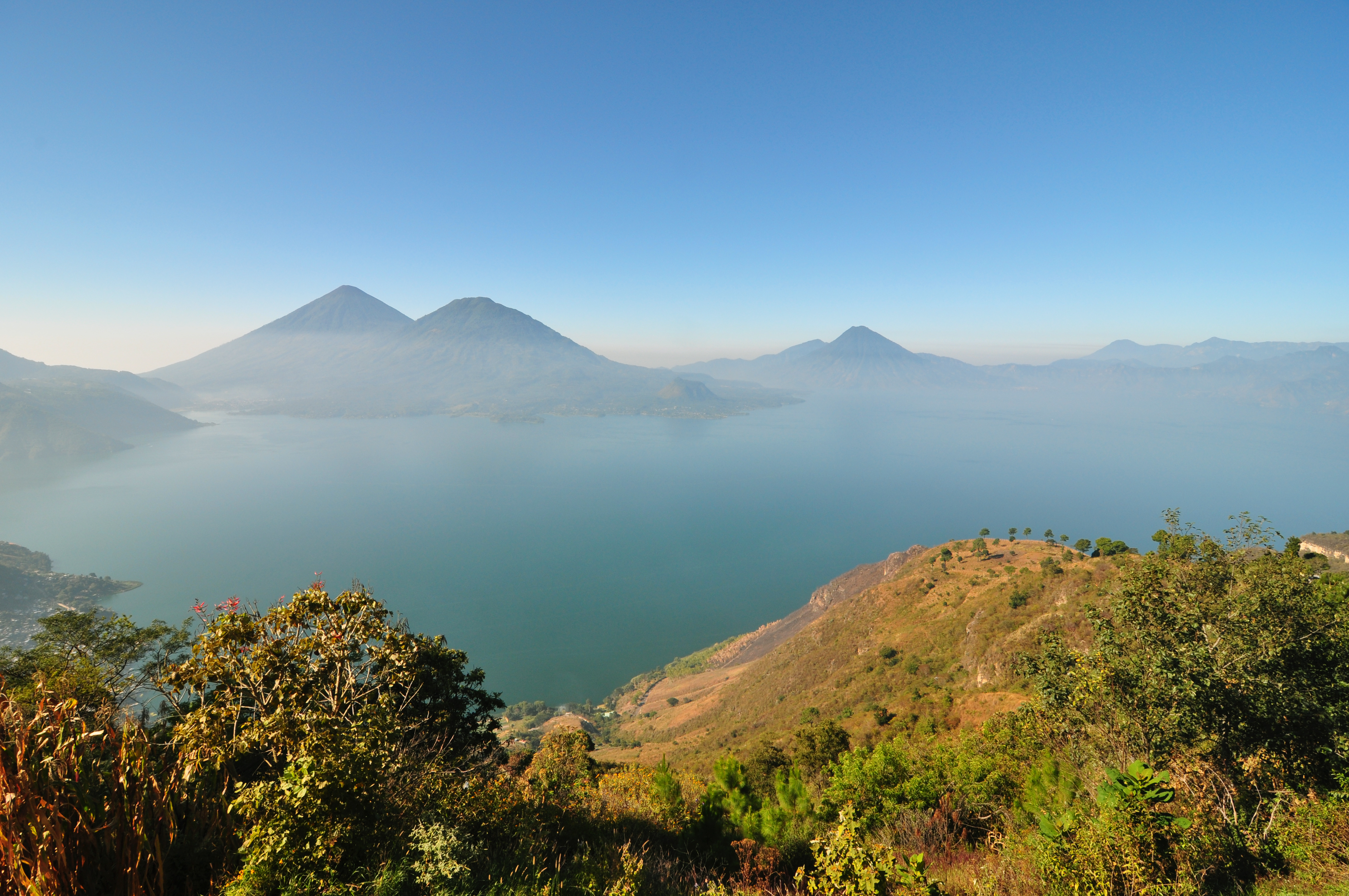
Aerial panoramic view of Lake Atitlán

During the Guatemalan Civil War (1960 - 1996), the lake was the scene of many terrible human rights abuses, as the government pursued a scorched earth policy. Indigenous people were assumed to be universally supportive of the guerrillas who were fighting against the government, and were targeted for brutal reprisals. Some believe that hundreds of Maya from Santiago Atitlán have disappeared during the conflict.

Two events of this era made international news. One was the assassination of Stanley Rother, a missionary from Oklahoma, in the church at Santiago Atitlán in 1981. In 1990, a spontaneous protest march to the army base on the edge of town was met by gunfire, resulting in the death of 11 unarmed civilians. International pressure forced the Guatemalan government to close the base and declare Santiago Atitlán a "military-free zone". The memorial commemorating the massacre was damaged in the 2005 mudslide.

== Hurricane ==
Torrential rains from Hurricane Stan caused extensive damage throughout Guatemala in early October 2005, particularly around Lake Atitlán. A massive landslide buried the lakeside village of Panabaj, causing the death of as many as 1,400 residents, leaving 5,000 homeless, and many bodies buried under tonnes of earth. Following this event, Diego Esquina Mendoza, the mayor of Santiago Atitlán, declared the community a mass gravesite: "Those buried by the mudslide may never be rescued. Here they will stay buried, under five meters of mud. Panabáj is now a cemetery."

Four and a half years after Hurricane Stan, Tropical Storm Agatha dropped even more rainfall, causing extensive damage to the region resulting in dozens of deaths between San Lucas Tolimán and San Antonio Palopó. Since then, roads have been reopened, and travel to the region has returned to normal.

== Gallery ==
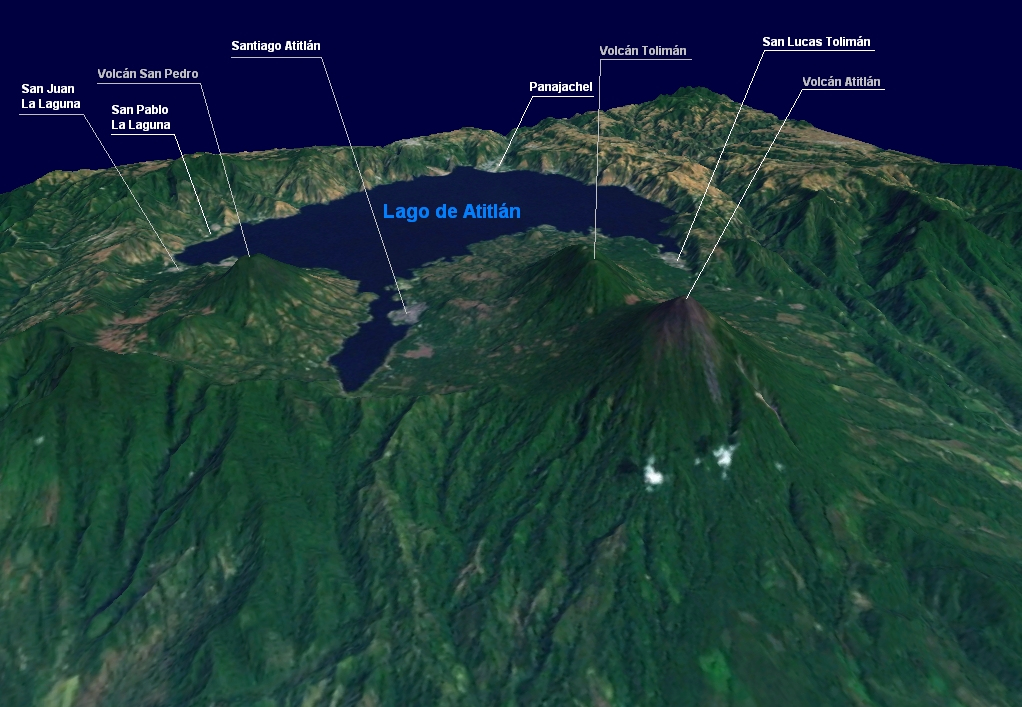
Volcano Atitlan, San Pedro, Toliman & Lago Atitlan isometric view

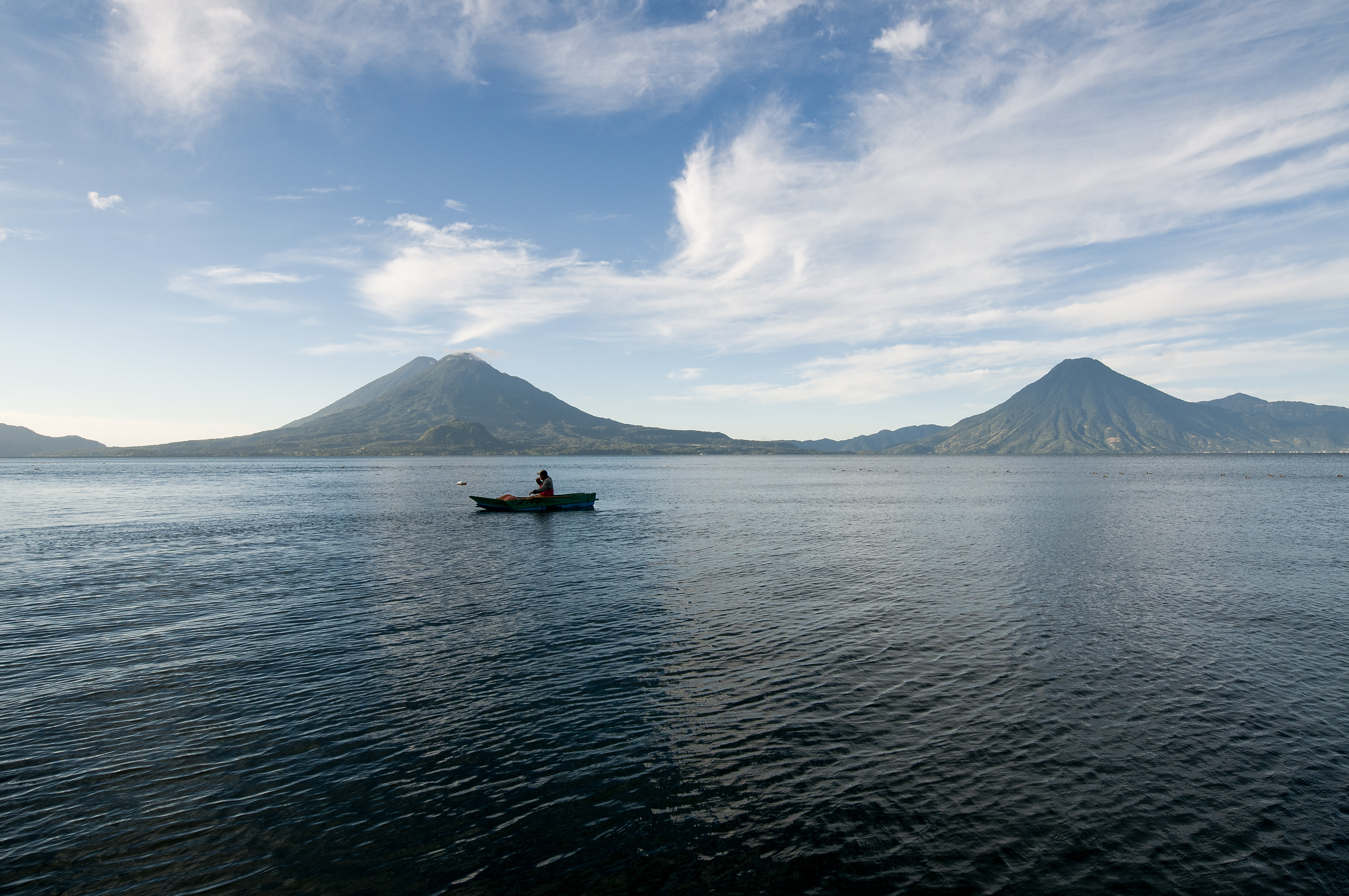
Another view from the Lake

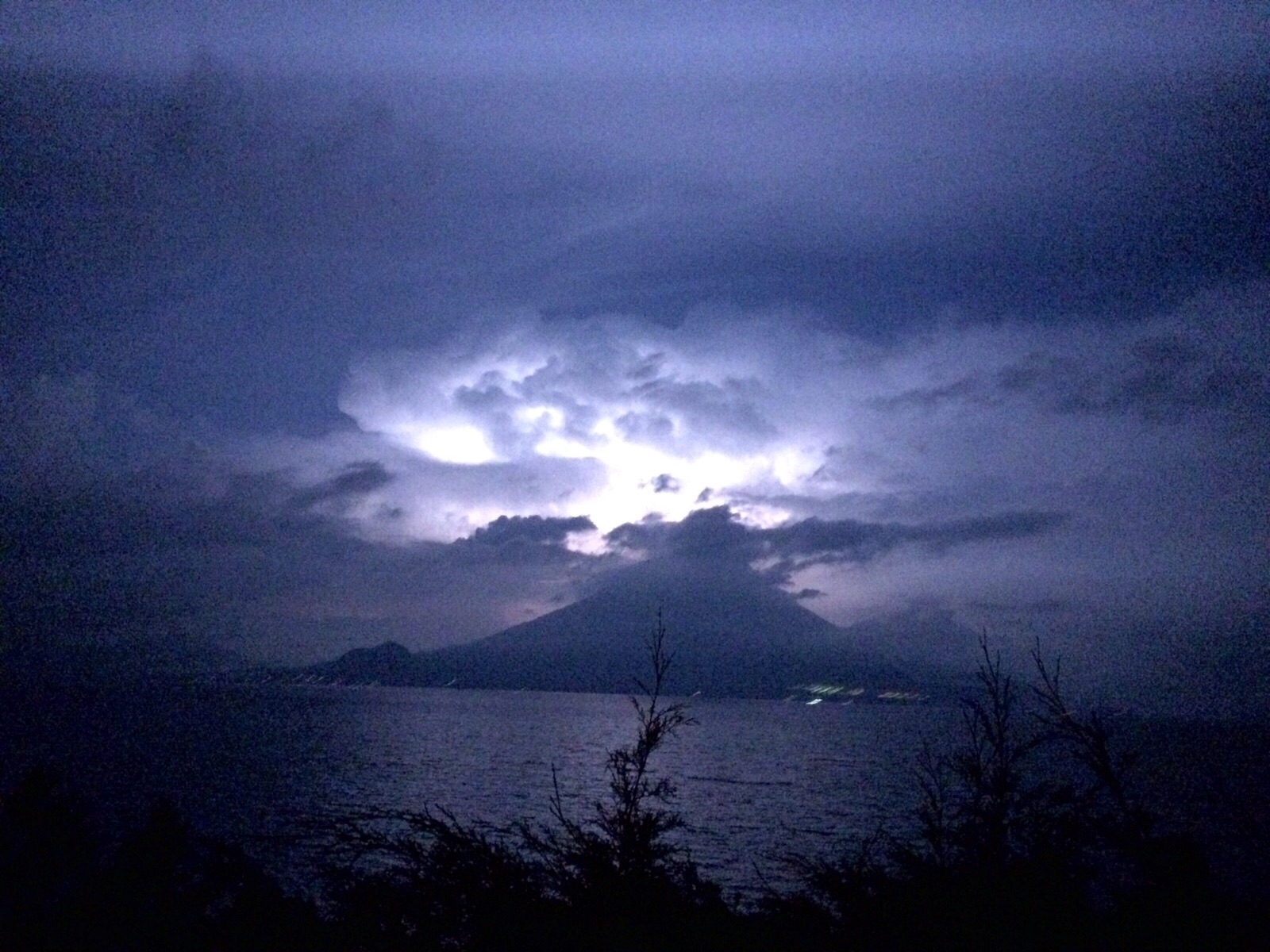
Storm over San Pedro volcano, 2015

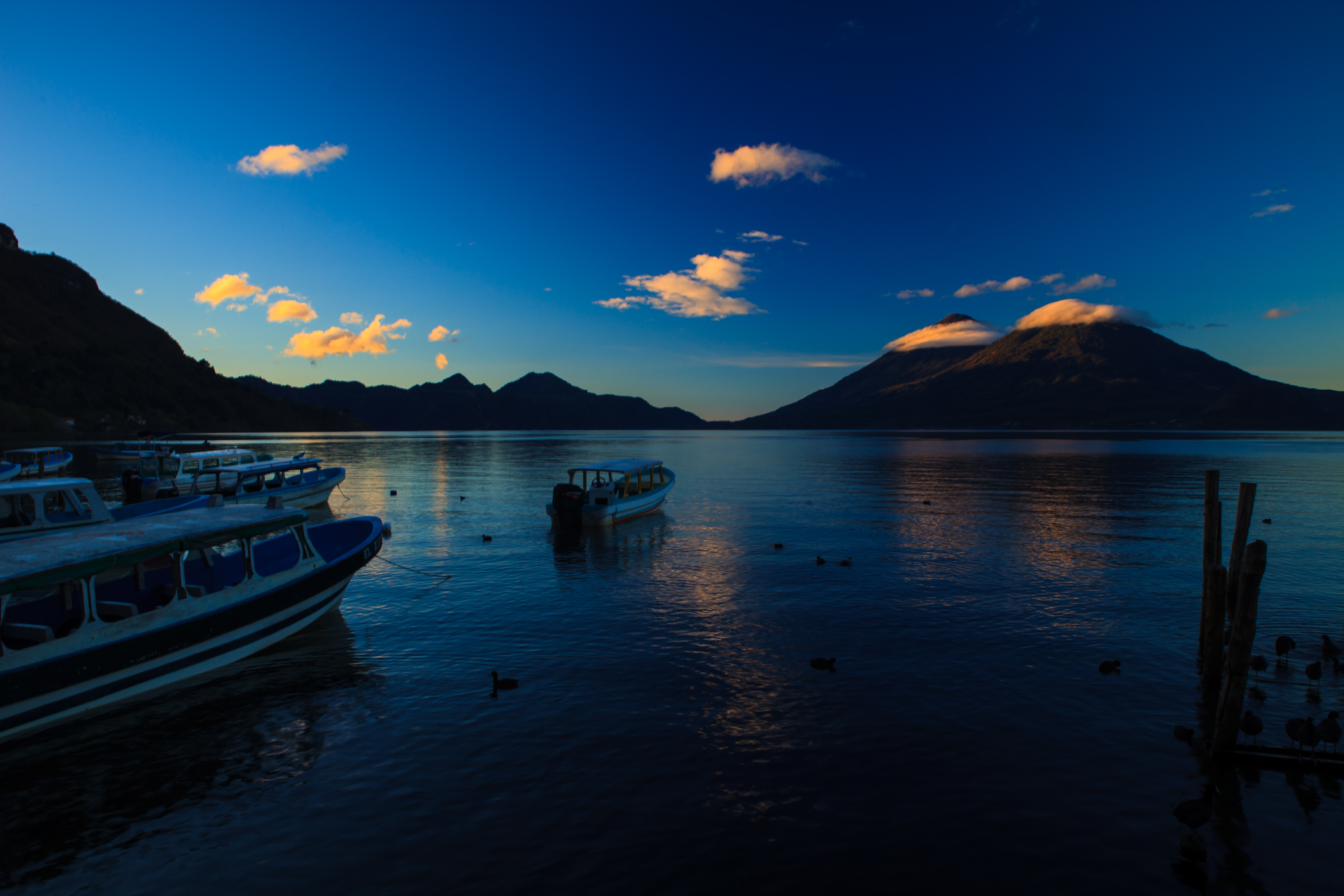
Sunrise at Lake Atitlán, Guatemala

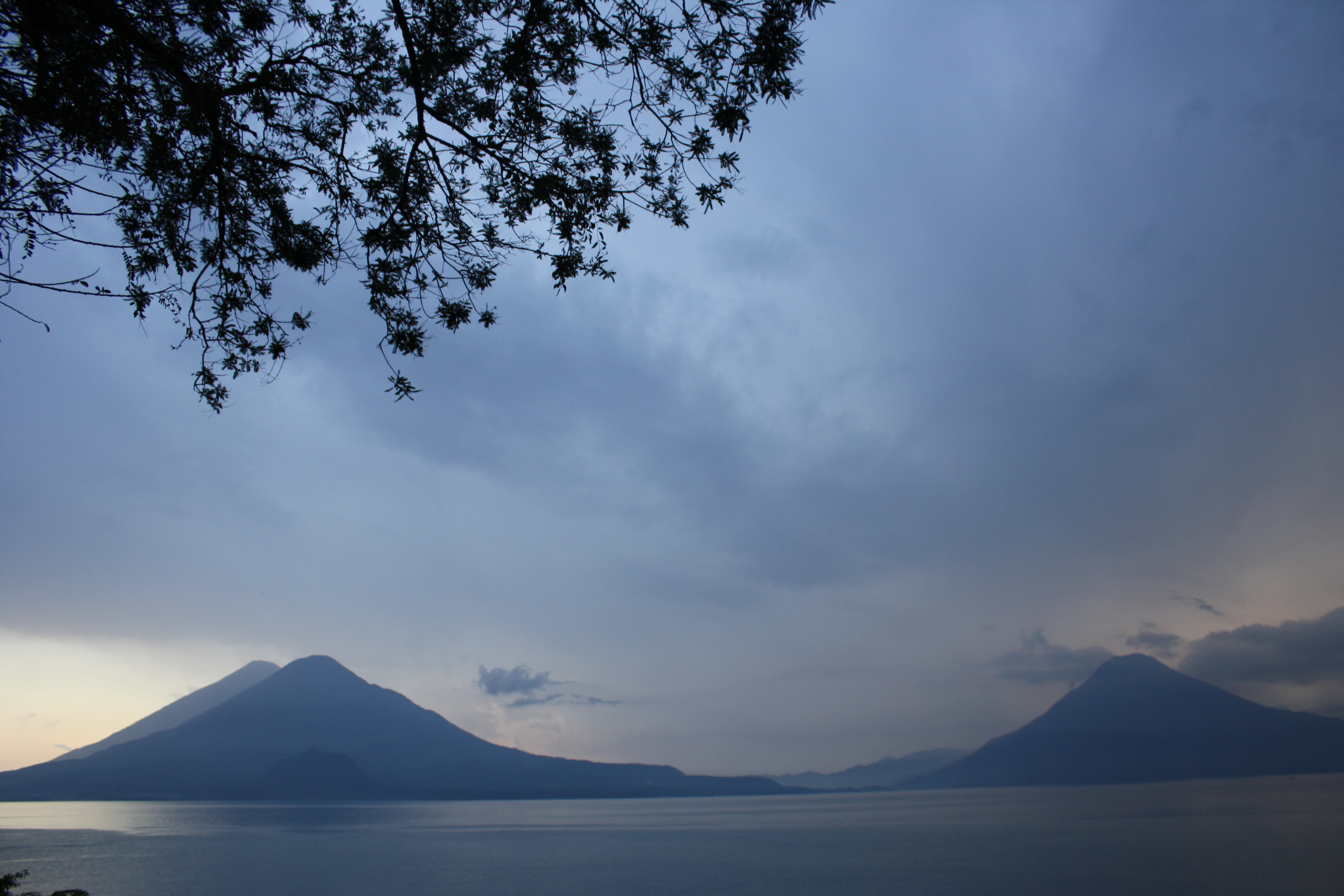
Volcanoes of Lake Atitlan

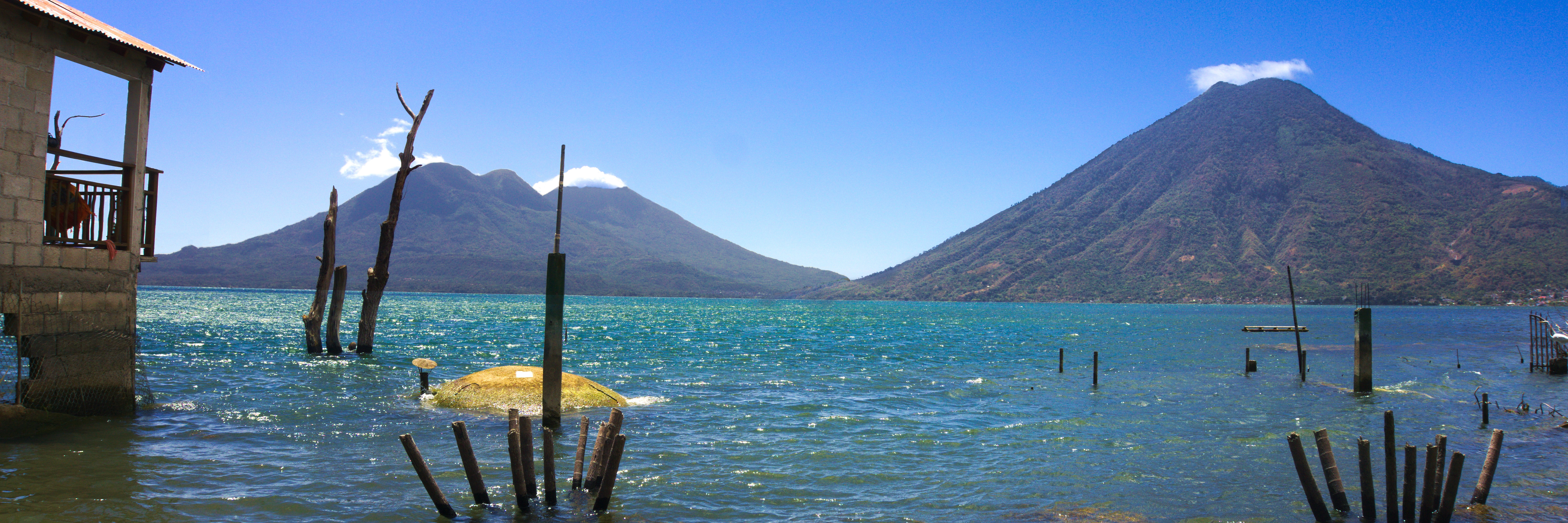
Lake Atitlán, seen from San Marcos, Guatemala

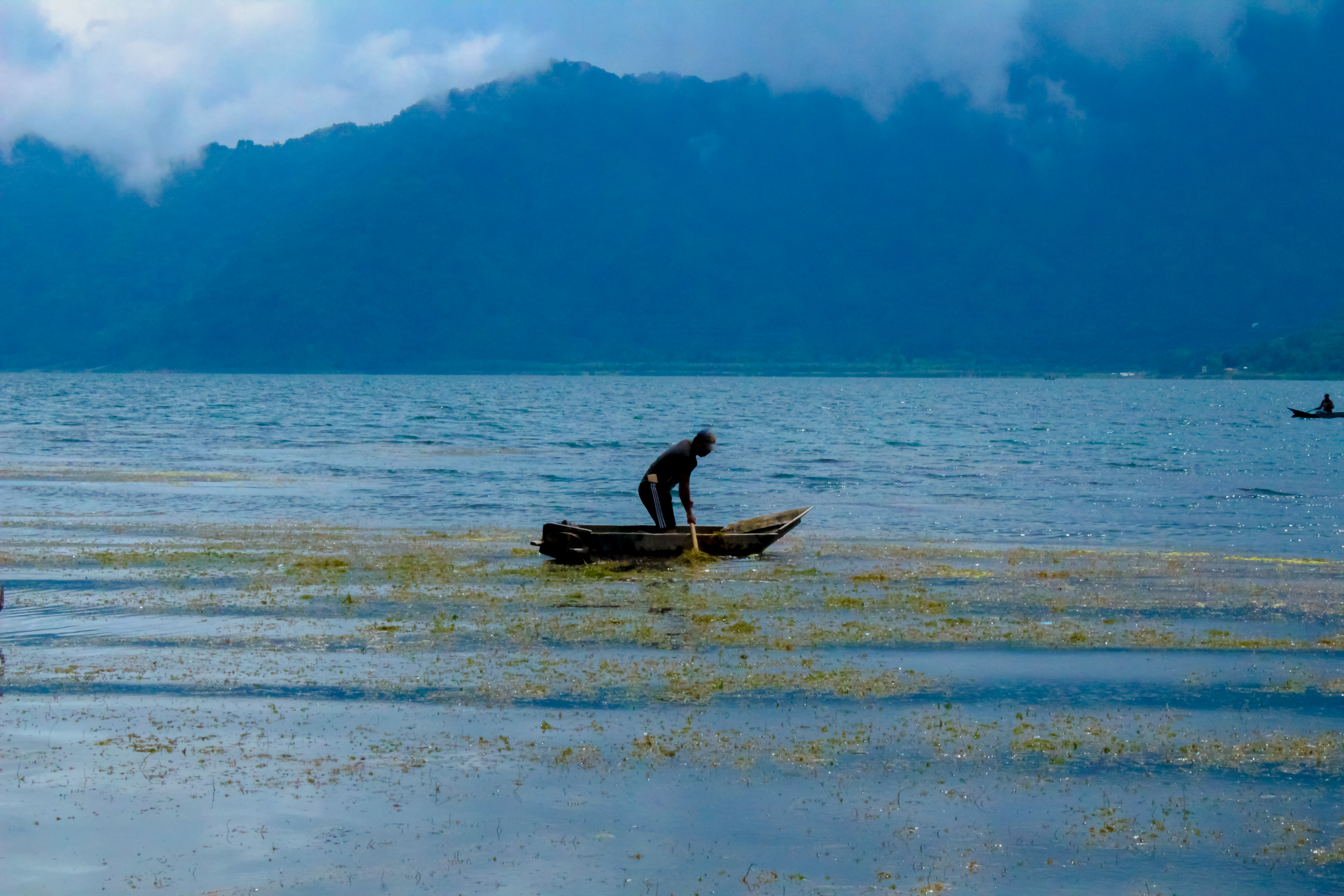
Fisherman in Lake Atitlán

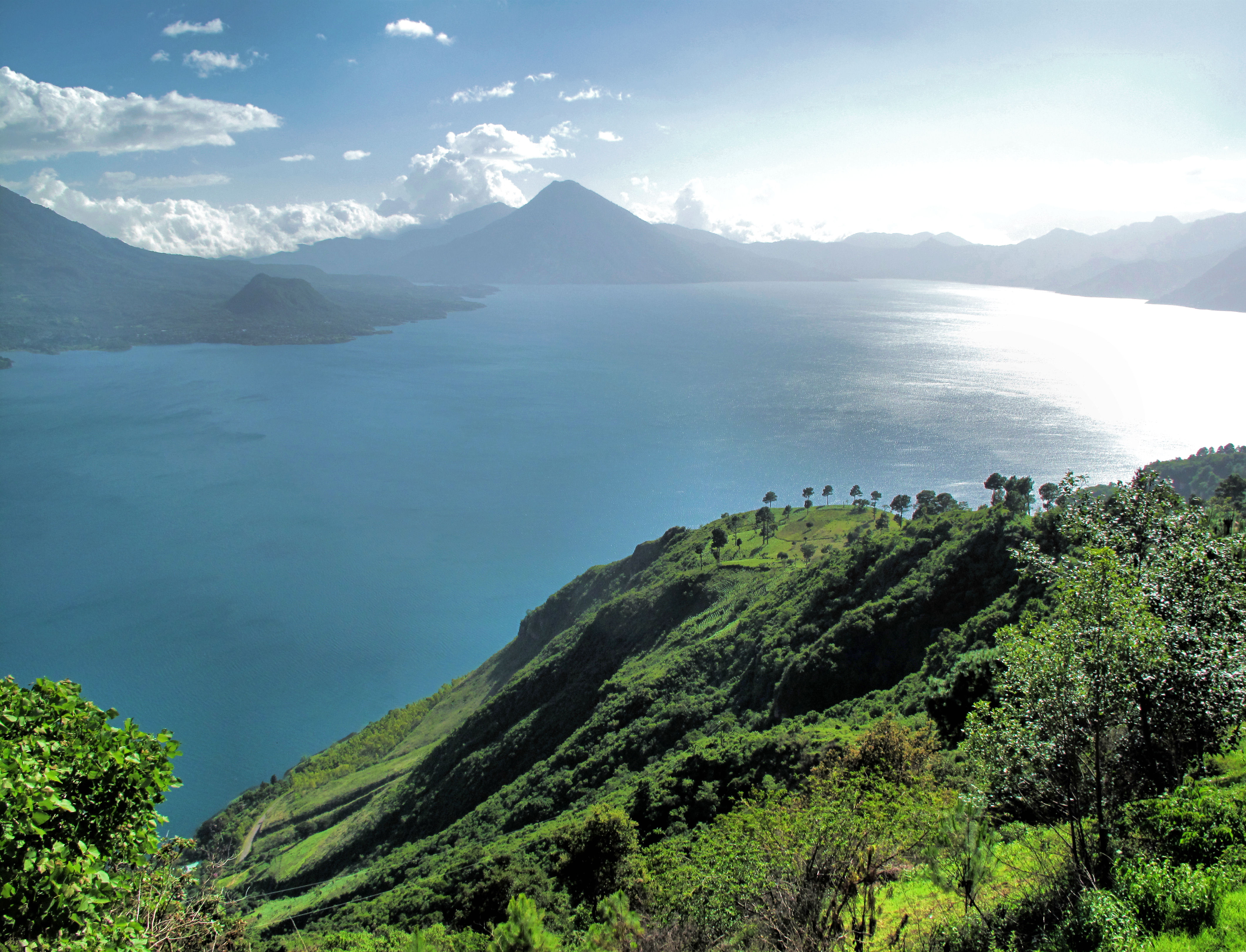
Lake Atitlán and volcanoes

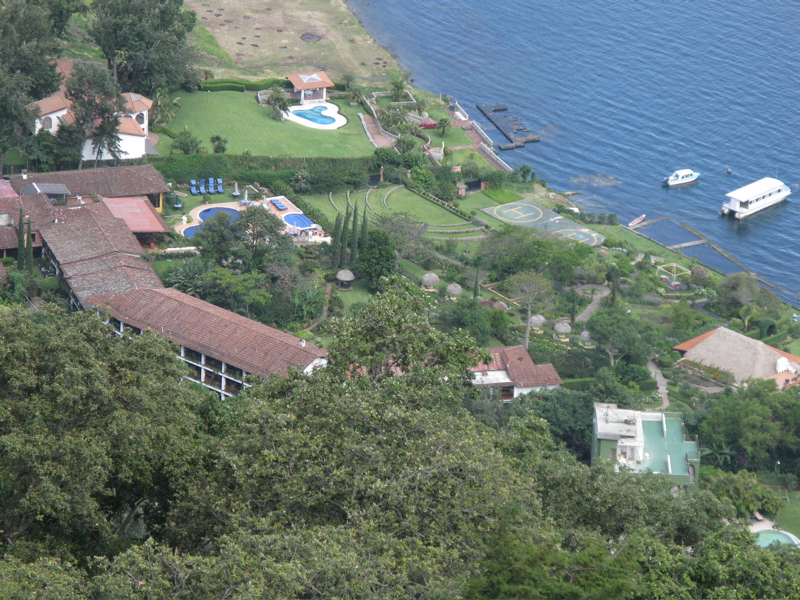
Hotel on the shores of Lake Atitlán, Guatemala

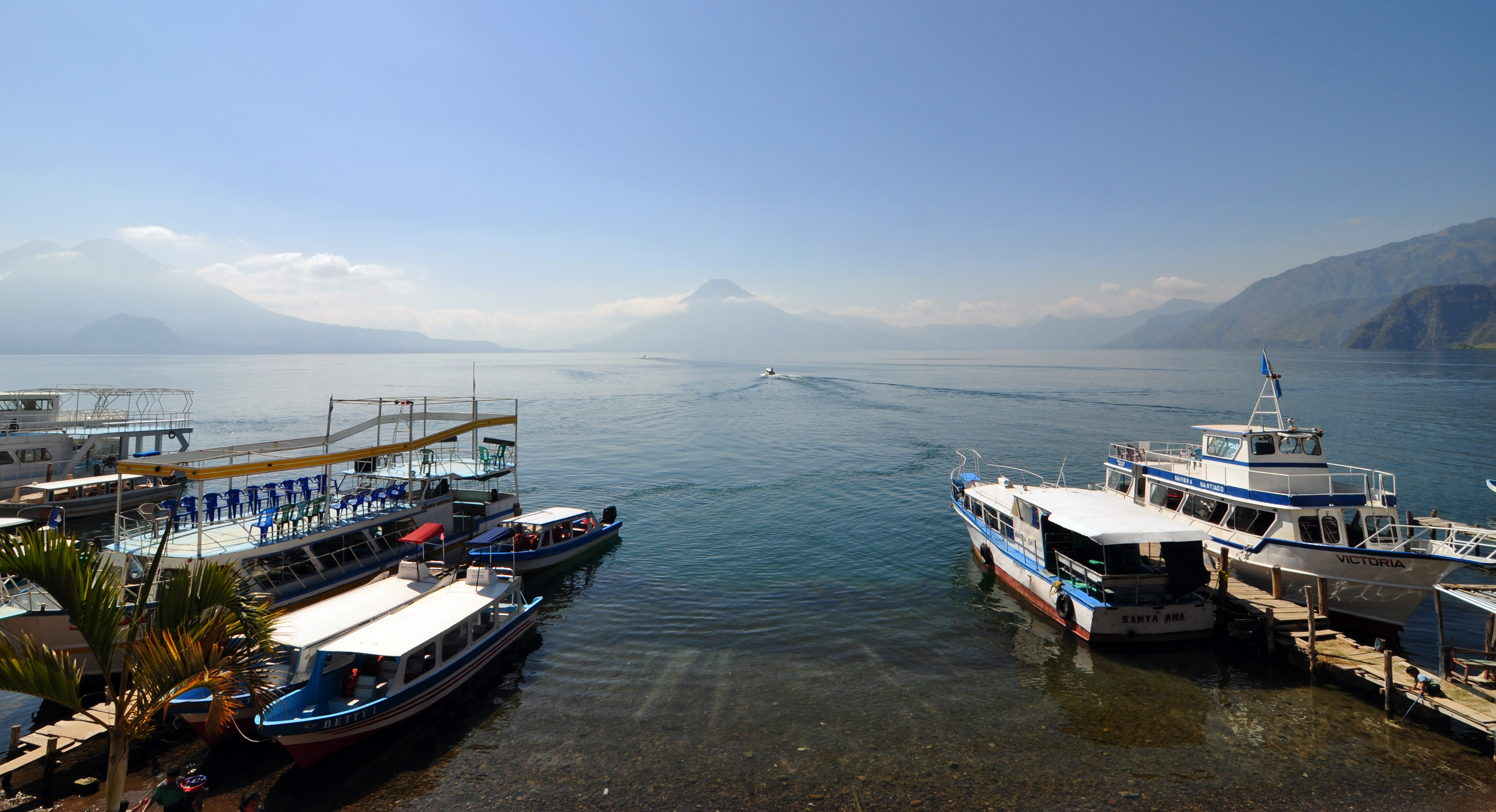
Panajachel

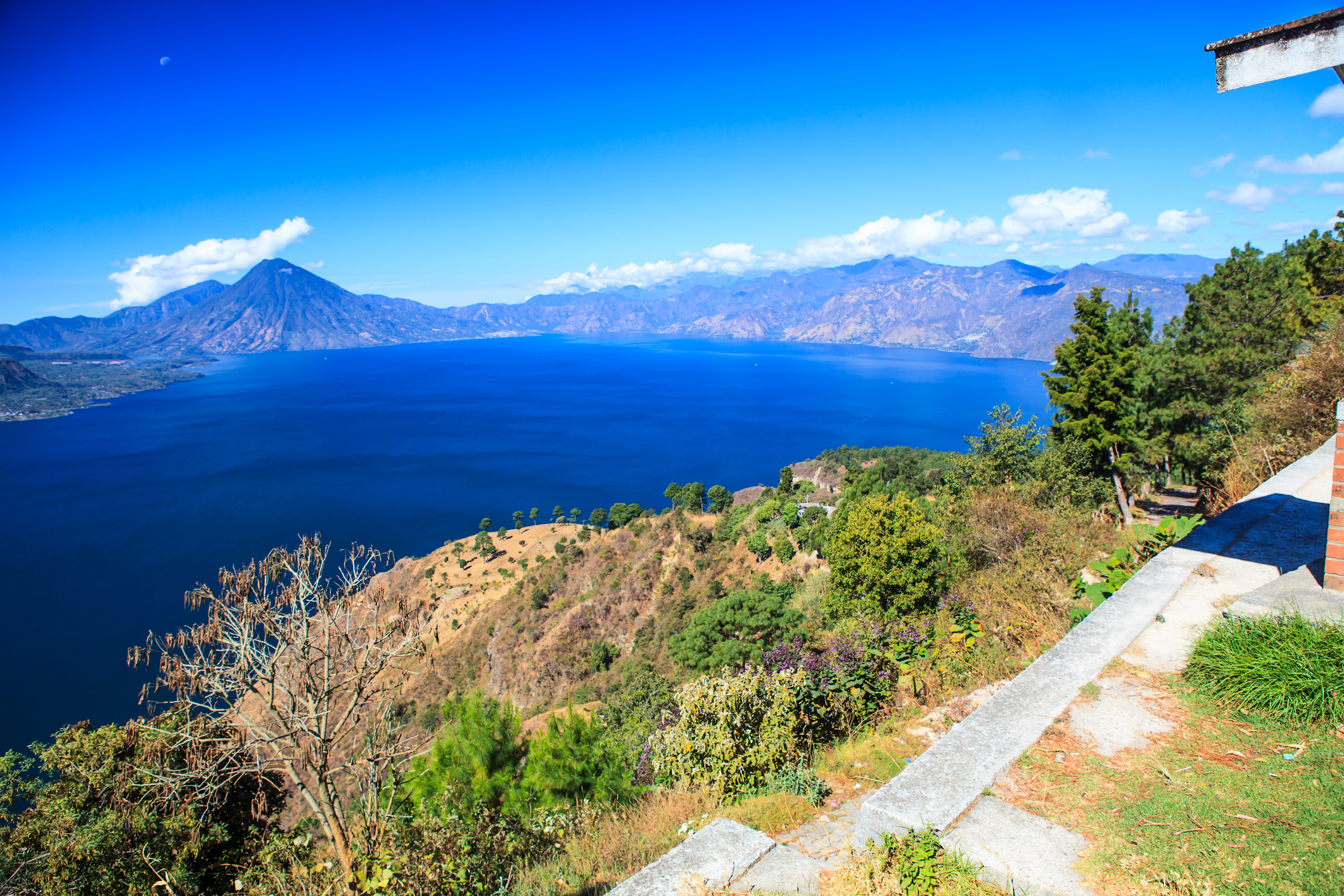
Lake Atitlan & volcanoes from the East

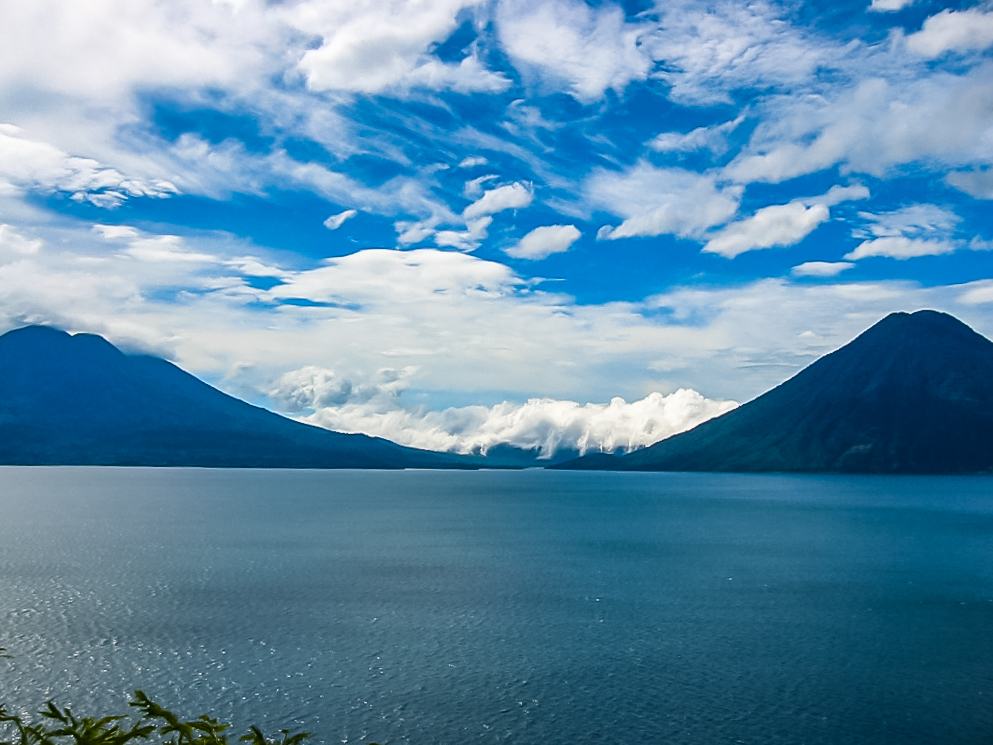
Clouds, mountains, lakes

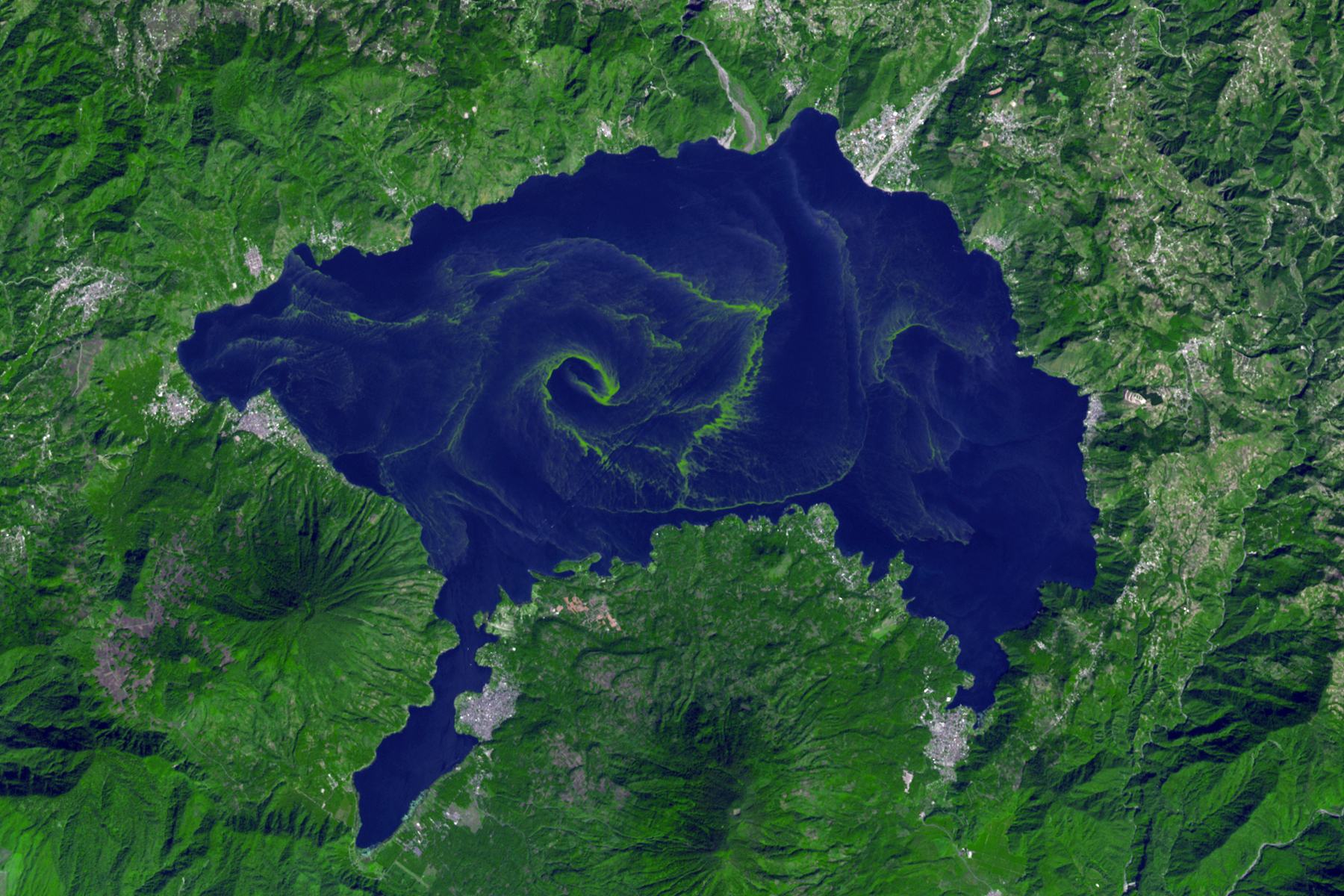
A harmful bloom of cyanobacteria (blue-green algae) spread across the lake (false color image)

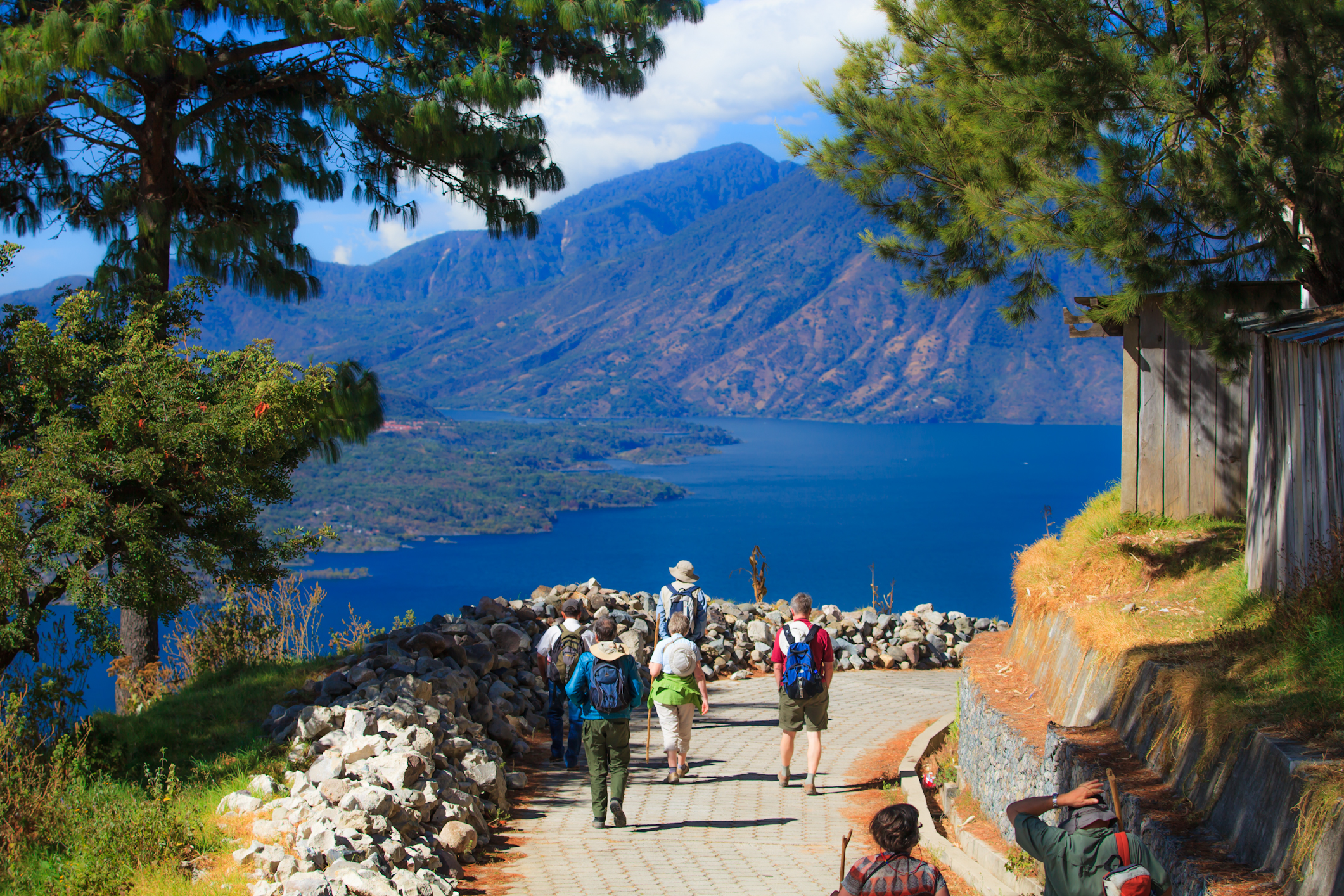
Hike down from the east rim to Lake Atitlán

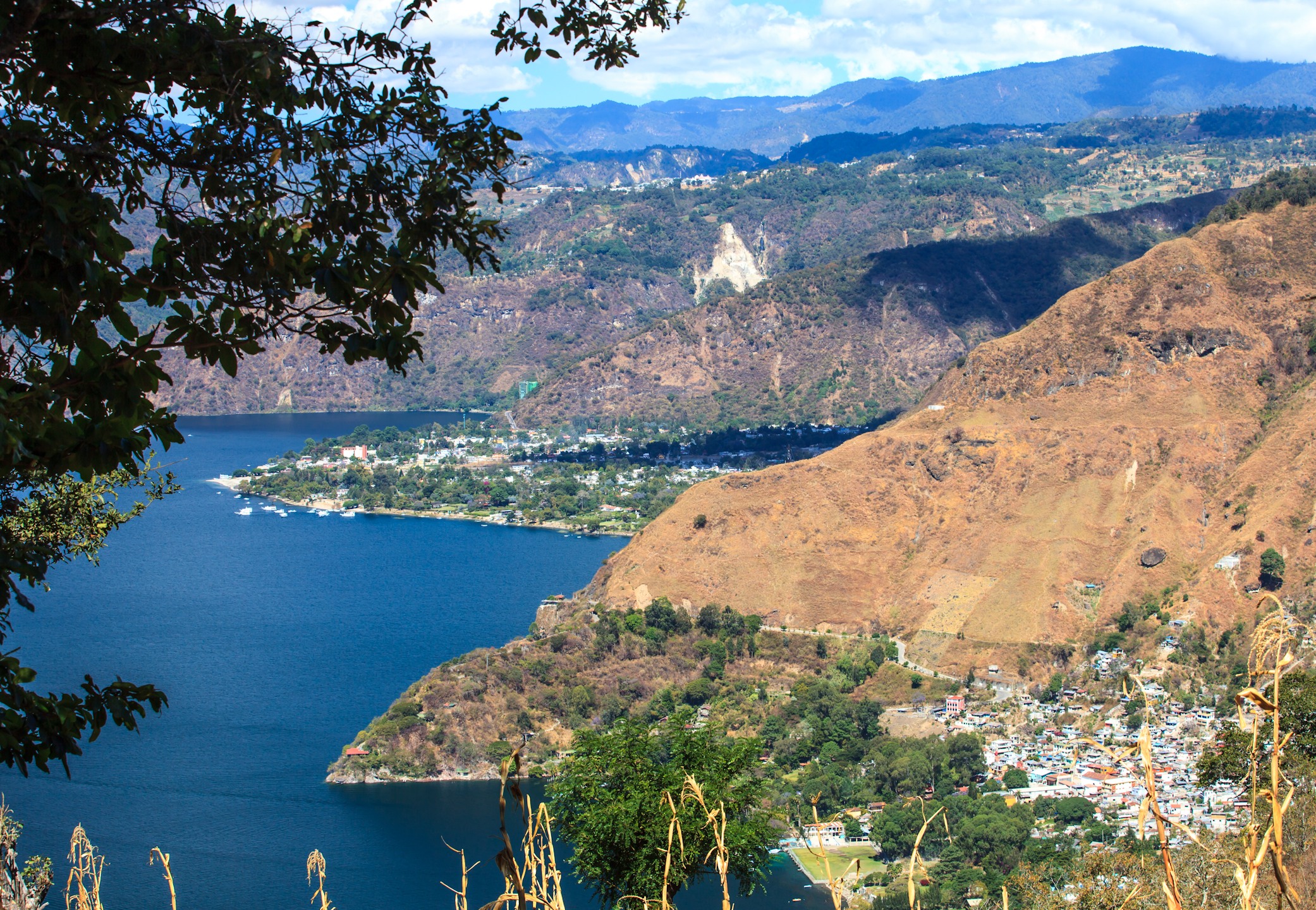
Hike down from the east rim to Lake Atitlán-Panajachel

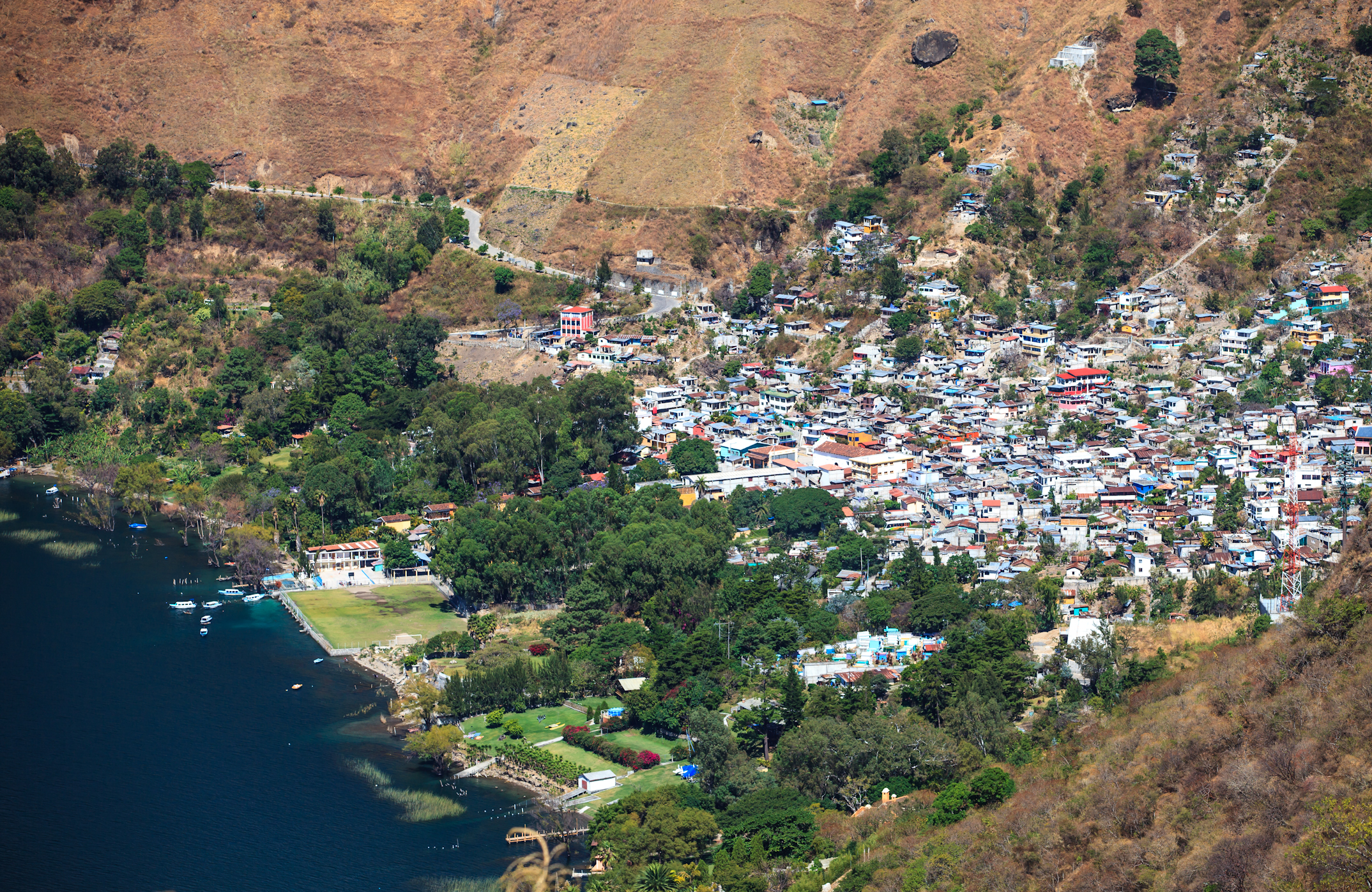
Hike down from the east rim to Lake Atitlán-Panajachel

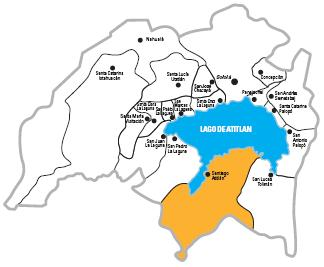
Santiago Atitlán map

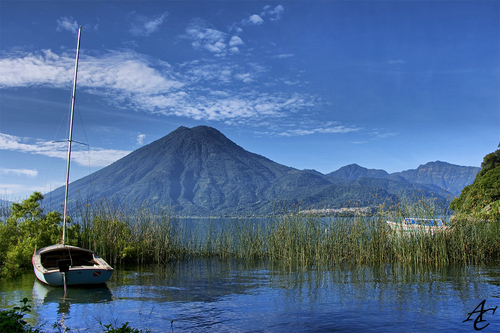
Lake Atitlán Guatemala

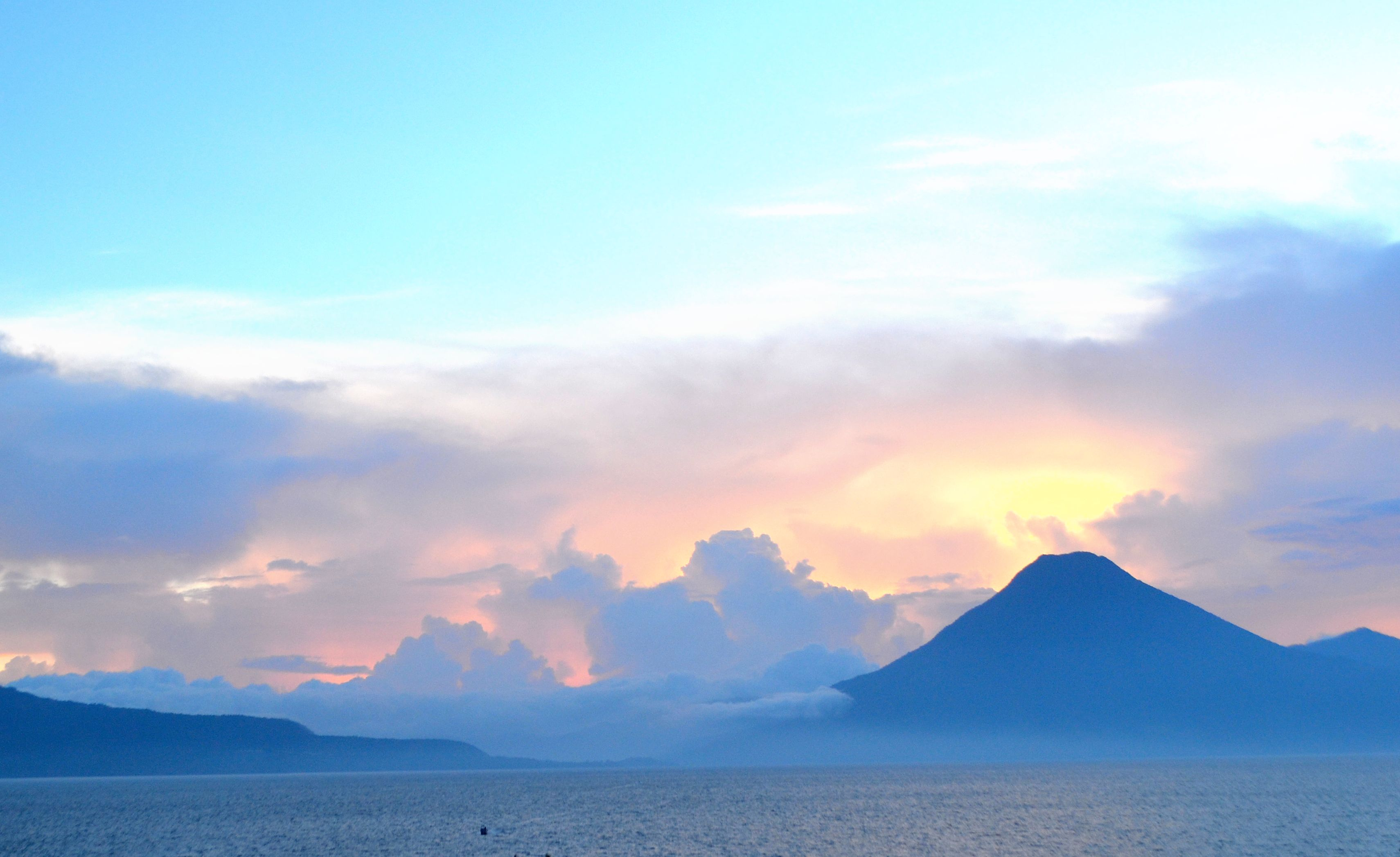
Panorama of Lake Atitlán, Guatemala

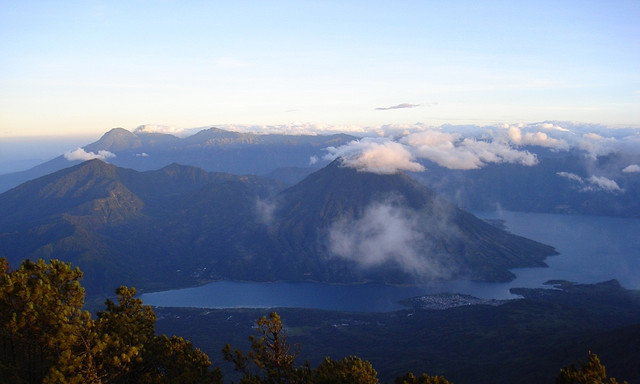
Volcanoes near Lake Atitlán

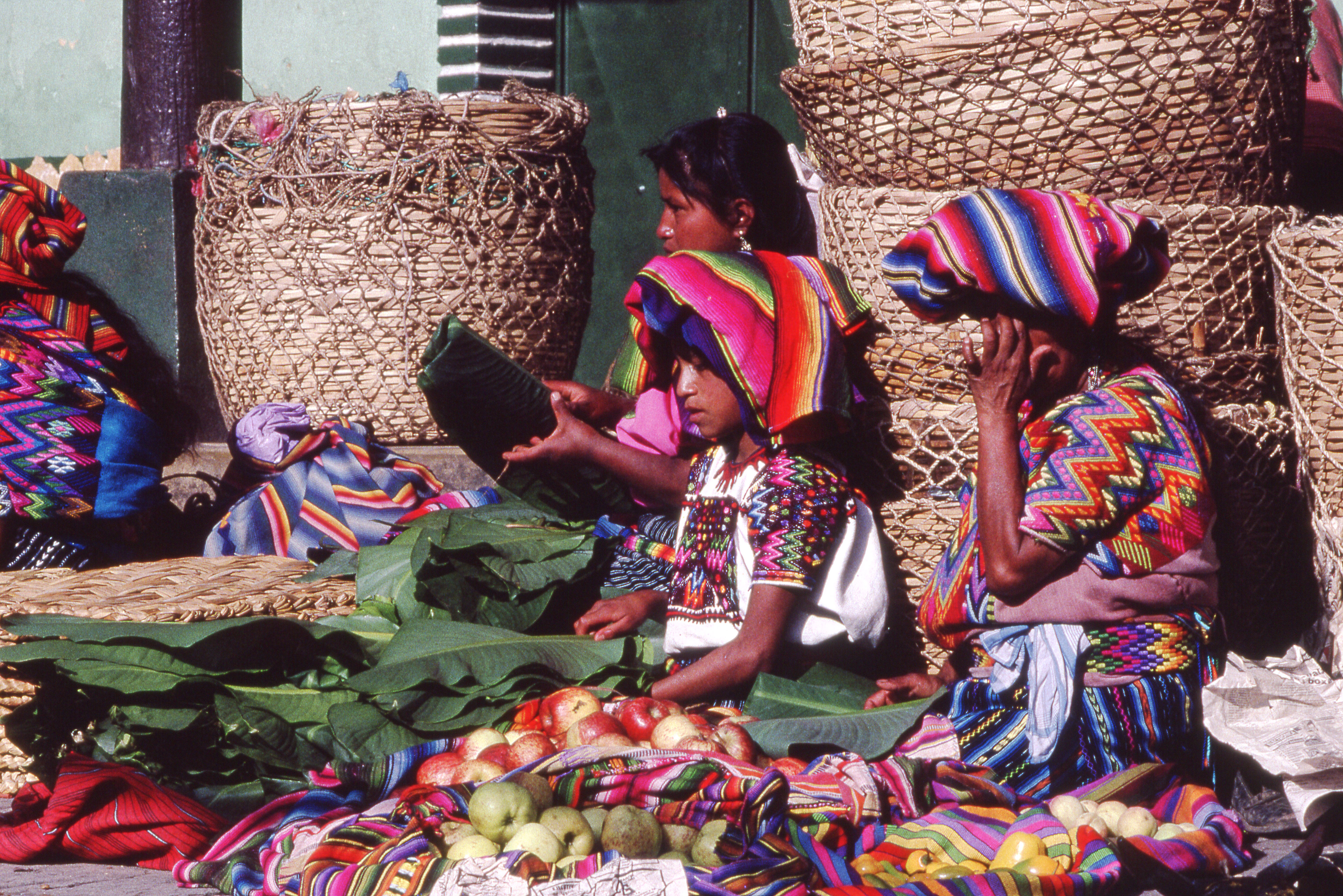
Indigenous people near Lake Atitlán

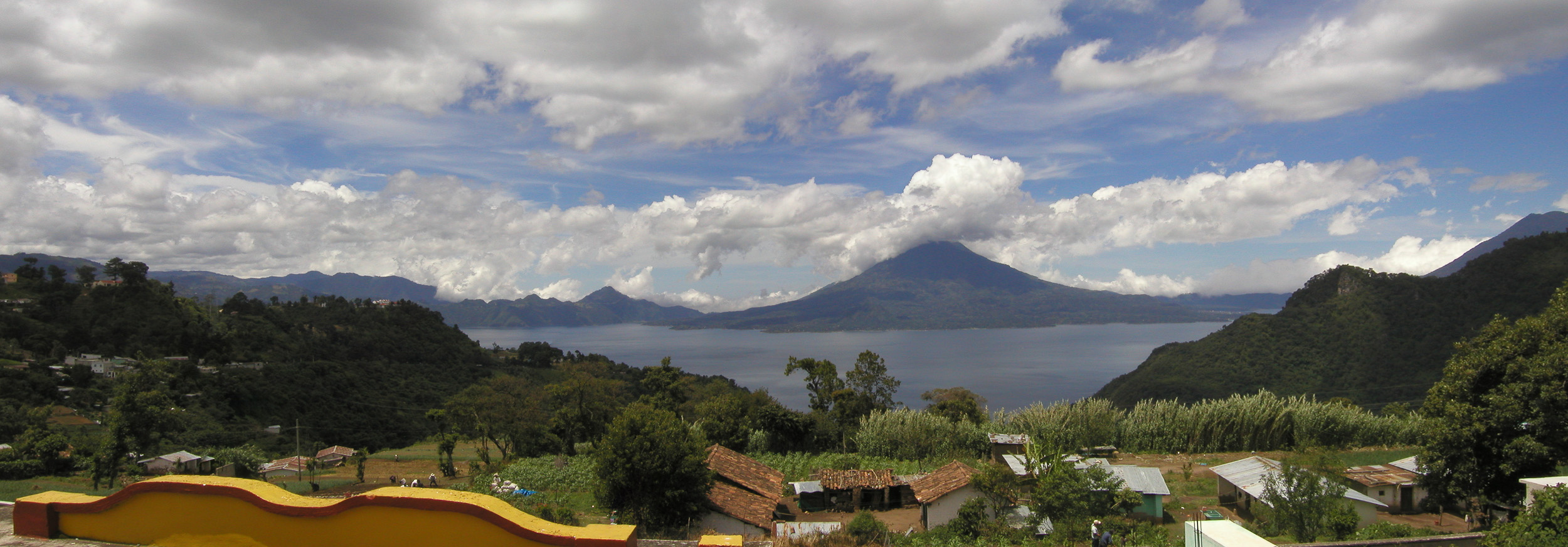
Sololá

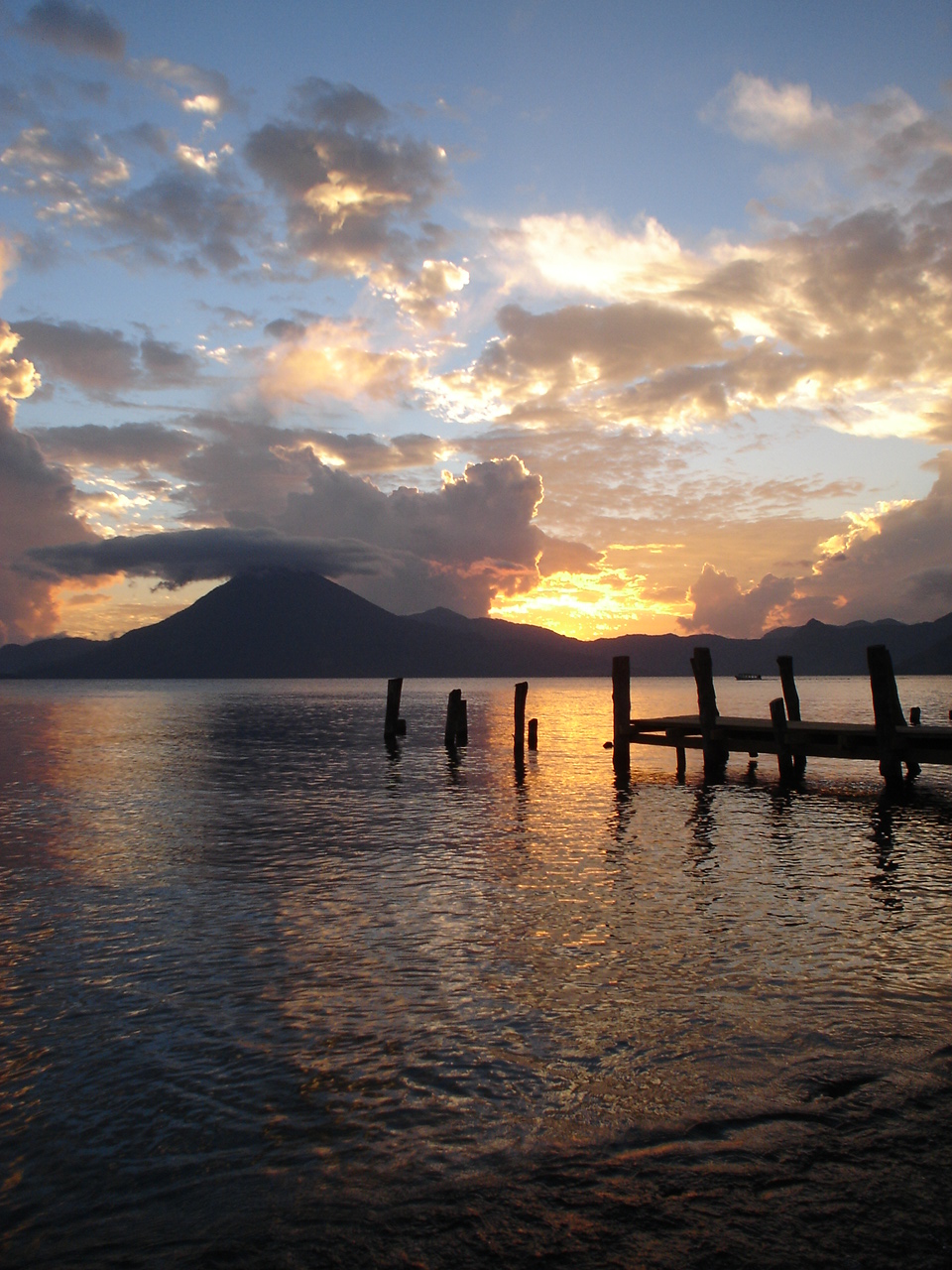
Sunset in Panjachel

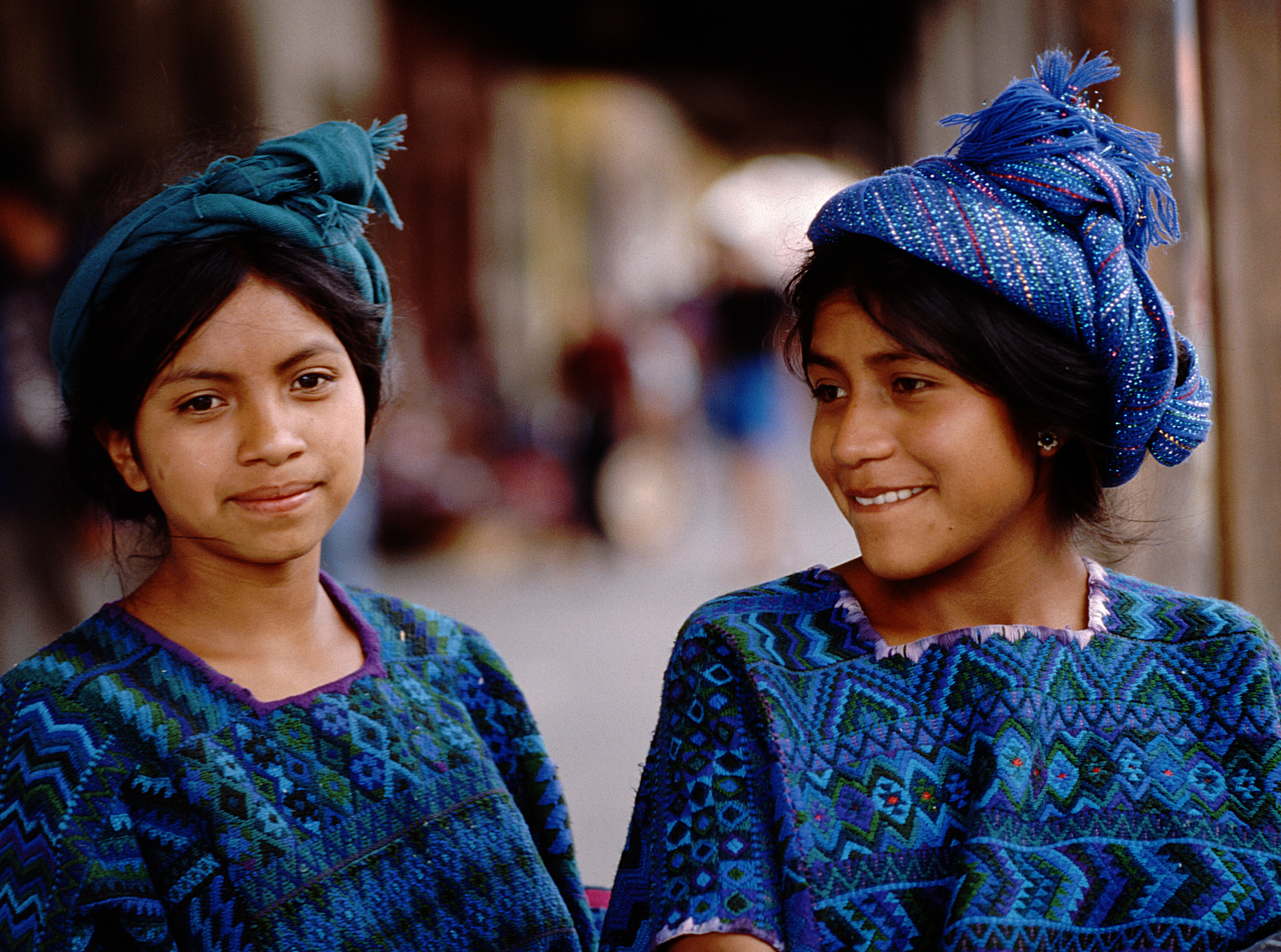
Mayan girls in Chichicastenango, their clothing indicates they are from Santa Catarina Palopó

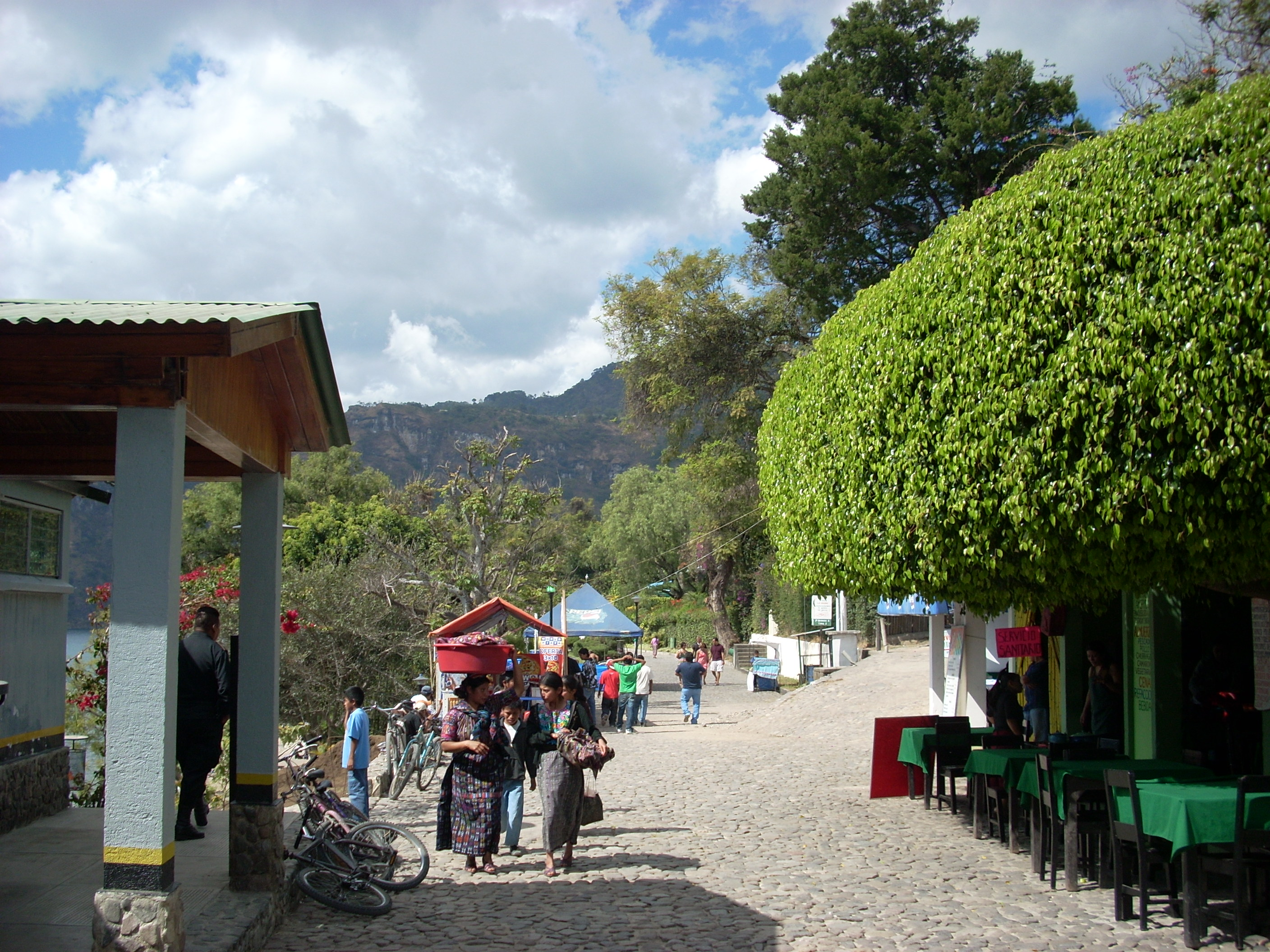
Panajachel shore

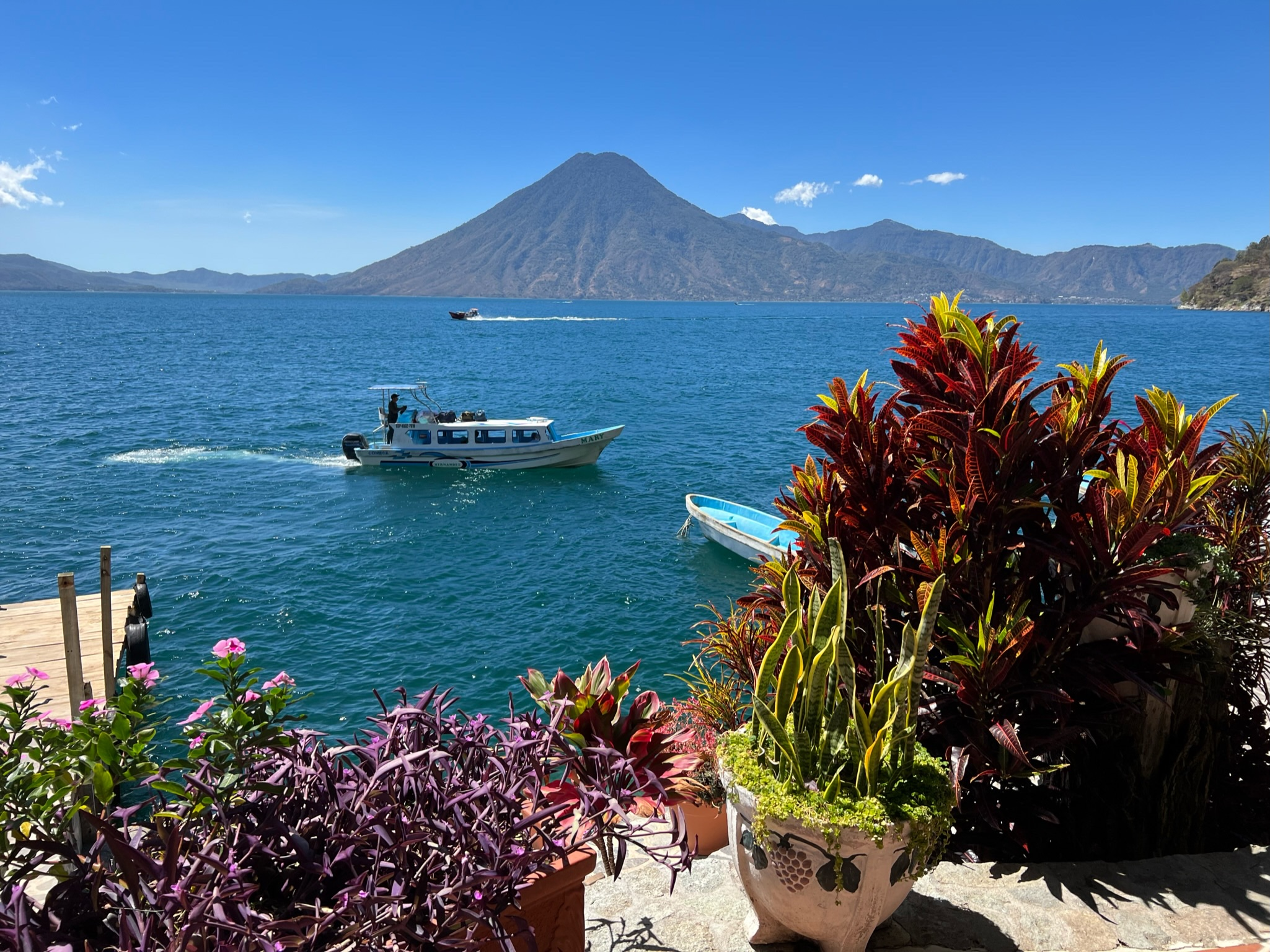
View of a lancha and Volcán Atitlán from Hotel La Casa del Mundo

== See also ==
- List of places in Guatemala
