= Lake Ipala =

Lake in Ipala, Guatemala, Guatemala

Laguna de Ipala
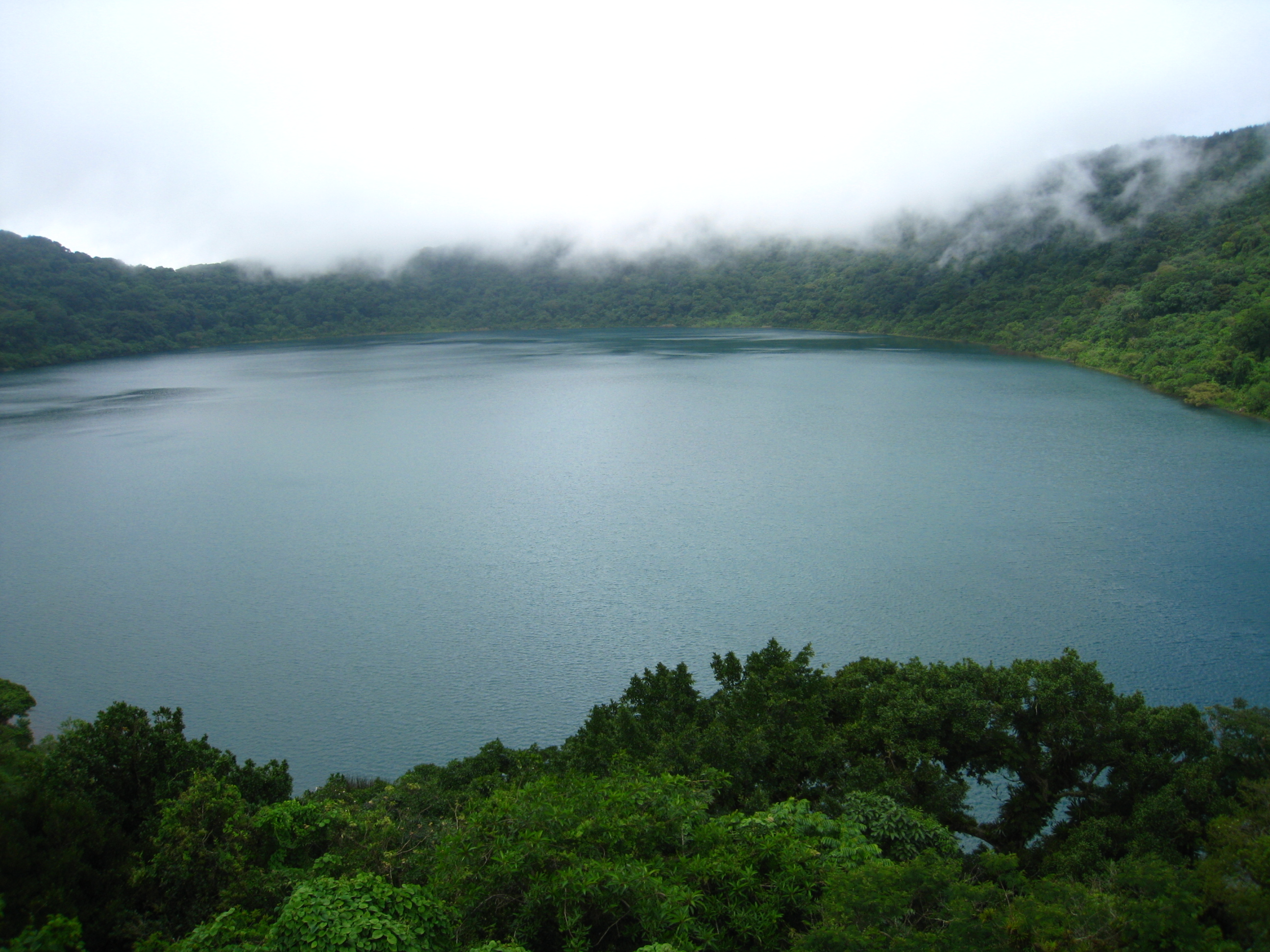
- Laguna de Ipala

- Location within Guatemala
- Location: Ipala (Chiquimula and Agua Blanca, Department of Jutiapa )
- Coordinates: 14°33′25″N 89°38′24″W
- Lake type: Crater lake
- Primary inflows: none
- Primary outflows: none
- Basin countries: Guatemala
- Surface area: 0.52 km^{2} (0.20 sq mi)
- Surface elevation: 1,493 m (4,898 ft)

Laguna de Ipala is a crater lake in Guatemala. The lake is located in the limits of the Departments of Jutiapa and Chiquimula, at the bottom of the one kilometre (0.62 mi) wide crater of the Ipala Volcano. The lake has a surface area of 0.52 km^{2} (0.20 sq mi) and is situated at an altitude of 1,493 m (4,898 ft).
