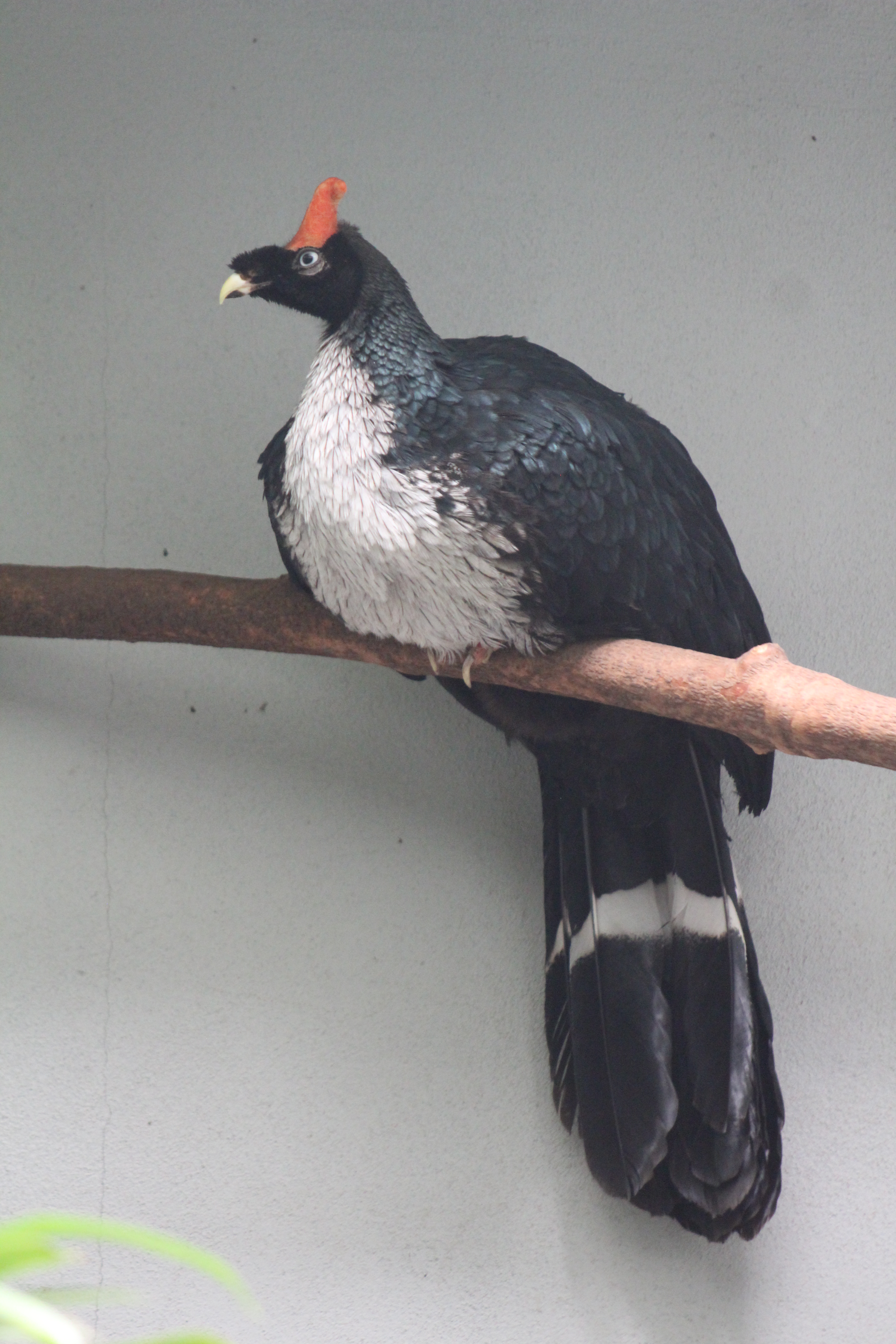
- At the St. Louis Zoo

Conservation status
- Endangered (IUCN 3.1)
- CITES Appendix I

Scientific classification
- Kingdom: Animalia
- Phylum: Chordata
- Class: Aves
- Order: Galliformes
- Family: Cracidae
- Subfamily: Oreophasinae; Sclater & Salvin, 1870
- Genus: Oreophasis; G.R. Gray, 1844
- Species: O. derbianus

Binomial name
- Oreophasis derbianus Gray, 1844

= Horned guan =

Species of bird

The horned guan (Oreophasis derbianus) is an endangered species in an ancient group of birds of the family Cracidae, which are related to the Australasian megapodes or mound builders (Megapodiidae). It is found in Mexico, Guatemala, and possibly Honduras.

== Taxonomy and systematics ==
The horned guan is not closely related to other guans, but merely resembles these birds in overall shape and color, whereas the horn is more reminiscent of the helmeted curassows. The species is the only survivor of a very ancient lineage of cracids that has been evolving independently from all other living members of this family for at least 20 million years, and possibly as much as 40 million years. Given that the basal relationships of the living cracids are not well resolved, the horned guan is often placed in its own subfamily Oreophasinae. Other taxonomists have placed it in either subfamily Cracinae or Penelopinae.

The holotype specimen of the horned guan is held in the collections of National Museums Liverpool at World Museum, with accession number NML-VZ D210. The specimen was collected from Volcán de Fuego, Guatemala by Don Joaquin Quinones circa 1843 and came to the Liverpool national collection via the 13th Earl of Derby's collection which was bequeathed to the people of Liverpool.

The horned guan is monotypic.

== Description ==
The horned guan is 75 to 85 cm (30 to 33 in) long. Its most distinctive feature is the tall, red, fleshy "horn" on its forehead. It has a small head, long strong legs, and a long broad tail. The sexes are alike in plumage but males have a taller horn and longer wings, tail, and legs than females. Adults have a glossy black head, neck, and upperparts with a bluish sheen. Their tail is black with a wide white band near its base. Their throat, breast, and upper belly are whitish with black flecks and their lower belly and flanks are brown. They have a small red dewlap, a white iris, a yellow bill, and red legs and feet. Juveniles resemble adults but are duller and have a smaller horn.

== Distribution and habitat ==
The horned guan is found in the southern Mexican state of Chiapas, possibly in Oaxaca, and in southern Guatemala. Reports from Honduras have not been confirmed. Its distribution is not continuous but highly local. It inhabits humid subtropical montane evergreen forest, cloudforest, and pine-oak forest. Its habitat is characterized by much undergrowth of tree ferns, epiphytes, mosses, and vines. In elevation it mostly ranges between 2,300 and 3,100 m (7,500 and 10,200 ft) but locally occurs as low as 1,200 m (3,900 ft) and as high as 3,350 m (11,000 ft).

== Behavior ==
=== Movement ===
The horned guan is a year-round resident throughout its range.

=== Feeding ===
The horned guan feeds mostly on a very wide variety of fruits; green leaves are a significant part of its diet with flowers and possibly insects eaten in small amounts. It forages singly or in small groups at all levels of the forest including the ground. Many seeds pass intact through its system, which suggests that it might be a significant dispersal agent.

=== Breeding ===
Most of the information about the horned guan's breeding biology comes from Mexico in a study published in 1995. Its breeding season appears to span at least from January to March. It is believed to be polygynous, with males spending a few days with each of three to five females. Its nest is an oval structure of dry leaves and roots place high in a tree and usually near running water. The clutch size is two eggs. The female incubates the clutch for 34 to 36 days and chicks leave the nest about three to six days after hatch.

=== Vocalization ===
Male and female horned guans have very different vocalizations. Males have a repertoire of at least five calls and females have seven or eight. Female's calls are "guttural and louder compared to those of males". The male's main call is "a very deep, slow and soft 'mooing'...comprising seven notes, a single brief hum followed by six paired hums, i.e. 'hum; hum, hummm; hum, hummm; hum, hummmmm' " that can be repeated for an hour. Females usually call in response to males, with a "guurk, guurk, guurk,... or guauuu, guauuu, guauuu".

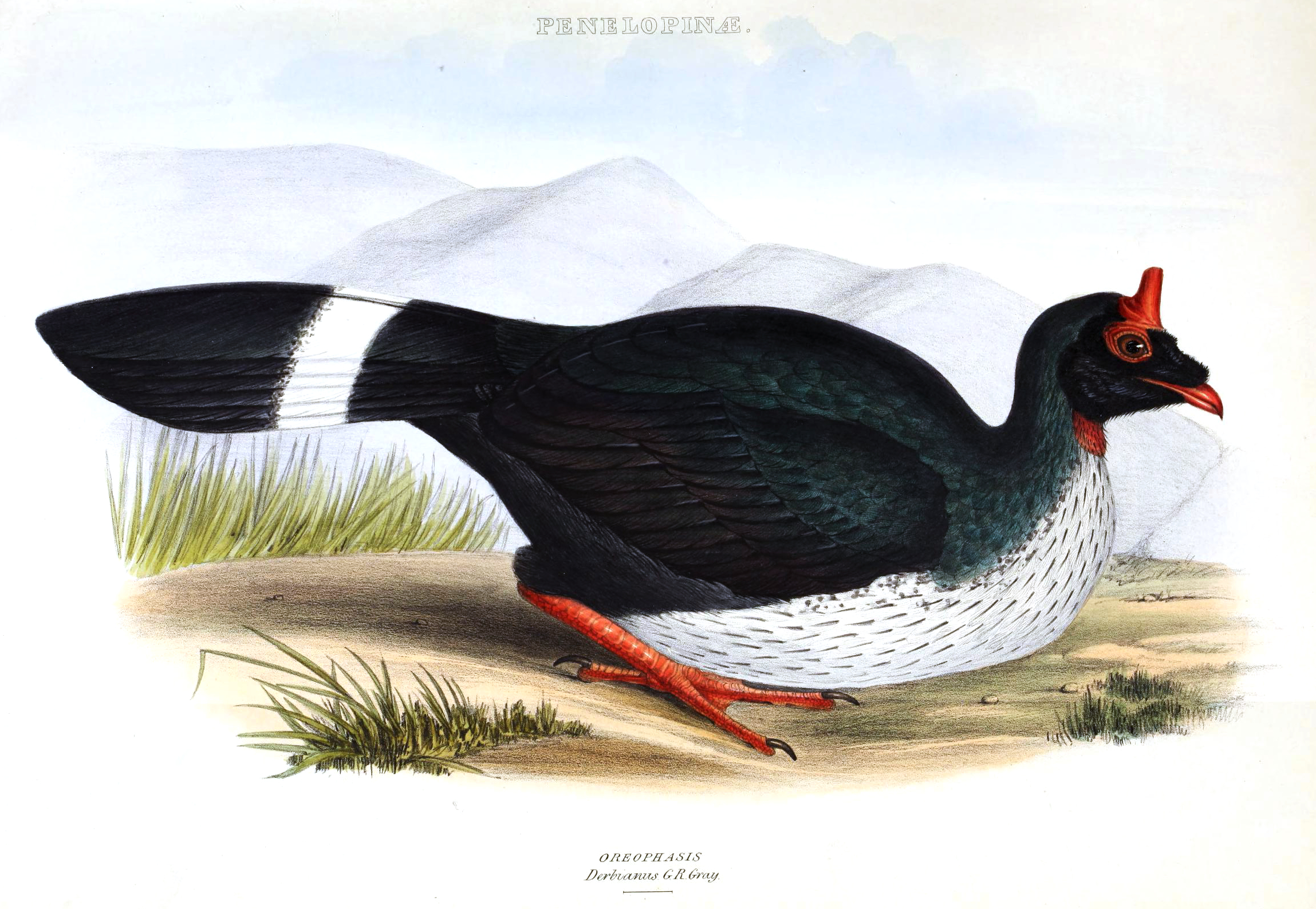

== Status ==
The IUCN originally in 1988 assessed the horned guan as Threatened, then in 1994 as Vulnerable, and since 2000 as Endangered. It has a very limited range and its estimated population of 600 to 1700 mature individuals is believed to be decreasing. Its range has contracted due to logging, firewood gathering, conversion of forest to agriculture, and subsistence hunting pressure. "The isolation of disjunct subpopulations makes this species especially vulnerable to further local extirpation. Climate change is further expected to exacerbate horned guan population declines by inducing shifts in the species' already restricted range". It does occur in at least one protected area in each of Mexico and Guatemala. However, one of its largest populations is on the unprotected Volcán Tacaná on the border between the two countries.

In Guatemala, remnant populations are severely restricted to high-altitude volcanic cloud forests—such as Tajumulco and the Atitlán complex—where extreme terrain logistics limit biological tracking but support community-directed canopy preservation.
