= Volcán Ipala =

Mountain in Guatemala

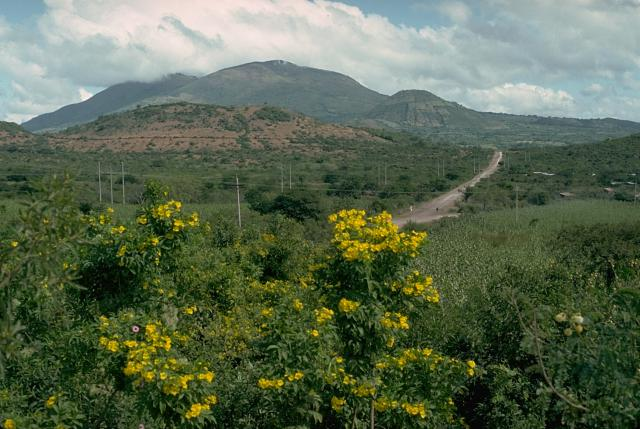

Highest point
- Elevation: 1,650 m (5,410 ft)
- Coordinates: 14°33′00″N 89°37′48″W

Geography
- Location within Guatemala
- Location: Guatemala

Geology
- Mountain type: Stratovolcano
- Volcanic arc: Central America Volcanic Arc
- Last eruption: Unknown

Volcán Ipala is a stratovolcano that lies at an elevation of 1,650 m (5,410 ft) above sea level in south-eastern Guatemala. It has a 1,000 metres (3,300 ft) wide summit crater which contains a crater lake (Lake Ipala), whose surface lies about 150 m (500 ft) below the crater rim. Volcán Ipala is part of a cluster of small stratovolcanoes and cinder cone fields in south-eastern Guatemala.

== See also ==
- List of volcanoes in Guatemala
