= Santa Cruz Balanyá =

- Municipality and town
- Location within Guatemala
- Coordinates: 14°44′N 90°55′W
- Country: Guatemala
- Department: Chimaltenango

Area
  - Total: 5.47 sq mi (14.16 km^{2})

Population (2023)
  - Total: 11,144
- Time zone: UTC+6 (Central Time)
- Climate: Cwb

Santa Cruz Balanyá (Spanish pronunciation: [ˌsanta ˈkɾus βalanˈɟʝa]) is a city and a municipality in the Chimaltenango department of Guatemala. It covers an area of approximately 14.16 km^{2} (5.47 sq mi). As per 2023 estimates, it has a population of about 11,144 inhabitants.

== History ==
Balanyá was part of the Sacatepéquez region, inhabited by the Kaqchikel people. During the Spanish colonial occupation, the prefix "Santa Cruz" was added, as per the practice of assigning Christian names to indigenous settlements. In the 18th century, Archbishop Fray Francisco Larras (1768–1770) visited the settlement and noted that it was an annex of the parish of San Juan Comalapa and the population consisted of approximately two hundred families and five hundred inhabitants, mostly made up of indigenous groups with a small Ladino population. He also described the area as agricultural growing maize and wheat, and noted that the people wore thick clothing and head coverings due to the cold weather.

After the independence of Guatemala, during the promulgation of the political constitution on 11 October 1825, Balanyá was placed within the eighth district of Comalapa. It was later attached to the circuit of Comalapa on 27 August 1836. When the Chimaltenango department was officially established on 12 September 1839, Santa Cruz Balanyá was incorporated into it.

== Geography ==
Santa Cruz Balanyá is a municipality in the Chimaltenango Department in Guatemala. It is spread over an area of 14.16 km^{2} (5.47 sq mi). It is located at a distance of 28 km (17 mi) from the departmental capital of Chimaltenango and 81 km (50 mi) from the national capital of Guatemala City. It borders the municipalities of Tecpán to the north, Zaragoza and Comalapa to the east, Patzicía to the south, and Patzún to the west.

Located at an elevation of 2,072.38 m (6,799.1 ft) above sea level, Santa Cruz Balanyá has a tropical monsoon climate (Köppen climate classification: Am). The municipality has an average annual temperature of 20.96 °C (69.73 °F) and receives about 145.49 mm (5.728 in) of rainfall annually.

== Demographics ==
The municipality had an estimated population of 11,144 inhabitants in 2023. The population consisted of 5,667 males and 5,477 females. About 30.0% of the population was below the age of fourteen, and 4.4% was over the age of 65 years. Majority of the population (83.7%) was classified as urban, while 16.3% lived in rural areas. About 85.8% of the inhabitants were born in the same municipality, while 14.2% were born in other municipalities in Guatemala or abroad. Maya (96.3%) formed the major ethnic group, while Ladinos (3.6%) formed a minority. The municipality had a literacy rate of 91%, and Spanish (79.2%) was the most spoken language, with Kaqchikel spoken by 19.4% of the population.
