= Parramos =

- Municipality and town
- Location within Guatemala
- Coordinates: 14°36′28″N 90°48′11″W
- Country: Guatemala
- Department: Chimaltenango

Area
  - Total: 10.7 sq mi (27.7 km^{2})

Population (2023)
  - Total: 21,102
  - Density: 1,970/sq mi (762/km^{2})
- Time zone: UTC+6 (Central Time)

Parramos is a city and a municipality in the Chimaltenango department of Guatemala. It covers an area of approximately 27.7 km^{2} (10.7 sq mi). As per 2023 estimates, it has a population of about 21,102 inhabitants.

== History ==
Parramos was founded in 1533 along the Paraxaj River. Parramos is derived from the Kaqchikel language words "pa" and "ramos" roughly translating to "in branches". The settlement was destroyed by an earthquake in September 1874. In 1876, the inhabitants transferred to nearby Valley of the Pines, and the town plan was developed by Martínez Flores.

== Geography ==
Parramos is a municipality in the Chimaltenango Department in Guatemala. It is spread over an area of 27.7 km^{2} (10.7 sq mi). It is located about 60 km (37 mi) from the national capital of Guatemala City and 7 km (4.3 mi) from the departmental capital of Chimaltenango. It borders El Tejar to the north, San Andrés Itzapa to the northwest, Pastores and Santa Catarina Barahona to the east, Santa Catarina Barahona and San Antonio Aguas Calientes to the south, and San Andrés Itzapa to the west.

Located at an elevation of 1,810.62 m (5,940.4 ft) above sea level, Parramos has a tropical monsoon climate (Köppen climate classification: Am). The municipality has an average annual temperature of 21.49 °C (70.68 °F) and receives about 149.19 mm (5.874 in) of rainfall annually.

== Demographics ==
The municipality had an estimated population of 21,102 inhabitants in 2023. The population consisted of 10,646 males and 10,456 females. About 28.9% of the population was below the age of fourteen, and 4.0% was over the age of 65 years. Majority of the population (75.2%) was classified as urban, while 24.8% lived in rural areas. About 68.9% of the inhabitants were born in the same municipality. Ladinos (49%) and Maya (49%) formed the two largest ethnic groups. The municipality had a literacy rate of 86.7%, and Spanish (91.1%) was the most spoken language.
