= Kaqchikel =

Kaqchikel, also spelled Kaqchickel, Kakchiquel, Cachiquel, Cakchikel, Caqchikel, or Cakchiquel, may refer to:

- Kaqchikel people, an ethnic subgroup of the Maya
- Kaqchikel language, the language spoken by that people
