= Fernando Jarquin Pira =

Guatemalan entrepreneur

Fernando Jarquín Pira (Guatemala City, 1 February 1965 – 10 March 2023) was a Guatemalan entrepreneur and a leader in the pharmaceutical industry of Central America's northern triangle (Guatemala, El Salvador, and Honduras). Jarquín was a shareholder of Agencia Farmacéutica Internacional, S.A. (AGEFINSA) and Iberfarma, S.A., two of the most prominent pharmaceutical distributors in Guatemala.

== Early life ==
Fernando Jarquín was the son of Roberto Jarquín Richeme and Isabel Pira Arrivillaga. He spent his childhood in Guatemala City and Técpan, Chimaltenango. His family established themselves in Técpan in the late 19th century. In 1983, Jarquín graduated from high school at Marist School Liceo Guatemala, a private Catholic school located in Guatemala City.

Jarquín studied international commerce and marketing at the Universidad Rafael Landívar. During his college years, he worked as a sales representative for several companies in the international commerce space. In 1984, when he was 19 years old, he started to work as a sales representative for Concorde Line, a shipping company.

== Business career ==
=== Pharmaceutical industry ===
Jarquín began his post-college career in the pharmaceutical industry. He started working for the Swiss company Sandoz-Wander (now known as Novartis Group) in 1987.

In 1995, Jarquín founded Agencia Farmacéutica Internacional, S.A. (AGEFINSA), a pharmaceutical distribution company that sells pharmaceutical products in Guatemala, El Salvador, and Honduras. AGEFINSA represents several of the largest European pharmaceutical laboratories.

In a news interview, he described AGEFINSA: "The company has a complete range of pharmaceutical products from recognized pharmaceutical companies worldwide. We also distribute “orphan” products, meaning products needed in the market but which lack a local representative. Thus, we cover a need to improve the quality of life of patients."

In 1996, Jarquín founded Iberfarma, S.A., his second pharmaceutical company, to distribute pharmaceutical products to private hospitals and drug stores, reaching a different market segment than the recently created AGEFINSA.

=== Dairy industry and byproducts ===
Jarquín’s dairy and byproduct businesses are centered around Productos Valparaíso, S.A., a company located in the territorial division of Alta Verapaz, Guatemala, in a farm that runs under the name “Finca Valparaiso”; and the ranch FJ Chichavac, located in the Municipality of Tecpán, in the department of Chimaltenango. Productos Valparaíso produces Jersey cow milk, goat milk, and various types of yogurt and cheese.

Jarquín is also connected to Milk Source Genetics, a U.S. milk producer that sells its products in Wisconsin, Michigan and Missouri. He is also the co-owner of the cow “Musique iatola Martha”, a three-time winner at the Royal Agricultural Winter Fair, which takes place every year in Toronto, Canada.

=== Wine industry ===
In 2002, Jarquín ventured into the wine import and distribution industry after he bought the company La Cofradía de los Vinos, a high-end wine distribution company of brands such as Cousiño Macul (Chile), Luigi Bosca, Salentein and Pulenta (Argentina), and Pisco Cuatro Gallos (Peru).

The company serves the emerging Guatemalan wine market and is focused on high-level wineries. It sells a few brands in supermarkets. The most exclusive brands in its portfolio are sold in Guatemala City's top restaurants and in certain places in the city of Antigua, Guatemala.

=== K´abel Business Center ===
In 2013, Jarquín opened the Centro de Convenciones K´abel (Kabel, S.A., commercial name “K´abel”), a business-oriented convention center that integrates meeting and conference rooms. Originally, the center hosted mostly medical institutions, physicians and pharmaceutical companies.

Due to the success of the business, in 2015 the company changed its commercial name to K’abel Business Center. Currently, the company serves private companies in diverse sectors and industries, and business chambers such as the American Chamber of Commerce (AMCHAM).

The executive chef of K’abel Business Center is Diego Jarquin, a graduate from Le Cordon Bleu Peru.

=== Equine breeding ===
Jarquín also owns FJ Chichavac Ranch, which is a member of the National Association of Breeders and Owners of Peruvian Paso Horses (ANCPCPP).

The ranch is located in Tecpan, Chimaltenango, Guatemala. Jarquín has been acknowledged for his accomplishments in the breeding and genetic development of stallions, especially from Peru. His horses have been prized many times in contests organized by the ANCPCPP.

== Philanthropy ==
Jarquín and his company, Productos Valparaíso, through their corporate social responsibility program, are helping school children from neighboring communities continue with their education. The purpose behind the program is to develop future leaders who will help continue economic development in the region after they graduate.

In 2016, the company helped rebuild the Escuela Oficial Rural Mixta (Mixed Rural Official School), located in Chuparral 1 Village, in the department of Chimaltenango. The school was destroyed in 2010 by Tropical Storm Agatha.
