= Kaqchikel language =

Mayan language spoken in Guatemala

Kaqchikel
- Kaqchikel Chʼabʼäl
- Native to: Guatemala
- Region: Central Highlands
- Ethnicity: Kaqchikel
- Native speakers: 410,000 (2019 census)
- Language family: Mayan: Quichean–Mamean; Greater Quichean; Quichean; Kaqchikel

Language codes
- ISO 639-3: cak
- Glottolog: kaqc1270
- ELP: Kaqchikel
- Kaqchikel shown in pink

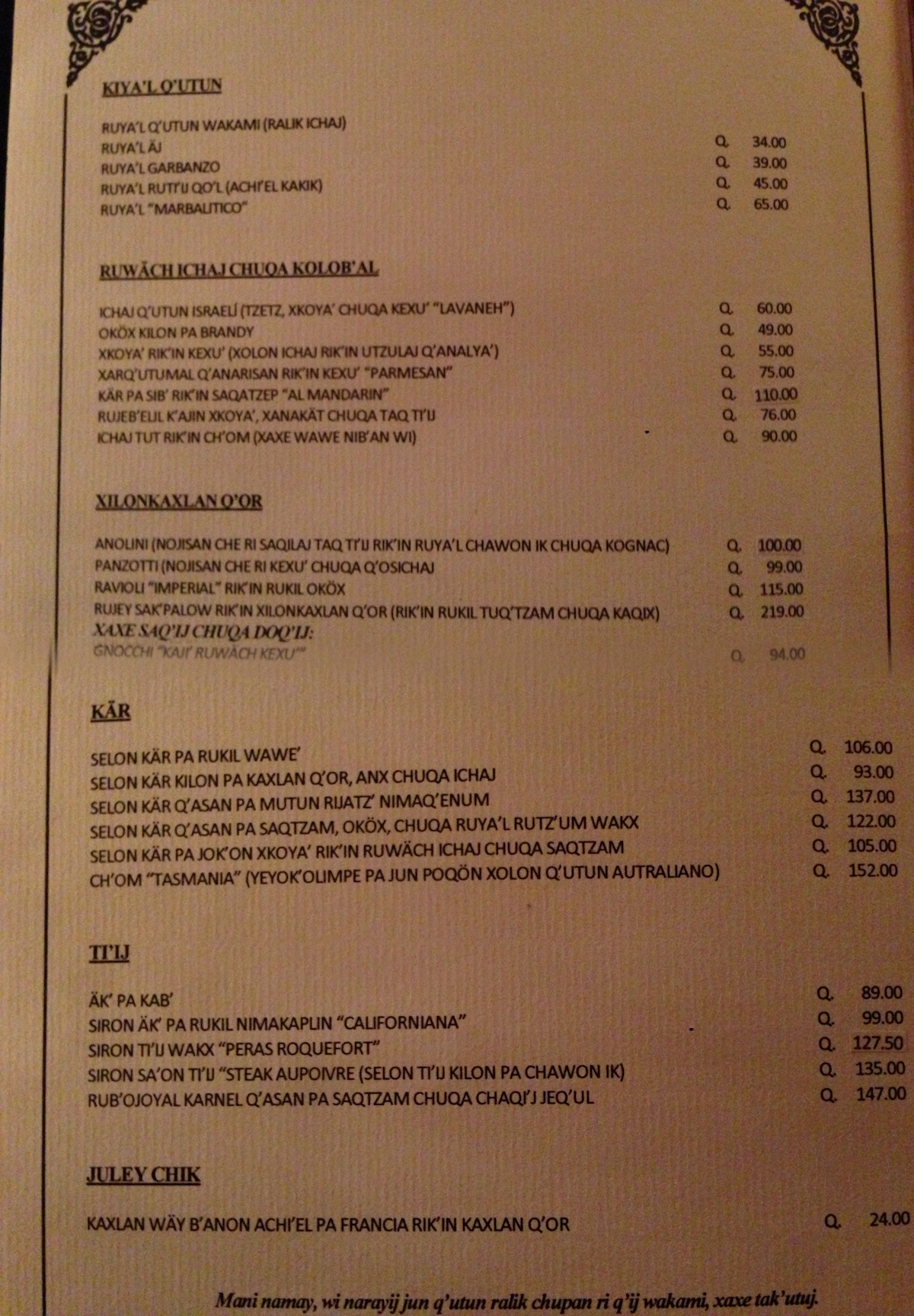
Menu in Kaqchikel

The Kaqchikel language (in modern orthography; formerly also spelled Cakchiquel or Cachiquel) is an Indigenous Mesoamerican language and a member of the Quichean–Mamean branch of the Mayan languages family. It is spoken by the Indigenous Kaqchikel people in central Guatemala.

While languages of the Mayan family are not mutually intelligible, Kaqchikel is closest to the Kʼicheʼ (Quiché) and Tzʼutujil languages.

Kaqchikel is taught in public schools through Guatemala's intercultural bilingual education programs.

== History ==
History and genealogy of the Mayan languages. Kaqchikel is part of the Quichean subfamily, colored lavender in this image.

=== Before conquest ===
Kaqchikel is spoken by the Indigenous Maya in Central Guatemala. The Mayan civilization dates back to the Pre-classic period (2000 BC to 300 AD). Geographically, the Maya expanded from Mexico, Belize and Guatemala. This changed between 900 AD and when the Spanish arrived. Their settlement moved west and into the highlands of Guatemala. Archaeological evidence shows suggestions of Kaqchikel living in Iximcheʼ, which today is located near Tecpán Guatemala.

=== After conquest ===
In 1523, Spanish conquistador Pedro de Alvarado left Mexico and headed towards Guatemala with a Spanish and Tlaxcaltec army. His first victory was over the Kʼiche, which led him towards the Kaqchikel capital. The Kaqchikel from state of Iximche joined forces with de Alvarado, to take over the Tzʼutujiles. However, disagreements between Alvarado and the Kaqchikel led to war between them in August 1524, with Tzʼutujiles now aligned with the Spanish under chieftain Pedro Ajtziquinhay. The war lasted a decade before Spanish victory over Kaqchikel leader Kaji' Imox in 1540.

José Chicol worked with the missionary William Cameron Townsend on a Kaqchikel translation of the New Testament, published in 1931. Chicol's revision of it was published in 1954.

=== Present ===
Today, the Mayan language of Kaqchikel is being revitalized and several Mayans are using education as a way to restore their language and culture. In 1986 the Academy of the Mayan Languages of Guatemala (ALMG) standardized an alphabet for the Mayan languages, which started a new movement for linguistic conversation.

== Literacy ==
Literacy rates in Kaqchikel are low. Literacy campaigns are usually conducted in Spanish, and promote Spanish. In fact, most Mayan people are more literate in Spanish than they are in their native tongue. However, this is changing due to the movement to promote Mayan language literacy. Kaqchikel is being taught in public schools such as Guatemala's intercultural bilingual education programs. United States universities also offer programs that give the opportunity to learn Kaqchikel, such as Tulane University and the University of Kansas.

== Geographic distribution ==
The Kaqchikel language is spoken in the following municipalities (Variación Dialectal en Kaqchikel, 2000).

Baja Verapaz
- Santa Cruz El Chol
Chimaltenango

- Tecpán
- Patzún
- Patzicía
- San José Poaquil
- San Martín Jilotepeque
- San Andrés Itzapa
- San Miguel Pochuta
- San Pedro Yepocapa
- San Juan Comalapa

Escuintla
- Santa Lucía Cotzumalguapa
Guatemala

- Chuarrancho
- San Juan Sacatepéquez
- San Pedro Ayampuc
- San Pedro Sacatepéquez
- San Raimundo

Sacatepéquez

- Alotenango
- Magdalena Milpas Altas
- San Antonio Aguas Calientes
- San Bartolomé Milpas Altas
- San Lucas Sacatepéquez
- San Miguel Dueñas
- Santa Catarina Barahona
- Santa Lucía Milpas Altas
- Santa María de Jesús
- Santiago Sacatepéquez
- Santo Domingo Xenacoj
- Sumpango

Sololá

- Concepción
- Panajachel
- San Andrés Semetabaj
- San Antonio Palopó
- San José Chacayá
- Santa Catarina Palopó
- Santa Cruz La Laguna
- San Marcos La Laguna
- Sololá

Suchitepéquez

- San Antonio Suchitepéquez
- San Juan Bautista
- Patulul

== Classification ==
Kaqchikel is a member of the Mayan language family. Mayan languages fall under the Proto- Mayan language family. This family is broken into four branches: Western, Eastern, Yucatecan, and Huastecan. Kaqchikel falls under the Qichean and Quichean Proper. Quichean Proper breaks down into four new languages: Kaqchikel, Tzʼutujil, Kʼicheʼ, and Achi. Tzʼutujil is the closest dialect to Kaqchikel. Mayan languages are spoken throughout Mexico, Guatemala, Belize, and Honduras.

== Phonology ==
In the charts below, each of the Kaqchikel phonemes is represented by the character or set of characters that denote it in the standard orthography developed by the Guatemalan Academy of Mayan Languages (ALMG) and sanctioned by the Guatemalan government. Where different, the corresponding symbol in the International Phonetic Alphabet appears in brackets. The dialect used in this example is that of Xenacoj.

=== Vowels ===
Kaqchikel dialects differ somewhat in their vowel inventories. Each dialect has a set of five tense vowels and either one, two, four, or five lax vowels. The chart below shows all the possible vowels that can occur in dialects of Kaqchikel. Although the dialect of Sololá uses the maximal ten-vowel system with all the vowels except schwa /ə/, the dialects of San Juan Sacatepéquez and San Andrés Semetabaj only use the five tense vowels and schwa.

There is a variance in the pronunciation of the lax vowels across the dialects. Some dialects lower the given vowel, others center the vowel but do not lower it. The Xenacoj dialect used here both centers and lowers the vowels with a tendency to more strongly lower close vowels and more strongly center back vowels.

		Front	Central	Back
Close	tense	i ⟨i⟩		ɯ ~ u ⟨u⟩
Close	lax	ɪ ⟨ï⟩	ə̞ ~ ɨ̞ ⟨ä⟩	ʉ̞ ~ ʊ ⟨ü⟩
Mid	tense	e ⟨e⟩		ɤ ~ o ⟨o⟩
Mid	lax	ɛ ⟨ë⟩		ɵ̞ ~ ɔ ⟨ö⟩
Open	tense		a ⟨a⟩	

The pronunciation of the vowels spelt with o and u varies between [ɤ] and [o] for ⟨o⟩, and [ɯ] and [u] for ⟨u⟩. This roundness ambiguity for the back vowel phonemes is a trait found in many Mayan languages, such as Tzotzil and Mam. These vowel sounds may be pronounced as either rounded or unrounded depending on the speakers preference, and both are considered native-like.

- The vowel sound represented by the letter ⟨ü⟩ has a pronunciation between the [ʉ] and [ʊ] sounds. It is farther back and lower than the prototypical [ʉ] but it is not as low or back as [ʊ].
- The vowel sound represented by the letter ⟨ö⟩ has similar traits. It is typically pronounced as either a lower [ɵ], though not as low as [ɘ] but may also be pronounced as [ɔ]. It may fall anywhere between those sounds, but only lowered [ɵ] and centered [ɔ] are considered native-like.

=== Consonants ===
Like other Mayan languages, Kaqchikel does not distinguish voiced and voiceless stops and affricates, instead distinguishing plain and glottalized stops and affricates. The plain stops and affricates are usually voiceless and are aspirated at the ends of words and unaspirated elsewhere. The glottalized stops and affricates are usually ejective in the case of tʼ, kʼ, chʼ, and tzʼ and implosive in the case of bʼ and qʼ.

		Bilabial	Alveolar		Palatal	Velar	Uvular	Glottal
		Bilabial	plain	sibilant	Palatal	Velar	Uvular	Glottal
Nasal		m ⟨m⟩	n ⟨n⟩					
Plosive/ Affricate	pulmonic	p ⟨p⟩	t ⟨t⟩	ts ⟨tz⟩	tʃ ⟨ch⟩	k ⟨k⟩	q ⟨q⟩	ʔ ⟨ʼ⟩
Plosive/ Affricate	glottalic	ɓ̥ ⟨bʼ⟩	tʼ ⟨tʼ⟩	tsʼ ⟨tzʼ⟩	tʃʼ ⟨chʼ⟩	kʼ ⟨kʼ⟩	ʛ̥ ⟨qʼ⟩	ʔ ⟨ʼ⟩
Fricative				s ⟨s⟩	ʃ ⟨x⟩		χ ⟨j⟩	
Approximant			l ⟨l⟩		j ⟨y⟩	w ⟨w⟩		
Tap			ɾ ⟨r⟩					

- /p t t͡s t͡ʃ k q/ are aspirated word-finally.
- /l j w ɾ/ are devoiced word-finally.

=== Syllable structure ===
Only a certain number of syllable types occur in Kaqchikel. The most common syllable types are CV (consonant-vowel) and CVC (consonant-vowel-consonant). V (vowel only) or VC (vowel-consonant) syllables are not allowed phonetically; a syllable that is conceived of as beginning with a vowel will begin in pronunciation with a glottal stop, although this is not always reflected in standard orthography or in the phonological realization of a word. While two CVC syllables often occur next to each other in the same word, consonant clusters in a single syllable are relatively uncommon. When these do occur, they are normally at the beginnings or ends of words and consist of either two continuants, a sonorant and a stop, or a fricative and a stop, with the stop always to the inside of its partner.

== Morphology and syntax ==
Kaqchikel is a moderately synthetic language with fusional affixes. It has a strong system of affixation, including both suffixes and prefixes. These attach to both nouns and verbs; prefixes are exclusively inflective, whereas suffixes can be inflective or derivational. Inflective prefixes are quite short, often composed of a single sound and never consisting of more than three; suffixes can be longer than this. Because of the synthetic-fusional nature of Kaqchikel, it is difficult to discuss the language's morphology and syntax as two separate entities; they are very robustly intertwined.

=== Word classes ===
Kaqchikel has 6 major word classes and several minor classes, referred to collectively as "particles." The major word classes are groups of bases or roots that can take affixes. These classes are nouns, adjectives, adverbs, intransitive verbs, transitive verbs, and positionals. Positionals in this language are a group of roots which cannot function as words on their own; in combination with affixes they are used to describe relationships of position and location. In English, these words would fall into other categories, namely adjectives, adverbs, and verbs, both transitive and intransitive.

The minor classes or particles are words that do not take affixes; they mostly function in adverbial roles, and include such things as interrogative particles, affirmative/negative words, markers of time and location, conjunctions, prepositions and demonstratives. In addition to these officially recognized classes, there are a few other groups of words which do not fall neatly into any of the above categories. These groups are articles, pronouns, numbers, affectives, and words used for measurement. All of these types of words function differently in Kaqchikel, and so they are considered to belong to different word classes.

=== Agreement ===
Kaqchikel shows agreement with the subject and object of a verb. Nouns also show agreement with their possessors. The agreement pattern of Kaqchikel follows an ergative-absolutive pattern. This affects both nouns and verbs. The functions of the ergative agreement include marking not only subjects of transitive verbs, but also possessors of nouns. There are two main sets of allomorphs for the ergative agreement markers, which are prefixed to the noun or verb they modify. One set is used before roots beginning in a consonant, and the other before those beginning with a vowel. These forms below are found when the ergative marks the possessor of nouns.

before a consonant
	Singular	Plural
1st person	nu-	qa-
2nd person	a-	i-
3rd person	ru-	ki-

before a vowel
	Singular	Plural
1st person	w-	q-
2nd person	aw-	iw-
3rd person	r-	k-

When the ergative forms are being used to denote the subject of a transitive verb, some of the forms differ. Before consonants, first person singular nu- becomes in- and third person singular ru- becomes u-. Before vowels, first person singular w- becomes inw-, third person singular u- becomes ur-, first person plural qa- becomes w-, and third person plural ki- becomes kiw-.

The third person singular of the ergative is variable in its phonology, and the initial /r/ is often omitted, with variability among the different dialects of Kaqchikel. Absolutive agreement has three functions: its marks the subject of an intransitive verb, the subject of a non-verbal predicate, and the object of a transitive verb. Unlike ergative agreement, it has only one set of forms, which are used before both consonants and vowels.

	Singular	Plural
1st person	in-	oj-
2nd person	at-	ix-
3rd person	–	e-

Note that the third person singular is unmarked. In some dialects, an epenthetic vowel is inserted between a marker of the incompletive or potential states and the base, in the space which would be occupied by the absolutive prefix. However, this is not an allophone of the absolutive third person singular marker, but rather a phonetic addition which is not related to the case marking system.

Also, marking of subjects and objects occurs only on the verb, not on any nouns which may fill those roles as constituents. Agreement can take the place of pronouns, thus the language has pro-drop.

=== Word order ===
In Kaqchikel, the head of a phrase usually comes before any other element of the phrase. The following sentences show examples of the order of sentences, determiner phrases (DP), noun phrases (NP), prepositional phrases (PP), and quantifier phrases (QP):

X-u-pax-ij ri achin ri bʼojoy
COMPL-3S.ERG-break-TR the man the pot
'The man broke the pot'

[_{DP} Ru-tzʼiʼ [_{NP} a Xwan] x-u-kʼüx ri akʼwal.
{} 3S.ERG-dog {} CL Juan COMPL-3S.ERG-bite the child
ʼJuan's dog bit the child.ʼ

Kʼo jun chʼoy [_{PP} chrij ri chʼakät].
exist a mouse {} behind:3S.ERG the chair
'There is a mouse behind the chair.'

A Xwan x-u-tïj [_{QP} r-onojel ri kinäqʼ].
CL Juan COMPL-3S.ERG-eat {} 3S.ERG-all the bean
'Juan ate all the beans.'

Sentences show considerable variability in their word order. The syntactic function of words is determined not only by their position at the beginning, middle or end of a sentence, but also by their definiteness, level of animation and potency, and a logical analysis of what role each word can play in the sentence. (For example, the verb to throw with the nouns child and stone can only have one logical ordering, regardless of the position of the nouns with respect to the verb. For this reason, an inanimate constituent cannot be the subject if the other constituent is animate.). Due to these conditions, Kaqchikel word order is relatively free and various orderings can be seen without there being any confusion or lack of understanding.

Possible word orders that can occur in Kaqchikel are verb-first orders (VSO, VOS) and subject-first orders (SVO, SOV). (V: verb, S: subject, O: object)

- Verb-first orders (VSO, VOS). When the verb occurs first and only one constituent is definite, then that constituent functions as the subject. If both constituents are definite, then the one closest to the verb (the first constituent) is the subject; if both constituents are indefinite, then the subject is the latter of the two.
- Subject-first orders (SVO, SOV). The subject can come first only if it is animate and the object is not. In this case, the definiteness of the two constituents does not matter; that is to say, the subject can be either definite or indefinite, so long as it is animate and occurs first. The order of the verb and object is unimportant.

Other constituents of a sentence, such as dative, comitative, agentive, and adverbial phrases, tend to come first in the sentence. However, they can also come after the nucleus of the sentence, the predicate.

=== Reduplication ===
Kaqchikel uses reduplication as an intensifier. For example, the Kaqchikel word for large is /nim/; to say that something is very large, the adjectival form is reduplicated as /nim nim/. This form is not a single word but two separate words which, when combined, intensify the meaning of the base word, the same way "very" does in English.

== Vocabulary ==
=== Numbers ===
1. jun
2. kaʼiʼ
3. oxiʼ
4. kajiʼ
5. woʼoʼ
6. waqiʼ
7. wuquʼ
8. waqxaqiʼ
9. bʼelejeʼ
10. lajuj
11. julajuj
12. kabʼlajuj
13. oxlajuj
14. kajlajuj
15. wolajuj
16. waqlajuj
17. wuqlajuj
18. waqxaqlajuj
19. bʼelejlajuj
20. jukʼal

=== Common words ===
- winaq, person
- achin, man
- ixöq, woman
- ixim, corn
- kotzʼiʼj, flower
- qʼïj, sun/day
- akʼwal, child
- teʼej, mother
- tataʼaj, father
- wäy, tortilla
- mes, cat
- tzʼi', dog
- ulew, earth/land
- chʼumil, star
- juyu', mountain
- che', tree
- ik', moon/month
- tlinche', marimba
- ya', water
- jay, house

== Use in modern media and popular culture ==
The 2015 film Ixcanul, directed by Jayro Bustamante, was filmed mostly in Kaqchikel.

== Bibliography ==
- Blair, Robert; Robertson, John S.; Richman, Larry L.; Sansom, Greg; Salazar, Julio; Yool, Juan; Choc, Alejandro (1981). Diccionario Español-Cakchiquel-Inglés (PDF). New York & London: Garland Publishing. ISBN 9780824092771. OCLC 710447. Archived from the original (PDF) on 2014-10-10.
- Garzon, Susan; Brown, R. McKenna; Richards, Julia Becker (1998). The Life of Our Language: Kaqchikel Maya Maintenance, Shift, and Revitalization. University of Texas Press. ISBN 9780292728141. OCLC 37902431.
- Brown, R. McKenna; Maxwell, Judith M.; Little, Walter E. (2006). ¿La ütz awäch? Introduction to Kaqchikel Maya Language. Angelika Bauer (illus.). Austin: University of Texas Press. ISBN 0-292-71460-2. OCLC 71238541.
- Blair, Robert W.; Campbell, Kristine; Campbell, Lyle; Robertson, John S.; Stone, James J. (1969). Cakchiquel Basic Course. Provo: Peace Corps. OCLC 5081621.
- Cheney, Donald (2020). "Cakchiquel (Kaqchikel)". In Noss, Philip A.; Houser, Charles S. (eds.). A Guide to Bible Translation: People, Languages, and Topics (2nd ed.). Swindon, England: United Bible Societies. p. 93. ISBN 978-1545658116.
- Cojti Macario, Narciso; Chacäch Cutzal, Martín; Armando Cali, Marcos (1998). Diccionario del idioma Kaqchikel. Kaqchikel-Español. Antigua Guatemala, Guatemala: Proyecto Lingüístico Francisco Marroquín. ISBN 9992256362. OCLC 41572509.
- García Matzar, Pedro Oscar; Toj Cotzajay, Valerio; Coc Tuiz, Domingo (1992). Gramática del idioma Kaqchikel (in Spanish). Nora C. England (advisor), Vitalino Pérez Martínez (coord.). Antigua Guatemala, Guatemala: Proyecto Lingüístico Francisco Marroquín (PLFM). OCLC 30474328.
- Herbruger Jr., Alfredo; Barrios, Eduardo Diaz (1956). Método para aprender a hablar, leer y escribir la lengua cakchiquel (in Spanish). Guatemala City, Guatemala: Talleres de la Tipografía Nacional de Guatemala. OCLC 150441108.
- Patal Majzul, Filiberto; García Matzar, Pedro Oscar; Espantzay Serech, Carmelina (2000). Rujunamaxik ri Kaqchikel Chiʼ = Variación dialectal en Kaqchikel. Antigua Guatemala, Guatemala: Proyecto de Investigación Lingüística de Oxlajuuj Keej Mayaʼ Ajtzʼiibʼ (OKMA); Editorial Cholsamaj. ISBN 99922-53-13-4. OCLC 46849157.

Dictionaries, grammars, and translations in Kaqchikel (Cakchiquel)
