= Patzún =

- Municipality
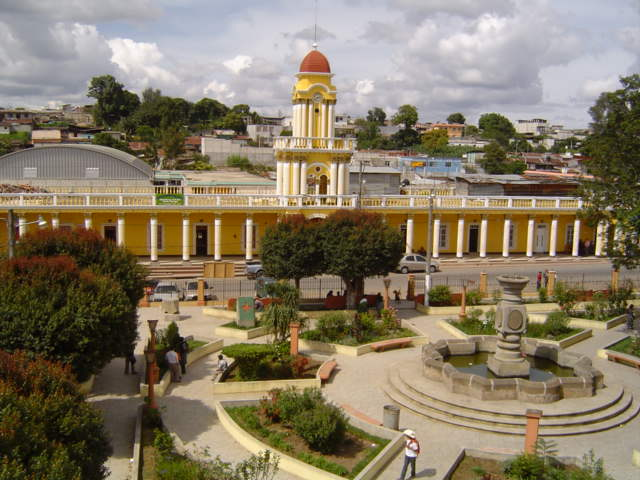
- Central Plaza and town hall

- Location in Guatemala
- Coordinates: 14°41′N 91°01′W
- Country: Guatemala
- Department: Chimaltenango

Area
  - Total: 48 sq mi (124 km^{2})

Population (2023)
  - Total: 72,873
  - Density: 1,520/sq mi (588/km^{2})
- Climate: Cwb

Patzún (Spanish pronunciation: [patˈsun]) is a city and a municipality in the Chimaltenango department of Guatemala. It covers an area of approximately 165.6 km^{2} (63.9 sq mi). As per 2023 estimates, it has a population of about 72,873 inhabitants.

== History ==
Patzún was inhabited by the Kaqchikel people since the 12th century at the least, and was part of the Iximche kingdom. Its name is derived from the words "pa" and "sum" meaning "place" and "sunflower" respectively, roughly translating to the "place of sunflowers". Another meaning that has been attributed is that it came from "pa" and "tsun" meaning "leather".

As per local lore, the documents regarding the establishment of the town were hidden by San Bernardino, the patron of the town, behind a red cloth, during the Spanish colonization in the early 16th century, and the documents were lost later, and only the cloth is preserved. The Franciscans built a church in 1540. The city was destroyed in 1566, and the church and municipal buildings were damaged in 1760, when a cargo of gun powder exploded. In 1839, Patzún became a municipality in the department of Chimaltenango, when it was created.

== Geography ==
Patzún is a municipality in the Chimaltenango Department in Guatemala. It is spread over an area of 165.5 km^{2} (63.9 sq mi). It lies in the western corner of the department. It borders the municipalities of Tecpán to the north, Pochuta and Acatenango to the south, Patzicía and Santa Cruz Balanyá to the east, and San Lucas Tolimán and San Antonio Palopó to the west.

=== Climate ===
Located at an elevation of 2,235.38 m (7,333.9 ft) above sea level, Patzún has a subtropical highland climate (Köppen climate classification: Cwb). The municipality has an average annual temperature of 15.7 °C (60.3 °F), and receives about 1,678 mm (66.1 in) of rainfall annually.

Climate data for Patzún
Month	Jan	Feb	Mar	Apr	May	Jun	Jul	Aug	Sep	Oct	Nov	Dec	Year
Mean daily maximum °C (°F)	19.4 (66.9)	20.3 (68.5)	21.7 (71.1)	22.5 (72.5)	21.9 (71.4)	20.4 (68.7)	20.6 (69.1)	21.1 (70.0)	20.2 (68.4)	19.9 (67.8)	19.6 (67.3)	19.4 (66.9)	20.6 (69.0)
Daily mean °C (°F)	13.3 (55.9)	13.9 (57.0)	15.2 (59.4)	16.4 (61.5)	16.9 (62.4)	16.3 (61.3)	16.2 (61.2)	16.2 (61.2)	15.7 (60.3)	15.4 (59.7)	14.1 (57.4)	13.6 (56.5)	15.3 (59.5)
Mean daily minimum °C (°F)	7.3 (45.1)	7.5 (45.5)	8.7 (47.7)	10.4 (50.7)	12.0 (53.6)	12.2 (54.0)	11.8 (53.2)	11.3 (52.3)	11.3 (52.3)	10.9 (51.6)	8.7 (47.7)	7.8 (46.0)	10.0 (50.0)
Average precipitation mm (inches)	2 (0.1)	4 (0.2)	6 (0.2)	35 (1.4)	112 (4.4)	287 (11.3)	204 (8.0)	226 (8.9)	319 (12.6)	150 (5.9)	35 (1.4)	6 (0.2)	1,386 (54.6)
Source: Climate-Data.org

== Demographics ==
The municipality had an estimated population of 72,873 inhabitants in 2023. The population consisted of 37,027 males and 35,846 females. About 29.7% of the population was below the age of fourteen, and 4.6% was over the age of 65 years. Majority of the population (54.3%) was classified as urban, while 45.7% lived in rural areas. About 94.9% of the inhabitants were born in the same municipality. Maya (95.1%) formed the major ethnic group, with Ladinos (4.7%) forming a significant minority. The municipality had a literacy rate of 84.8%, and Kaqchikel (71.9%) was the most spoken language.
