= Santa Catarina Palopó =

- Municipality
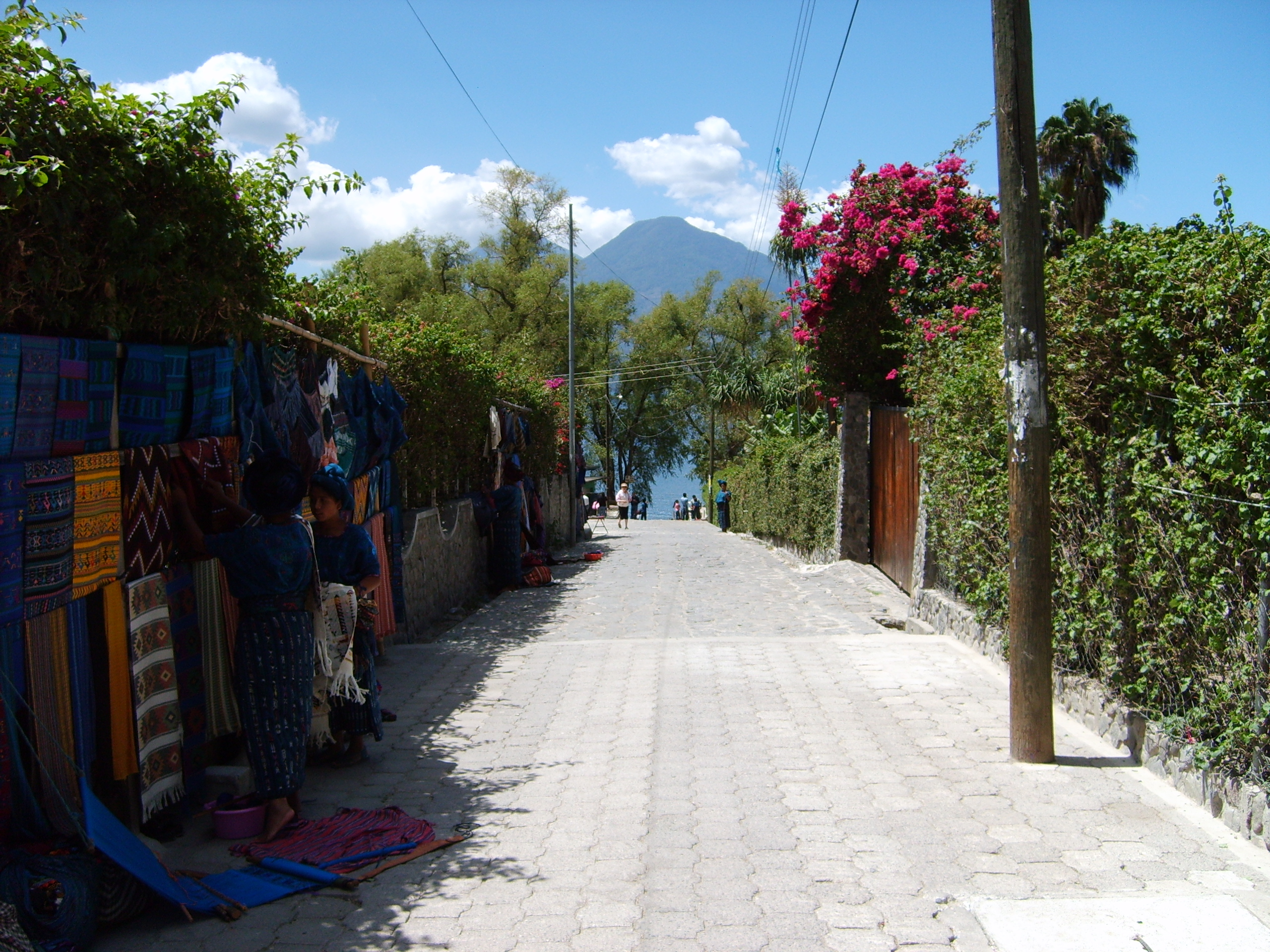
- Street in Santa Catarina Palopó leading to Lake Atitlán

- Location in Guatemala
- Coordinates: 14°43′23″N 91°08′06″W
- Country: Guatemala
- Department: Sololá

Area
  - Municipality: 8 km^{2} (3.1 sq mi)
- Elevation: 1,662 m (5,453 ft)

Population
  - Municipality: 5,000
- Time zone: UTC−6
  - Summer (DST): CTZ
- Postal code: 07011
- Area code: 502
- Website: www.santacatarina.palopo.info http://www.santacatarina.gt/home/

Santa Catarina Palopó is a municipality in the Sololá department of Guatemala. The municipality is located on the shores of Lake Atitlán, approximately 3 miles southeast of Panajachel, a popular tourist destination. To its southeast is San Antonio Palopó. The three aforementioned towns are connected by one paved road, which runs directly through Santa Catarina Palopó.

== Demographics ==
The population of Santa Catarina Palopó is approximately 5,000 according to a 2011 census conducted by the town administration. The vast majority of the residents of the town are indigenous, descending from the Kaqchikel Maya. Kaqchikel is the most common language spoken in the village, though Spanish is widely understood. Subsistence agriculture and fishing are the means of survival for most families within the community, however, a recently spurred tourist industry has created a market for souvenir style goods and services. Perhaps the most easily recognizable characteristic of Santa Catarina Palopó is the blue huipil, or blouse, which is worn prominently by the women of the community. Since the huipil has been worn since the 16th century, it may seem to be a particularly indigenous trait, but the blue style is, however, the result of very recent external influences.

Pintando Santa Catarina Palopó is a project located in the town. Its purpose is to paint houses and buildings to improve the appearance of the town. Families choose the base colors and details to paint their houses with. The details depict animals such as deer and birds.

== Climate ==
Santa Catarina Palopó has a tropical climate with stable temperatures throughout the year; (Köppen climate classification: Aw).

Climate data for Santa Catarina Palopó
Month	Jan	Feb	Mar	Apr	May	Jun	Jul	Aug	Sep	Oct	Nov	Dec	Year
Mean daily maximum °C (°F)	25.7 (78.3)	25.7 (78.3)	26.6 (79.9)	26.1 (79.0)	25.8 (78.4)	23.8 (74.8)	24.8 (76.6)	24.8 (76.6)	24.2 (75.6)	24.5 (76.1)	25.2 (77.4)	25.4 (77.7)	25.2 (77.4)
Daily mean °C (°F)	19.1 (66.4)	18.9 (66.0)	19.8 (67.6)	19.9 (67.8)	20.0 (68.0)	19.3 (66.7)	19.6 (67.3)	19.4 (66.9)	19.1 (66.4)	19.2 (66.6)	19.1 (66.4)	18.8 (65.8)	19.3 (66.8)
Mean daily minimum °C (°F)	12.5 (54.5)	12.1 (53.8)	13.0 (55.4)	13.7 (56.7)	14.3 (57.7)	14.8 (58.6)	14.4 (57.9)	14.1 (57.4)	14.0 (57.2)	13.9 (57.0)	13.1 (55.6)	12.2 (54.0)	13.5 (56.3)
Average precipitation mm (inches)	2 (0.1)	16 (0.6)	15 (0.6)	49 (1.9)	138 (5.4)	364 (14.3)	184 (7.2)	194 (7.6)	343 (13.5)	190 (7.5)	40 (1.6)	11 (0.4)	1,546 (60.7)
Source: Climate-Data.org

== Things to do ==
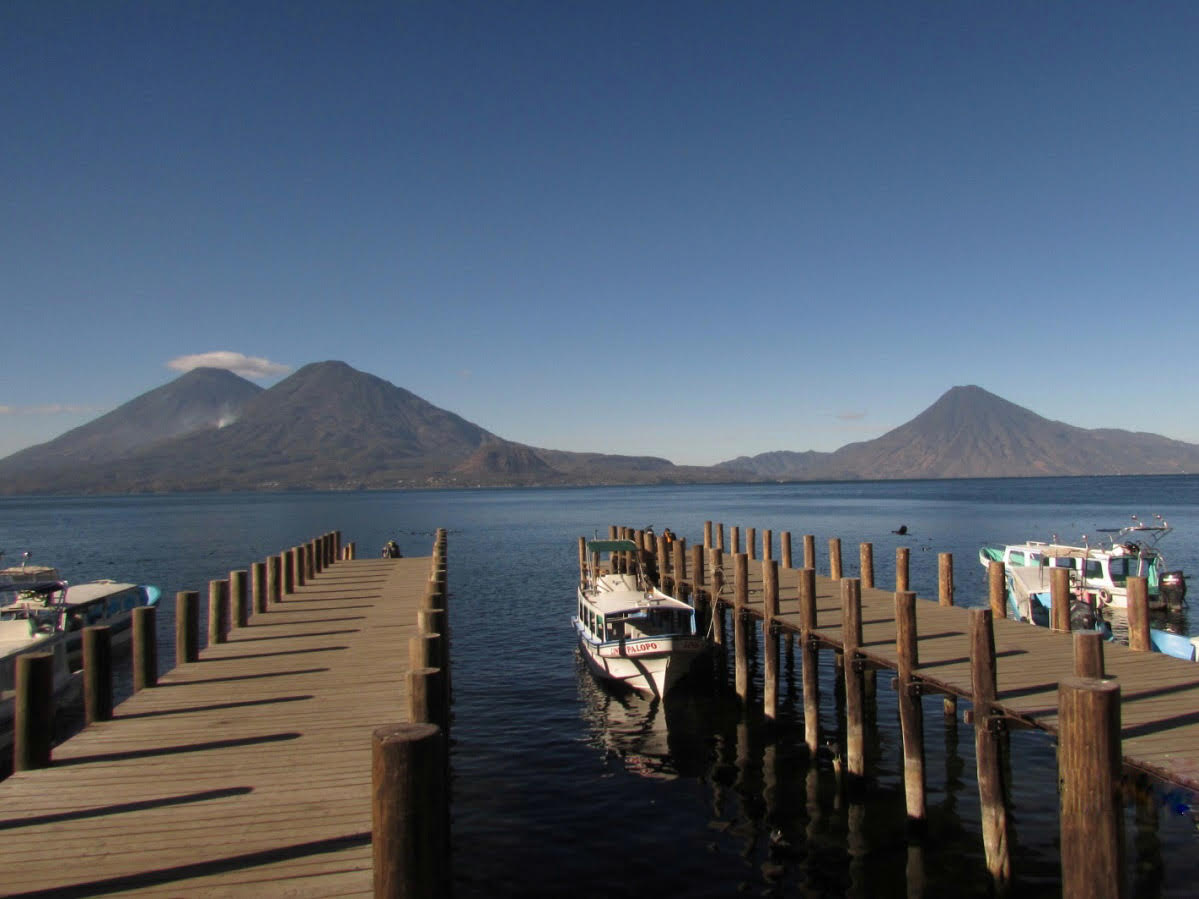
Lake Atitlán view from Santa Catarina

Despite its small size there are some sights to visit in Santa Catarina. The village has a museum which shows the culture of the place. Inside the village is a Confraternity, that is presenting information about the Guatemalan Catholic saints. On the Church Plaza, which is the main square, locally produced coffee is being sold. Multiple restaurants are located around the main street, especially close to the Hotel Villa Santa Catarina, that is located close to the lake and the pier. Furthermore, the village has various street shops selling traditional Kaqchikel clothes, which is one of the main sources of income for the locals.

Semiotically, these traditional Kaqchikel textiles feature complex brocaded geometric motifs —such as double-headed eagles, birds, and water lines— that structurally map ancestral lineages and the community's ecological relationship with the Lake Atitlán basin.

From the pier, the lake and the three volcanoes can be seen, especially in the early morning, just after the sunrise, when the weather is very clear.
