= Patzicía =

- Municipality and town
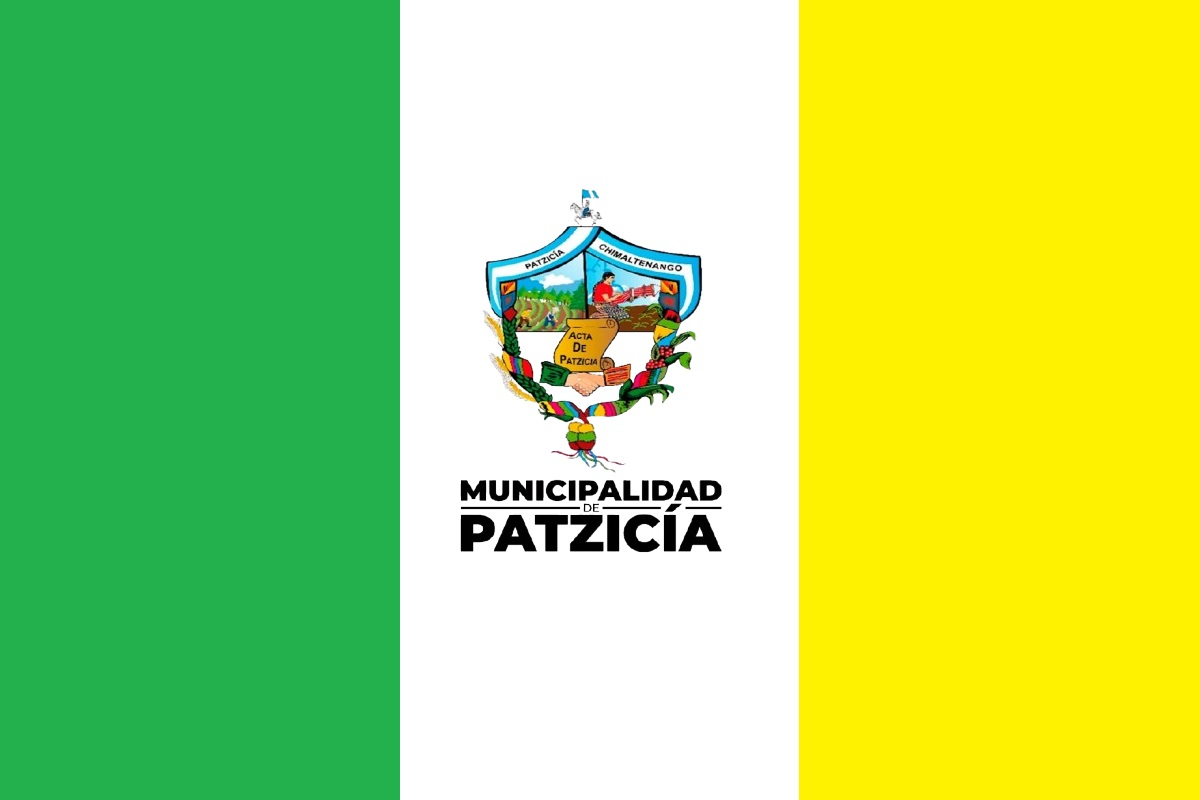
- Flag

- Location within Guatemala
- Coordinates: 14°37′54″N 90°55′37″W
- Country: Guatemala
- Department: Chimaltenango

Area
  - Total: 26.97 sq mi (69.86 km^{2})

Population (2023)
  - Total: 41,571
  - Density: 1,541/sq mi (595.1/km^{2})
- Time zone: UTC+6 (Central Time)

Patzicía (Spanish pronunciation: [patsiˈsi.a]) is a city and a municipality in the Chimaltenango department of Guatemala. It covers an area of approximately 69.86 km^{2} (26.97 sq mi). As per 2023 estimates, it has a population of about 41,571 inhabitants.

== History ==
Patzicía was inhabited by the Apotzoil people, part of the Kaqchikel ethnic group, since at least the 12th century CE. The word Patzicía comes from the Kaqchikel language, with tz'i'ya' meaning "water dog" (literally "dog-water") with a relational noun "pa"; the name of the settlement might have been derived from the nearby Tziyá River. It was recognized as settlement during the Spanish colonization in 1545. The Franciscan missionaries constructed a church, which was later destroyed by earthquake. During the Spanish colonial period, it was listed as "James of the Knights of Patzicia" in the Kingdom of Goathemala (Guatemala).

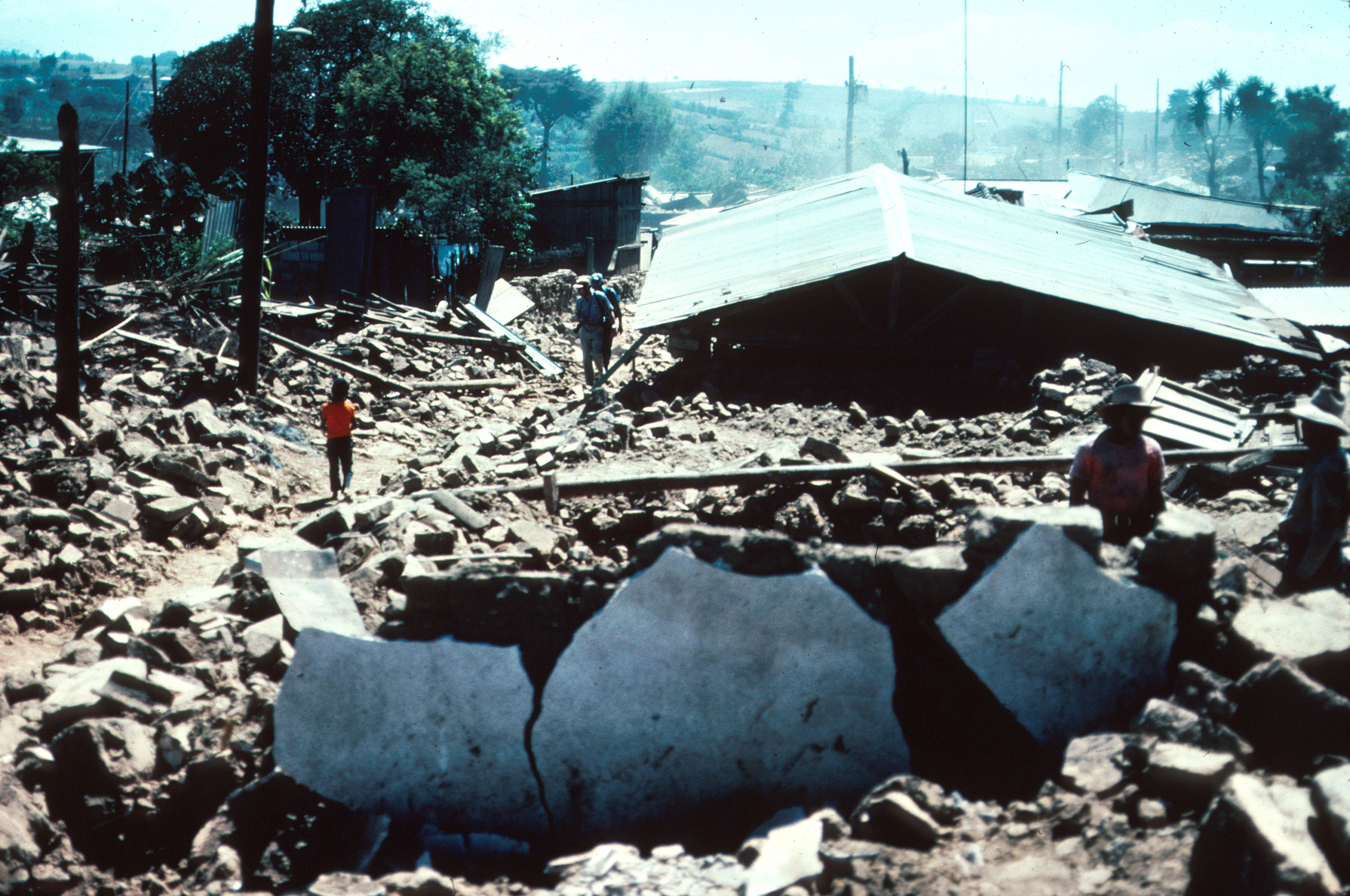
Patzicía after the 1976 earthquake

In March 1871, Miguel García Granados and Justo Rufino Barrios invaded Guatemala from Mexico, and arrived in Patzicía on 3 June 1871. The Patzice Act was signed, which deposed president Vicente Cerna y Cerna and proclaimed Granados as the president of Guatemala. This municipality has suffered several earthquakes over the past, with major incidents in 1942, 1976, and 1988.

== Geography ==
Patzicía is a municipality in the Chimaltenango Department in Guatemala. It is spread over an area of 165.5 km^{2} (63.9 sq mi). It is located in the central part of the Kaqchikel region, about 16 km (9.9 mi) from the departmental capital of Chimaltenango and 68 km (42 mi) from the national capital of Guatemala city. It borders the municipalities of Santa Cruz Balanyá to the north, San Andrés Itzapa and Acatenango to the south, Zaragoza to the east, and Patzún to the west.

Located at an elevation of 1,810.62 m (5,940.4 ft) above sea level, Patzicía has a tropical monsoon climate (Köppen climate classification: Am). The municipality has an average annual temperature of 19.49 °C (67.08 °F), and receives about 135.28 mm (5.326 in) of rainfall annually.

== Demographics ==
The municipality had an estimated population of 41,571 inhabitants in 2023. The population consisted of 21,136 males and 20,435 females. About 29.1% of the population was below the age of fourteen, and 4.6% was over the age of 65 years. Majority of the population (64%) was classified as urban, while 36% lived in rural areas. About 89.2% of the inhabitants were born in the same municipality. Maya (90.4%) formed the major ethnic group, with Ladinos (9.5%) forming a significant minority. The municipality had a literacy rate of 83.7%, and Spanish (76.3%) was the most spoken language.
