= José Miculax Bux =

Guatemalan serial killer

- Born: José María Miculax Bux; 1925; Patzicía, Guatemala
- Died: July 18, 1946 (aged 21); Guatemala
- Cause of death: Executed by firing squad
- Other name: The Monster of Guatemala
- Conviction: Murder
- Penalty: Death

Details
- Victims: 15
- Span of crimes: January 1946 – April 1946
- Country: Guatemala
- Date apprehended: April 26, 1946

José María Miculax Bux (1925 – July 18, 1946), also known as the "El Monstruo de Guatemala" ("The Monster of Guatemala"), was a Guatemalan serial killer who was executed on July 18, 1946.

== Biography ==
José Miculax Bux was born in 1925 in Patzicía, Guatemala.

From January 1946 to April 1946, Miculax Bux and his cousin Mariano Macú Miculax killed fifteen boys aged ten to sixteen. The victims were sodomized and strangled to death after having their hands and neck bound by a rope.

Miculax Bux was arrested on April 26, 1946, after a description was given by an old woman and Mariano was arrested on April 27 in Antigua after two prior false arrests were made. Miculax Bux confessed to the murders but Mariano denied them. Miculax Bux was sentenced to death on June 18, 1946, and Mariano was sentenced to 30 years in prison with hard labor.

Miculax Bux was publicly executed by firing squad on July 18, 1946. His body, whose head had been kept at the Universidad de San Carlos de Guatemala for medical study, was stolen in the 1990s.

== Victims ==
- Enrique Sactic Cuyuch, 14, body found on February 23, 1946.
- Oscar Emilio López, 12, found on March 15.
- Cesar Augusto Bolfovich, 13, found on March 28.
- Unidentified, 11, found before April 5.
- Francisco Juárez Ajvix, found on April 5.
- Gumersindo Flores, 14, found on April 5.
- Jesús Reyes, found on April 17.
- Cecilio Uyú Pirir, 13, found on April 18.
- Unidentified, 15, found between April 15 and April 18.
- Unidentified, 13 to 16, found on April 21.
- Unidentified, found on April 22.
- Nicolás Antonio Gómez Reyes.
- Juan Lorenzo Iboy, missing since April 25.
- Rolando Castillo.
