= San José Poaquil =

- Municipality and town
- Location within Guatemala
- Coordinates: 14°49′N 90°54′W
- Country: Guatemala
- Department: Chimaltenango

Area
  - Municipality and town: 31.67 sq mi (82.03 km^{2})

Population (2023)
  - Municipality and town: 34,400
  - Density: 1,090/sq mi (419/km^{2})
  - Urban: 9,726
- Time zone: UTC+6 (Central Time)

San José Poaquil is a city and a municipality in the Chimaltenango department of Guatemala. It covers an area of approximately 82.03 km^{2} (31.67 sq mi). As per 2023 estimates, it has a population of about 34,400 inhabitants.

== History ==
Poaquil was derived from indigenous language and might mean "wetland" or "between swamps." It might also refer to "gold" as there were gold deposits in the local rivers that were exploited during colonial times. The prefix "San José" was added during the Spanish colonial time.

San José Poaquil was initially a village in San Juan Comalapa, called Hacienda de San Juan. It was originally a cattle-raising farm, intended to deliver beef weekly to San Juan Comalapa for the municipal corporation and the mayor. The inhabitants were unhappy with the authorities of San Juan Comalapa, as they received no recognition and were treated almost like slaves. The community demanded independence from San Juan Comalapa. San José Poaquil was officially created as a municipality by government decree on 1 November 1891, within the department of Chimaltenango.

== Geography ==
San José Poaquil is a municipality in the Chimaltenango Department in Guatemala. It is spread over an area of 82.03 km^{2} (31.67 sq mi). The municipality is bordered by the municipalities of Joyabaj to the north, San Martín Jilotepeque to the east, San Juan Comalapa to the south, and Tecpán Guatemala and Santa Apolonia to the west.

Located at an elevation of 1,810.62 m (5,940.4 ft) above sea level, San José Poaquil has a tropical monsoon climate (Köppen climate classification: Am). The municipality has an average annual temperature of 20.06 °C (68.11 °F) and receives about 139.29 mm (5.484 in) of rainfall annually.

== Demographics ==
The municipality had an estimated population of 34,400 inhabitants in 2023. The population consisted of 17,292 males and 17,108 females. About 29.3% of the population was below the age of fourteen, and 4.4% was over the age of 65 years. Majority of the population (63.8%) was classified as urban, while 36.2% lived in rural areas. About 94.9% of the inhabitants were born in the same municipality. Maya (96.2%) formed the major ethnic group, with Ladinos (2.8%) forming a small minority. The municipality had a literacy rate of 81.3%, and Kaqchikel (80.9%) was the most spoken language.
