= Pochuta =

- Municipality and town

- Location in Guatemala
- Coordinates: 14°32′42″N 91°05′20″W
- Country: Guatemala
- Department: Chimaltenango

Area
  - Total: 49 sq mi (128 km^{2})
- Elevation: 3,005 ft (916 m)

Population (2023)
  - Total: 11,365
- Time zone: UTC+6 (Central Time)

Pochuta is a city and a municipality in the Chimaltenango department of Guatemala. It covers an area of approximately 128 km^{2} (49 sq mi). As per 2023 estimates, it has a population of about 11,365 inhabitants.

== History ==
Pochuta was earlier known as Caprera, and was part of Patzún. Caprera was elevated as a municipality on 6 July 1882, and adopted the name "Pochuta". As an honor to the patron San Miguel, it was known as "San Miguel Pochuta". Pochuta is derived from Nahuatl word "pachut: or "pochotl" meaning "place of thorns".

== Geography ==
Pochuta is a municipality in the Chimaltenango Department in Guatemala. It is spread over an area of 128 km^{2} (49 sq mi). It borders the municipality of Patzún, Chimaltenango to the north; to the south with the municipalities of Patzún to the north, Patulul to the south, Acatenango and Yepocapa to the east, San Lucas Tolimán to the west.

Located at an elevation of 1,810.62 m (5,940.4 ft) above sea level, Pochuta has a tropical monsoon climate (Köppen climate classification: Am). The municipality has an average annual temperature of 21.5 °C (70.7 °F), and receives about 149.25 mm (5.876 in) of rainfall annually.

== Demographics ==
The municipality had an estimated population of 11,365 inhabitants in 2023. The population consisted of 5,808 males and 5,557 females. About 30.3% of the population was below the age of fourteen, and 5.8% was over the age of 65 years. Majority of the population (51.4%) was classified as urban, while 48.6% lived in rural areas. About 79.5% of the inhabitants were born in the same municipality. Ladinos (72.2%) formed the major ethnic group, with Maya (27.3%) forming a significant minority. The municipality had a literacy rate of 80.0%, and Spanish (85.1%) was the most spoken language.

== See also ==
- List of places in Guatemala
