= Our Elders Teach Us =

Our Elders Teach Us is a book by David Carey, professor of History at the University of Southern Maine. It outlines a detailed history of the people of Latin America, particularly the Kaqchikel of Guatemala.

Oral histories are a key component of this discussion wherein they represent a compelling alternative of history composed primarily of the "victors."

Preservation of both human and natural resources, i.e. sustainability, is another critical point of Our Elders Teach Us.
