= San Antonio Palopó =

- Municipality and village
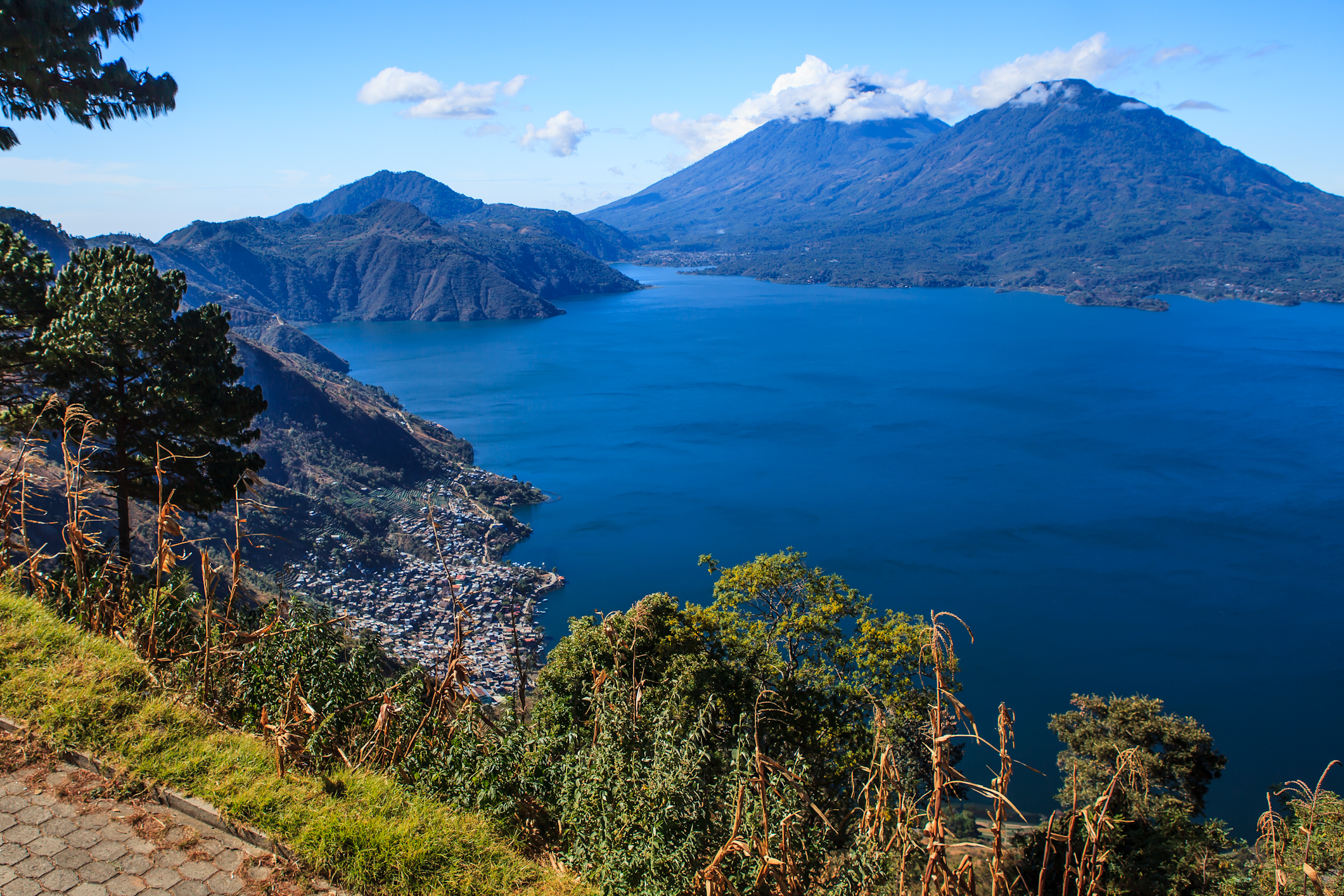
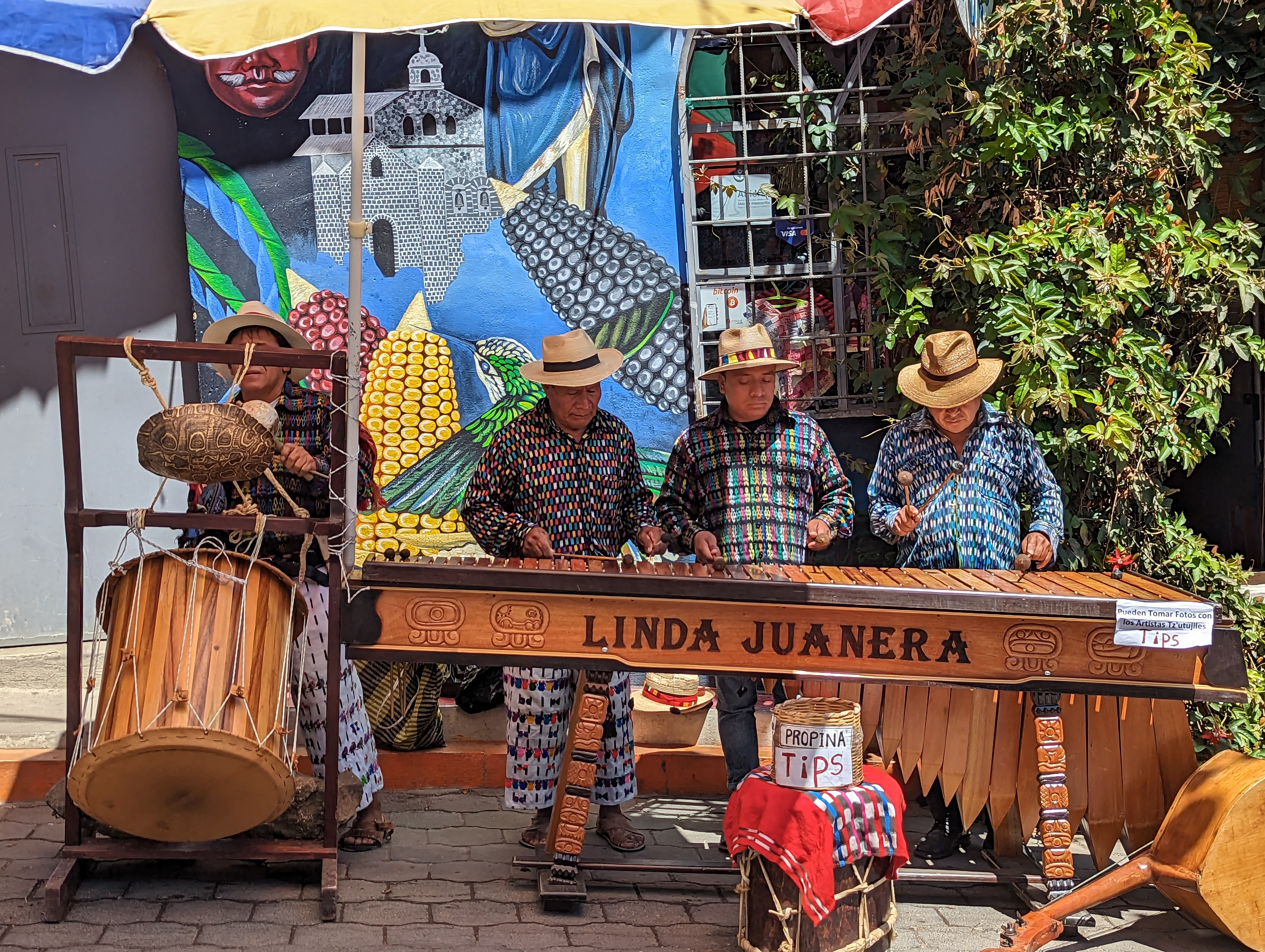
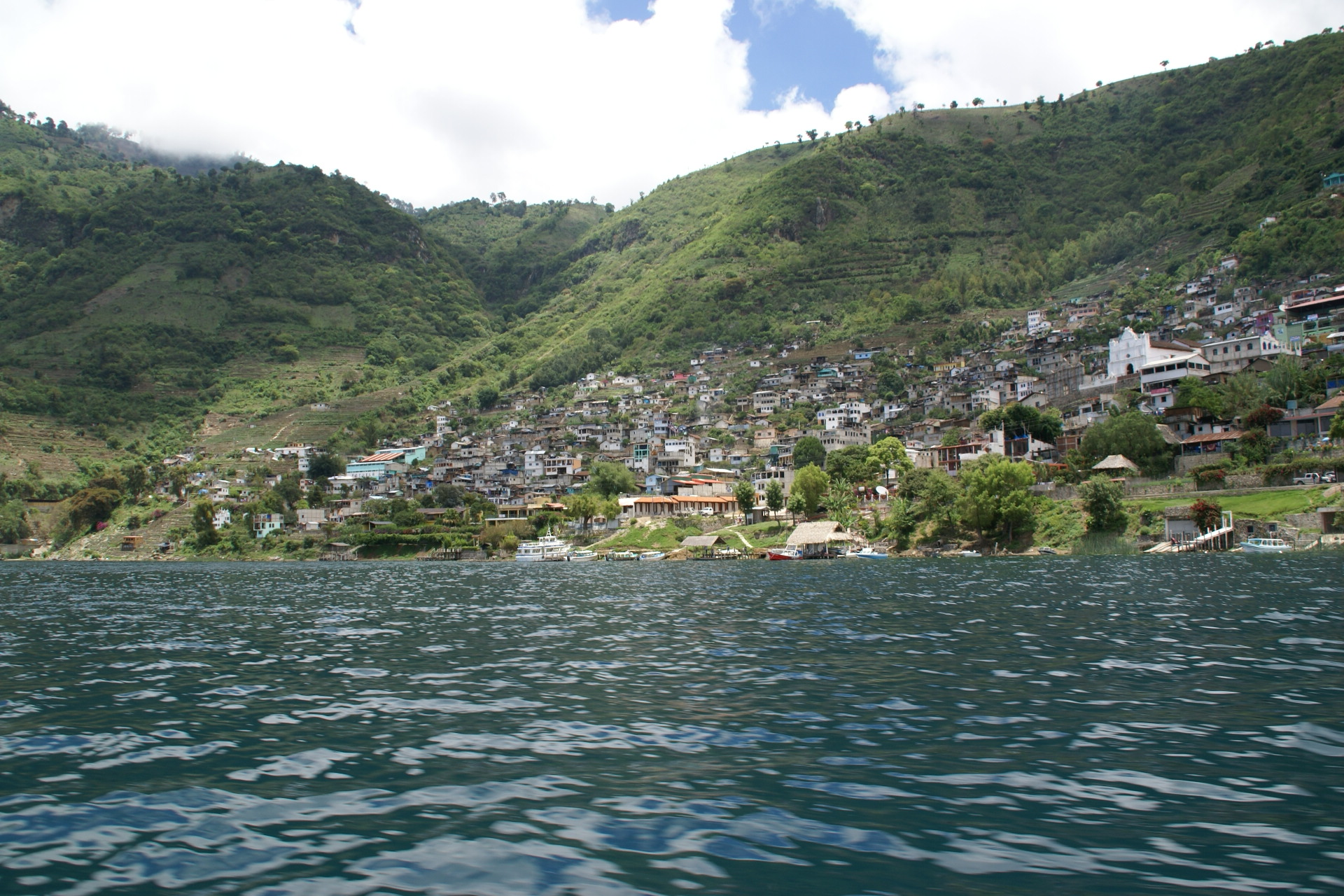
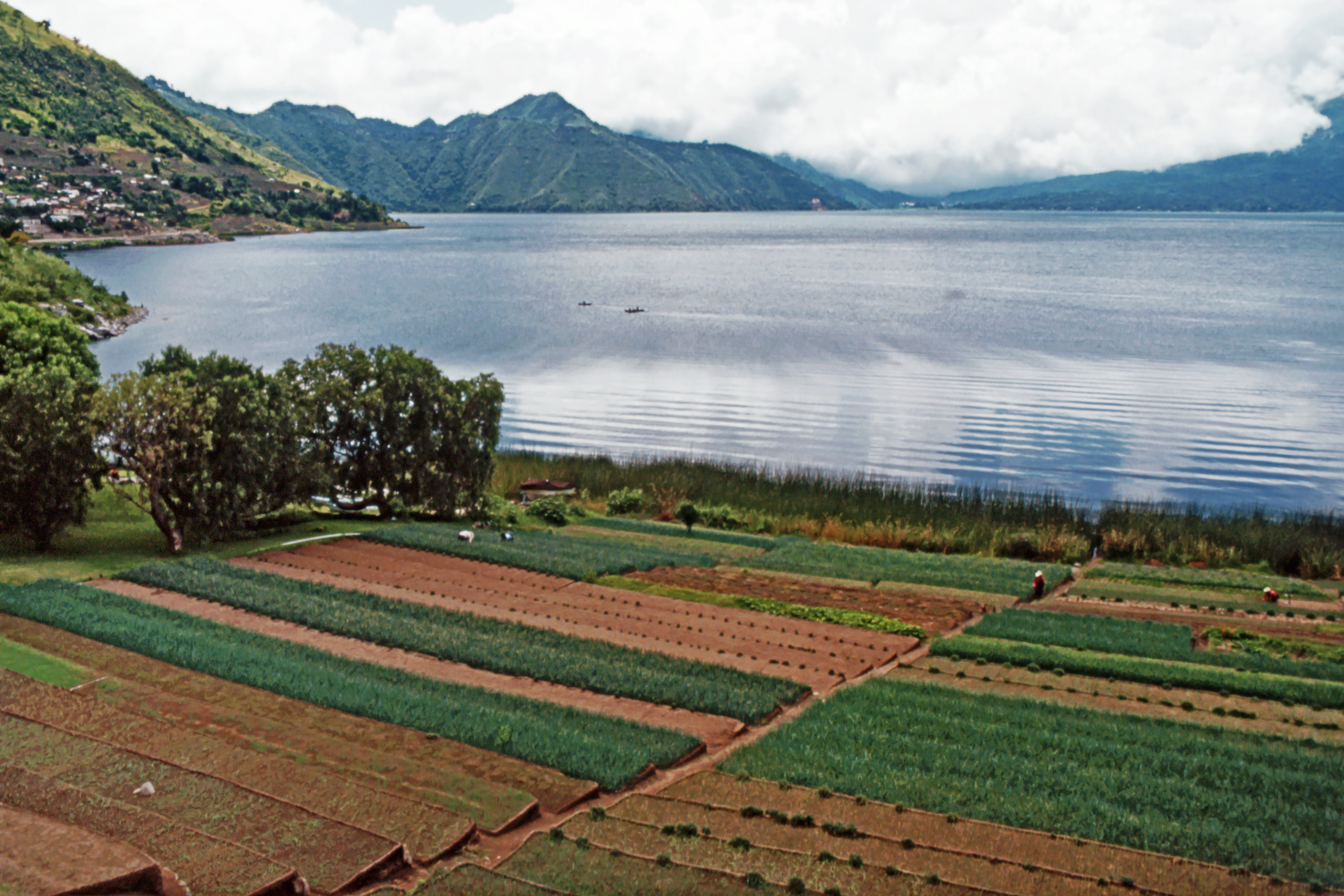
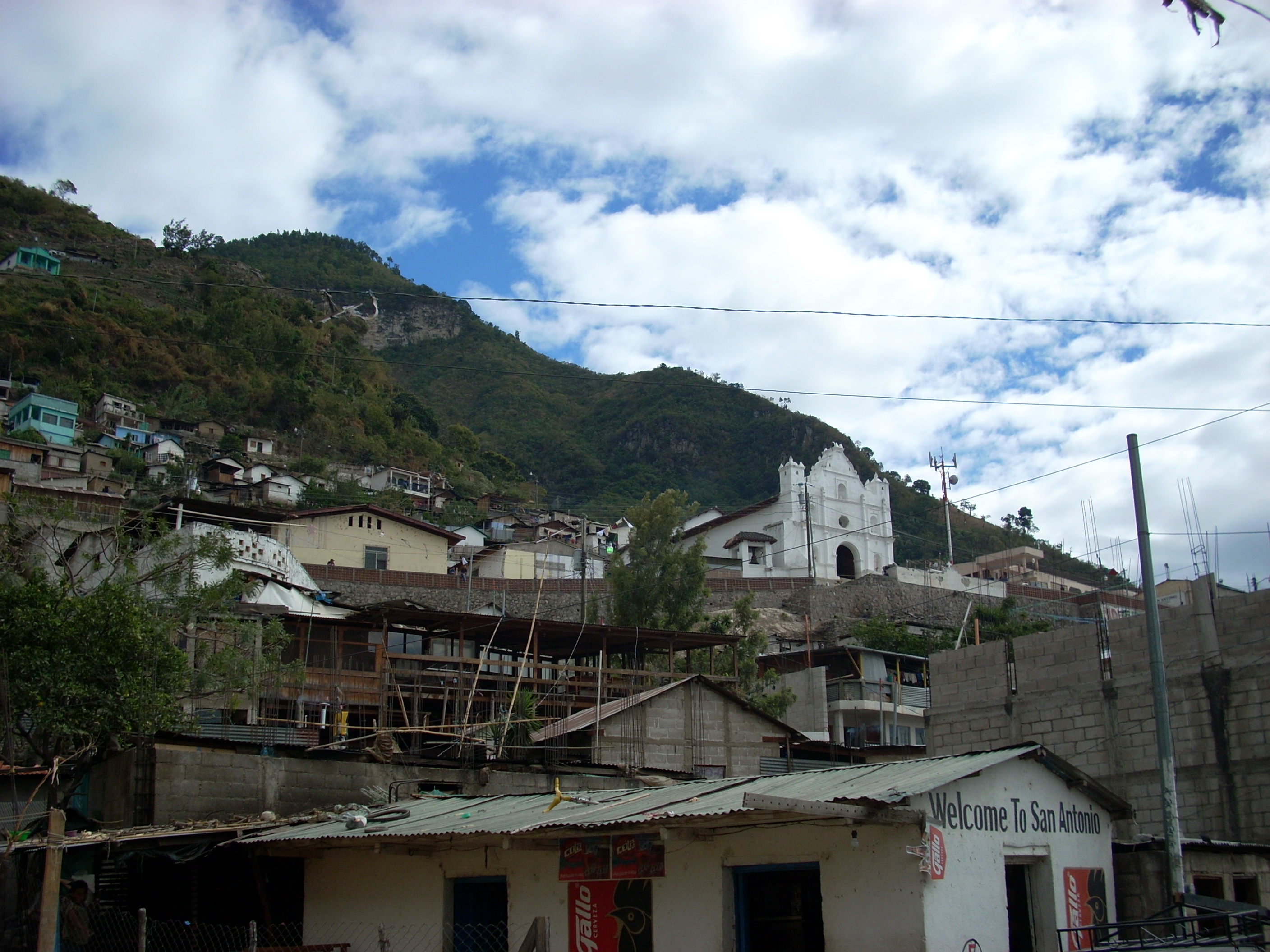
- From top, left to right: View of San Antonio Palopo and Lake Atitlán • The marimba in San Antonio Palopo • Another panoramic view of San Antonio Palopo • Agriculture in San Antonio Palopo • The town and Central Park

- location of San Antonio Palopó in Guatemala
- Coordinates: 14°42′N 91°7′W
- Country: Guatemala
- Department: Sololá
- Named for: St. Anthony of Padua

Government
  - Type: Municipal
  - Mayor (2016-2020): Francisco Calabajay Díaz
- Lowest elevation: 1,562 m (5,125 ft)

Population (2018)
  - Total: 15,362
- Time zone: UTC-6 (Central Time)
- Country calling code: 502
- Climate: Cwb

San Antonio Palopó is a municipality in the Sololá Department of Guatemala, situated along the steep volcanic slopes on the eastern shore of Lake Atitlán. Rising from a shoreline elevation of 1,562 metres (5,125 ft), the town's urban layout is characterized by terraced architecture built on rugged terrain. The population is predominantly Kaqchikel Maya, renowned for maintaining traditional backstrap-loom weaving techniques and distinct indigo-hued textiles. The municipality's patron saint is Saint Anthony of Padua, whose feast day is celebrated annually on 13 June.

== History ==
=== Spanish colony: Franciscan doctrine ===
After the Spanish conquest of Guatemala the town was in charge of the franciscans, who had convents and doctrines in the area covered by the modern departments of Sacatepéquez, Chimaltenango, Sololá, Quetzaltenango, Totonicapán, Suchitepéquez and Escuintla. The "Provincia del Santísimo Nombre de Jesús" (English:"Province of the most Holy Name of Jesus"), as the Franciscan area was then called, reached up to 24 convents by 1700.

The franciscans tried to have daily religious teaching for 6-year-old girls and older starting at 2:00 pm and for boys of the same age starting at sunset; the class lasted for 2 hours and consisted on memorizing the church teaching and prayers and to make some exercises with the catechism and it was run by a priest or by elder natives, called "fiscales". Adults attended Mass every Sunday and holiday and after mass, there were religious teachings in their own language.

Lent was a time of the year when the friars prepared the natives thoroughly, using their own language to accomplish their goals; every Friday of Lent there was a procession following the Rosary steps all the way to the Calvary temple.

In 1754, as part of the borbon reforms, the Franciscans were forced to give their doctrines to the secular clergy; thus, when archbishop Pedro Cortés y Larraz visited town in 1770, he described it as part of the "San Francisco Panajachel parish".

=== 1892 archeologist Alfred P. Maudslay visit ===
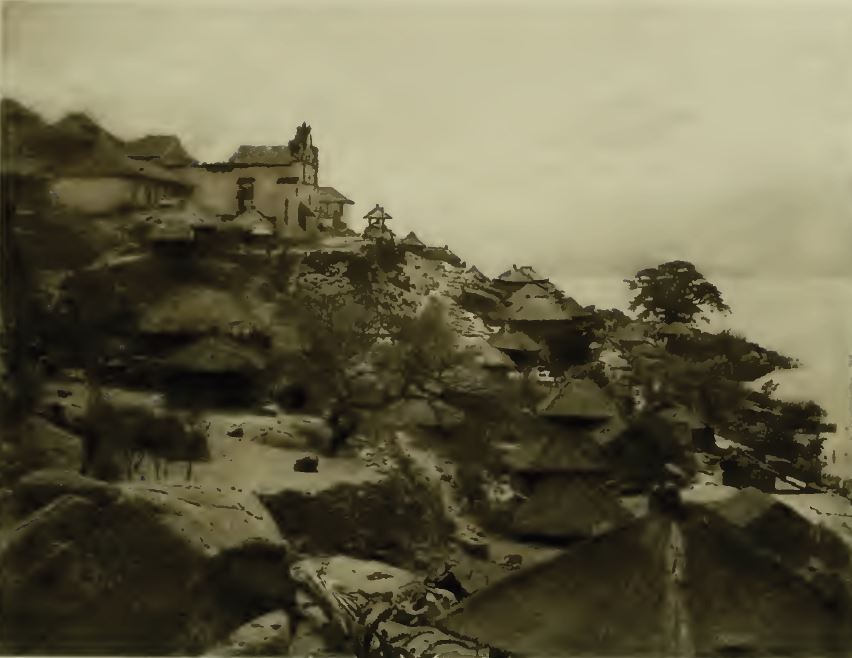
A view of San Antonio Palopó in 1895. Photograph by Alfred Percival Maudslay.

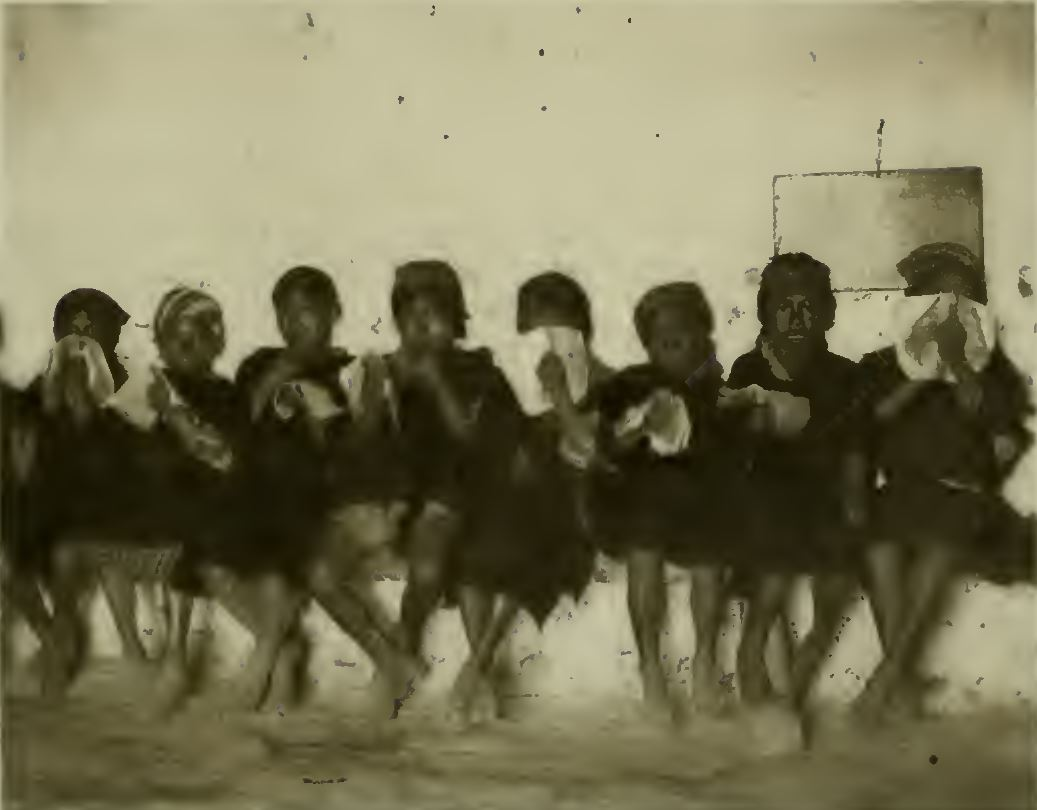
School children from San Antonio Palopó in 1895. Children attended school three hours a day, even though they did not know any Spanish and their ladino teacher did not know their native language. Photograph by Alfred Percival Maudslay.

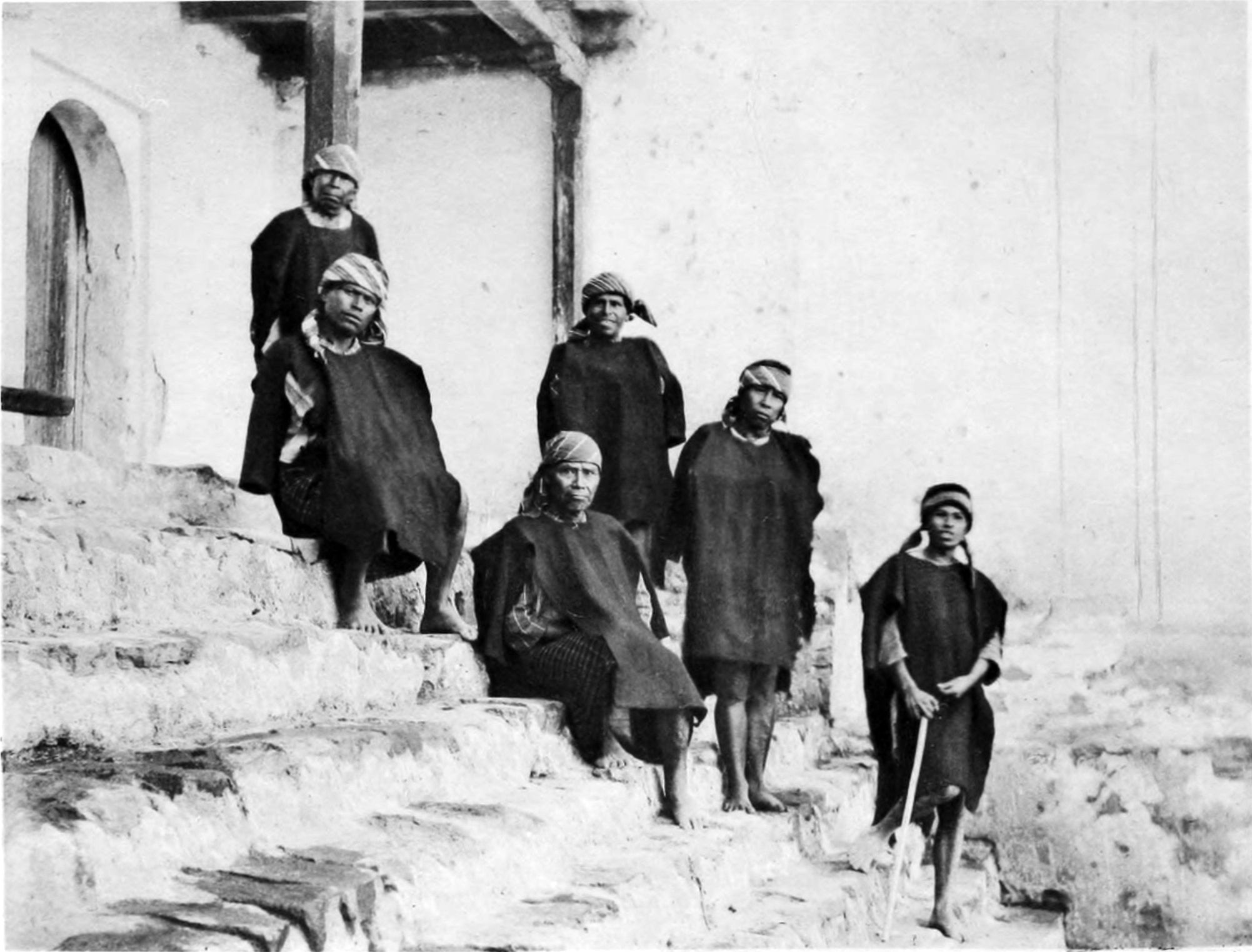
Men from San Antonio Palopó in 1895; due to their reluctance to have their picture taken, Maudslay and his wife had to beg this group to have the picture made.

In 1892, British archeologist Alfred Percival Maudslay and his wife Anne Maudslay visited Guatemala and traveled throughout it on mules, arriving to San Antonio Palopó on their way through Sololá; Anne Maudslay's impressions were recorded in her book A glimpse at Guatemala where tells how, in order to reach Panajachel coming from Chimaltenango, they had to go down a very steep path, forcing them to send their belongings ahead with several natives who were used to the path, while they took a longer way with their mules. Once they reached Lake Atitlan level, the climb a small hill to get to the native town of San Antonio.

The Maudslays climbed the steep street towards town hall, where they intended to spend the night but found out that the corridors were already crowded with native travelers and their cargo; when they inquired about the building rooms, they found out that there were only two: one that was used as prison and was crowded with prisoners, and one that was used for municipal business. They had to look for another shelter, and finally found it in the local school, where they were allowed to spend the night in the girls classroom, which had no windows and no lights. While searching for a place to stay the nights, they noticed that the local church had no roofing, as a results of the periodic earthquakes that affect the area.

The year the Maudslays visited town, there were only five ladinos living in it: the school teacher and his wife, the municipality secretary and two ladies that had a small grocery shop; everybody else was native Guatemalan, and even the municipality was completely led by native people. Due to the rise of coffee plantations in those years, a road had just been built, to shorten the travel time from the south shores of Guatemala to Quetzaltenango, thus, bringing San Antonio Palopó out of it partial isolation; nevertheless, Anne Maudslay found strange that both women and girls would flee shyly after glancing at them, and were reluctant to have their pictures taken. In spite of that, the Maudslay could observe that the female population was clean and tidy with their clothes, and numerous women were by the lake shore washing their hair.

There was another custom that the Maudslays observed: since it was Sunday, all the municipality authorities were out in a procession, going house by house talking to their constituents about the business for the upcoming days: dressed with their black clothes and their mayoral sticks, theirs was a solemn procession; once all the houses had been notified, one of the men shouted some more instructions that were repeated in farther locations for two or three times and with that, the group dissolved.

Since they were staying at the town school, they could see a class: little boys showed up early, dressed exactly like their parents with the difference that the red handkerchief on their heads looked older and seemed to have been passed from fathers to sons; the kids put literally their faces in their books, too shy to see the visitors until the teacher came and took roll call. After that, the teacher stepped out and the children went back to their book, for the next three hours, as the teacher could not speak their language and they did not know any Spanish. That day there was not class for the girls, who were dismissed because the visitors were staying at their class.

Like other native towns that they had visited, the Maudslay reported that the clothing the people used was all handcrafted and made in their own homes using primitive systems, similar to those pictured in the Codex Mendoza, who Alfred Maudslay had seen back in England.

== Administrative division ==
The municipality has an area of 34 km² and one municipal capital, two villages, five settlements and three neighborhoods.

San Antonio Palopó's administrative division
Administrative location	List
Municipal capital	San Antonio Palopó
Villages	Agua Escondida; Xequistel
Settlements	Cuiquistel; Cuisajcap; El Porvenir Chipop; Patzaj; San José Xiquinabaj
Neighborhoods	Chitulul; Ojo de Agua; Tzampetey; El Naranjo; Tzancorral; San Gabriel

== Climate ==
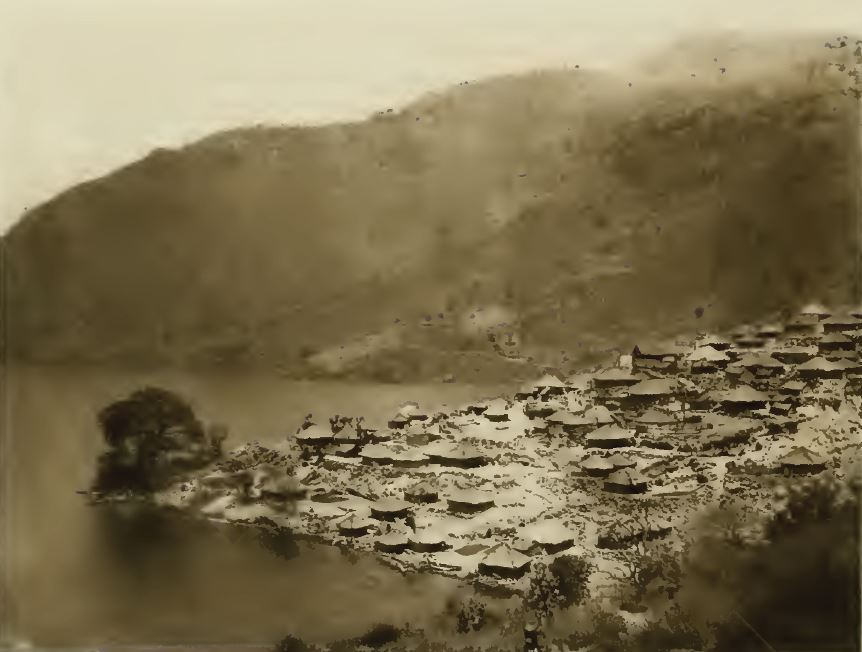
San Antonio Palopó in 1895. Photograph by Alfred Percival Maudslay.

San Antonio Palopó has temperate climate (Köppen: Csb).

Climate data for San Antonio Palopó
Month	Jan	Feb	Mar	Apr	May	Jun	Jul	Aug	Sep	Oct	Nov	Dec	Year
Mean daily maximum °C (°F)	22.6 (72.7)	23.0 (73.4)	24.2 (75.6)	24.4 (75.9)	24.2 (75.6)	22.1 (71.8)	22.9 (73.2)	22.3 (72.1)	22.6 (72.7)	22.6 (72.7)	22.7 (72.9)	22.4 (72.3)	23.0 (73.4)
Daily mean °C (°F)	16.2 (61.2)	16.3 (61.3)	17.4 (63.3)	18.2 (64.8)	18.7 (65.7)	17.7 (63.9)	18.0 (64.4)	18.0 (64.4)	17.7 (63.9)	17.5 (63.5)	16.8 (62.2)	16.1 (61.0)	17.4 (63.3)
Mean daily minimum °C (°F)	9.8 (49.6)	9.6 (49.3)	10.7 (51.3)	12.1 (53.8)	13.2 (55.8)	13.4 (56.1)	13.1 (55.6)	12.7 (54.9)	12.8 (55.0)	12.5 (54.5)	11.0 (51.8)	9.8 (49.6)	11.7 (53.1)
Average precipitation mm (inches)	1 (0.0)	7 (0.3)	6 (0.2)	30 (1.2)	102 (4.0)	298 (11.7)	168 (6.6)	168 (6.6)	304 (12.0)	156 (6.1)	44 (1.7)	7 (0.3)	1,291 (50.7)
Source: Climate-Data.org

== Geographic location ==
San Antonio is located 27 km south of Sololá, the department capital and 158 km west of Guatemala City. It is surrounded by Sololá Department municipalities, except on the east, where it borders Patzún, a Chimaltenango Department municipality.

== See also ==
- List of places in Guatemala
