= San Andrés Semetabaj =

- Location in Guatemala
- Coordinates: 14°44′42″N 91°08′06″W
- Country: Guatemala
- Department: Sololá
- Municipality: San Andrés Semetabaj

Government
  - Mayor: Gaspar Chumil Morales (URNG-MAIZ)

Population (Census 2002)
  - Religions: Roman Catholicism Evangelicalism Maya
- Climate: Csb

San Andrés Semetabaj (Spanish pronunciation: [san anˈdɾes semetaˈβax]) is a municipality in the Sololá department of Guatemala. According to Jorge Luis Arriola's Geonimias de Guatemala (English:Name origins of geographic locations in Guatemala), Semetabaj means "stone of glass-like appearance" and originates from the Spanish word "semet", which means : bottle or flask and, by extension, glass, and by the k'akch'iquel "abaj" which means "stone". Originally, it was called San Andrés Limetabaj.

== History ==
The oldest reference of San Andrés Semetabaj after the Spanish conquest of Guatemala is in the Franciscan convent report written by friar Francisco de Zuasa in 1689, who said that San Andrés Semetabaj was a small town under the jurisdiction of the convent in Panajachel, with population 315 (297 natives and 18 criollos).

In his Descripción Geográfico-Moral de la Diósesis de Goathemala (English:Moral-geographic description of the Guatemalan diocese), archbishop Pedro Cortés y Larraz, written in 1770 after his ecclesiastical visit to his new archidiocese, talks about the San Andrés Tzemetabah town, which, with a population of 320 people was an annex to the San Francisco Panajachel parish.

== Annual fair ==
The annual fair in honor to Saint Andrew Apostle takes places during the last five days of November, being the main day 30 November, the celebration of the Apostle.

== Climate ==
San Andrés Semetabaj has temperate climate (Köppen: Csb).

Climate data for San Andrés Semetabaj
Month	Jan	Feb	Mar	Apr	May	Jun	Jul	Aug	Sep	Oct	Nov	Dec	Year
Mean daily maximum °C (°F)	21.7 (71.1)	22.1 (71.8)	23.4 (74.1)	24.0 (75.2)	23.6 (74.5)	21.6 (70.9)	22.4 (72.3)	22.9 (73.2)	22.2 (72.0)	22.1 (71.8)	22.0 (71.6)	21.6 (70.9)	22.5 (72.5)
Daily mean °C (°F)	15.4 (59.7)	15.4 (59.7)	16.7 (62.1)	17.8 (64.0)	18.2 (64.8)	17.2 (63.0)	17.5 (63.5)	17.6 (63.7)	17.2 (63.0)	17.1 (62.8)	16.1 (61.0)	15.3 (59.5)	16.8 (62.2)
Mean daily minimum °C (°F)	9.1 (48.4)	8.8 (47.8)	10.0 (50.0)	11.6 (52.9)	12.8 (55.0)	12.9 (55.2)	12.7 (54.9)	12.3 (54.1)	12.3 (54.1)	12.1 (53.8)	10.3 (50.5)	9.1 (48.4)	11.2 (52.1)
Average precipitation mm (inches)	0 (0)	5 (0.2)	5 (0.2)	24 (0.9)	87 (3.4)	283 (11.1)	166 (6.5)	162 (6.4)	306 (12.0)	152 (6.0)	50 (2.0)	6 (0.2)	1,246 (48.9)
Source: Climate-Data.org; Instituto Nacional de Sismología, Vulcanología, Meteorología e Hidrología de Guatemala

== Geographic location ==
The municipal capital is 1945 m above sea level.

The municipal capital is reachable through a paved road and through the "Las Trampas" access road, which merges with the CA1 highway (Inter American Highway, km 117) and has a length of 22 km. Guatemala City is 143 km away from San Andrés Semetabaj to the East.

== See also ==
- List of places in Guatemala

== Notes and references ==
=== Bibliography ===
- Cortés y Larraz, Pedro (1770). Descripción Geográfico-Moral de la Diócesis de Goathemala (in Spanish). Guatemala: Diócesis de Guatemala.
