= Comalapa =

Comalapa is a compound Nahuatl word derived from comalli ("griddle")+"apa" ("place of"), it may refer to any of the following geographical locations:

- El Salvador
  - Comalapa, Chalatenango, El Salvador
  - Comalapa, La Paz, location of the Comalapa International Airport, in La Paz Department
  - Comalapa River, river in the La Paz Department of El Salvador
- Guatemala
  - San Juan Comalapa, Chimaltenango
- Mexico
  - Frontera Comalapa
  - Comalapa, River in Mexico
- Nicaragua
  - Comalapa, Chontales, Departamento de Chontales
