= San Andrés Itzapa =

- Municipality and town
- Location in Guatemala
- Coordinates: 14°37′N 90°51′W
- Country: Guatemala
- Department: Chimaltenango
- Established: 1624

Government
  - Major (2016-2020): Hugo Israel Guch Ajpuac

Area
  - Total: 24.6 sq mi (63.7 km^{2})

Population (2018 census)
  - Total: 32,083
  - Density: 1,300/sq mi (504/km^{2})
- Demonym: Itzapecos
- Time zone: UTC+6 (Central Time)
- Climate: Cwb

San Andrés Itzapa (Spanish pronunciation: [anˈdɾes itˈsapa]) is a town, with a population of 24,992 (2018 census), and a municipality of Chimaltenango, Guatemala. San Andrés Itzapa is in the eastern region of Chimaltenango, while the district capital lies to the north, Acatenango lies to the south, and Parramos lies to the east . The municipality covers an area of 63.7 km^{2}, with a total population of 32,083.

== Origin of the name ==
San Andrés Itzapa (Itzapa means flint) is an ancient town. The village is mentioned in the Annals of the Cakchiquels, written in 1571. The Spanish named the area "Itzapa y de San Andrés" in honor of their patron saint, the apostle San Andrés (Saint Andrew). The Spanish also called the area "Valle del Durazno" (Valley of the Peaches), as the prickly pears common in this area resembled the orchards of home.

== Organization ==
San Andrés Itzapa administrative organization
| Subdivision | Name | Distance to municipal capital (in km) |
|---|---|---|
| Villages | Chicazanga | 5.4 |
| Villages | Chimachoy | 10.5 |
| Villages | Panimaquin | 7 |
| Villages | San José Calderas | 16.5 |
| Villages | Hierba Buena | 7 |
| Villages | El Aguacate | N/A (Note: Inhabited after the massacre that took place there in 1988 during Guatemala Civil War.) |
| Villages | San José Los Corrales | 7 |
| Villages | Xeparquiy | 5 |
| Villages | San José Cajahualten | 9 |
| Villages | San Rafael | 12.5 |
| Neighborhoods | San Cristóbal | N/A; Located within the municipal capital |
| Neighborhoods | San Pedro y San Pablo | N/A; Located within the municipal capital |
| Neighborhoods | Santísima Trinidad | N/A; Located within the municipal capital |
| Neighborhoods | San Antonio | N/A; Located within the municipal capital |
| Neighborhoods | San Lorenzo Norte | N/A; Located within the municipal capital |
| Neighborhoods | San Lorenzo Sur | N/A; Located within the municipal capital |
| Residential communities | El Edén | N/A; Located within the municipal capital |
| Residential communities | La Primavera | N/A; Located within the municipal capital |
| Residential communities | Las Conchitas | N/A; Located within the municipal capital |
| Residential communities | Colinas de San Andrés | N/A; Located within the municipal capital |
| Residential communities | Canadá | N/A; Located within the municipal capital |
| Residential communities | Navideña | N/A; Located within the municipal capital |
| Residential communities | La Cuchilla | N/A; Located within the municipal capital |
| Residential communities | La Pinada | N/A; Located within the municipal capital |
| Residential communities | Los Encinos | N/A; Located within the municipal capital |
| Residential communities | San Francisco | N/A; Located within the municipal capital |
| Residential communities | El Stan (Note: Built for people affected by Hurricane Stan in 2005.) | N/A; Located within the municipal capital |

== Languages ==
Both Spanish and Kaqchikel are spoken, although migration from other regions has brought an influx of other languages, such as Kʼicheʼ and Tzʼutujil.

== Flora and fauna ==
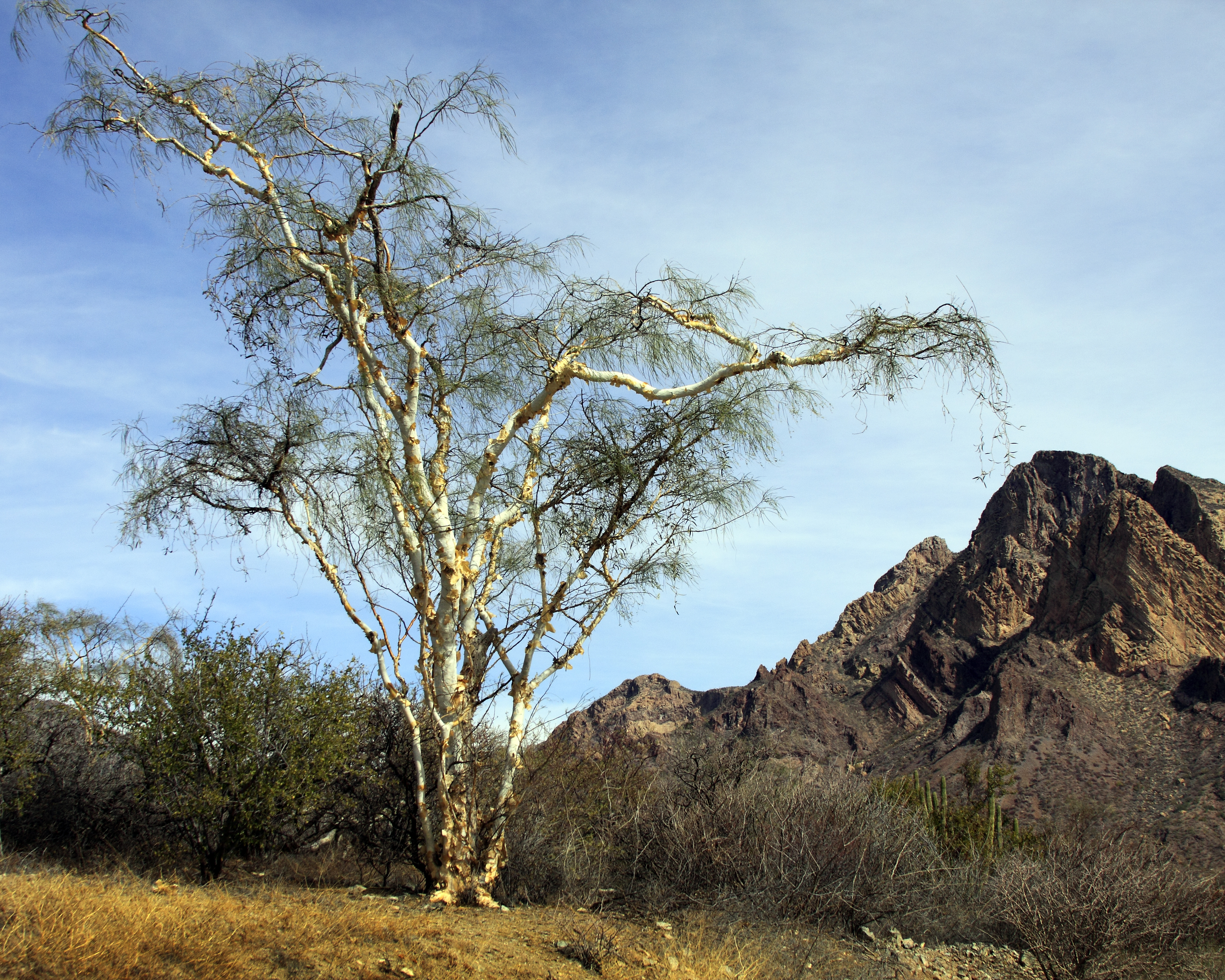
Palo blanco tree

San Andrés Itzapa has several heavily forested areas, which include eucalyptus, poplars, pines, holly, oaks, cypress and other evergreen and deciduous species.

Plants found in San Andrés Itzapa include canaque, casuarina, conacaste, hormigo, gravilea, and palo blanco, as well as varieties of aloe.

Animals include coyote, armadillos, mountain lions, tisote, lynxes, goyoy, kinkajou, squirrels, raccoons, wild boars, dove, cayayes, pajuil, and pheasant.

== Agricultural products ==
Wheat, cotton, corn, beans, avocado, chayote, beet, radish, squash, carrot, broccoli, cabbage, coffee, and guaque Chile peppers are grown.

== Crafts ==
The municipality is rich in the craftsmanship of leather goods such as knife and machete sheaths, sandals, articles of jade, tables and chairs, ropemaking, and other items.

== Celebrations ==
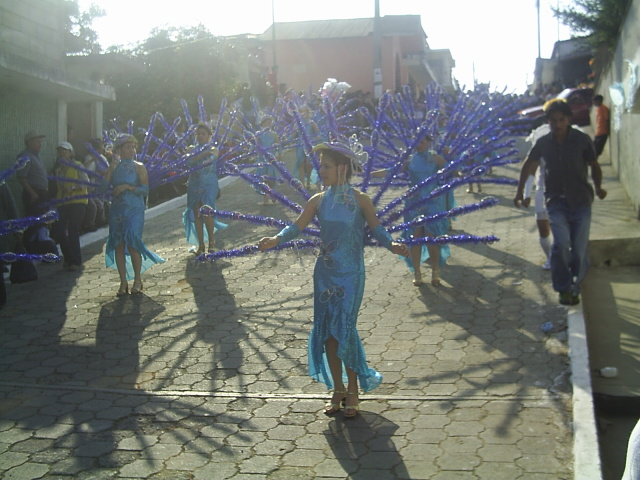
Dancing on Convite, 2005

- Convite (the last Saturday of January)
- Feria Titular (from 22 November to 1 December)
- Corpus Christi (late June)
- Corrida de Cintas (15 September)
- Maximón (28 October)
- Saint Andrew the Apostle (30 November)

== Places of interest ==
- Xipacay bath
- Temple of San Simón

== Volunteer Organizations ==
- DOCARE Clinic - An American non-profit medical outreach program operated by the American Osteopathic Association. This clinic was established in 2011 in conjunction with Guatemalan non-profit ASSADE, employs a full-time physician and nurse, and regularly hosts medical students and physician trainees from American programs as volunteer medical providers.
- Maya Pedal - small local NGO dedicated to supporting rural development through the design and production of pedal-powered machines, or bicimaquinas. As of September 2012, Maya Pedal recently underwent an organizational change; please refer to the website or Facebook page for more information.
- Project Genesis - Local nonprofit that provides education and community development programs to the children of San Andrés and the surrounding villages. It aims to build a school and begin employing full-time teachers. The project currently relies on international volunteers and was founded by Ricardo Armas, who lives in Jocotenango.

== Climate ==
San Andrés Itzapa has a subtropical highland climate (Köppen: Cwb).

Climate data for San Andrés Itzapa
| Month | Jan | Feb | Mar | Apr | May | Jun | Jul | Aug | Sep | Oct | Nov | Dec | Year |
|---|---|---|---|---|---|---|---|---|---|---|---|---|---|
| Mean daily maximum °C (°F) | 21.7 (71.1) | 22.6 (72.7) | 24.2 (75.6) | 24.7 (76.5) | 24.4 (75.9) | 22.5 (72.5) | 22.7 (72.9) | 23.1 (73.6) | 22.5 (72.5) | 21.8 (71.2) | 21.9 (71.4) | 21.6 (70.9) | 22.8 (73.1) |
| Daily mean °C (°F) | 15.5 (59.9) | 16.1 (61.0) | 17.4 (63.3) | 18.6 (65.5) | 18.9 (66.0) | 18.1 (64.6) | 17.9 (64.2) | 17.9 (64.2) | 17.8 (64.0) | 17.1 (62.8) | 16.4 (61.5) | 15.5 (59.9) | 17.3 (63.1) |
| Mean daily minimum °C (°F) | 9.3 (48.7) | 9.6 (49.3) | 10.6 (51.1) | 12.5 (54.5) | 13.4 (56.1) | 13.8 (56.8) | 13.2 (55.8) | 12.8 (55.0) | 13.1 (55.6) | 12.4 (54.3) | 11.0 (51.8) | 9.5 (49.1) | 11.8 (53.2) |
| Average precipitation mm (inches) | 3 (0.1) | 4 (0.2) | 4 (0.2) | 37 (1.5) | 113 (4.4) | 277 (10.9) | 199 (7.8) | 187 (7.4) | 263 (10.4) | 139 (5.5) | 36 (1.4) | 8 (0.3) | 1,270 (50.1) |
Source: Climate-Data.org

== Geographic location ==
San Andrés Itzapa is surrounded by Chimaltenango Department municipalities:

== See also ==
- List of places in Guatemala
