= Zaragoza, Chimaltenango =

Zaragoza
- Municipality and town

- Location in Guatemala Location in Chimaltenango Department
- Coordinates: 14°39′N 90°53′W
- Country: Guatemala
- Department: Chimaltenango

Government
  - Mayor: Juan Francisco Cardenas Argueta

Area
  - Total: 19.0 sq mi (49.1 km^{2})

Population (2018 census)
  - Total: 24,022
  - Density: 1,270/sq mi (489/km^{2})
- Time zone: UTC+6 (Central Time)
- Climate: Cwb

Zaragoza (Spanish pronunciation: [saɾaˈɣosa]) is a town, with a population of 11,176 (2018 census), and a municipality in the Chimaltenango department of Guatemala.

== History ==
One of the earliest references to the town during the Spanish Colony can be found in Compendio de la Historia de la Ciudad de Guatemala (English:Brief account of Guatemala City history) who in 1818 wrote Domingo Juarros. He said that the Spanish villa belong to Patzicía's "curato" in the mayor municipality of Chimaltenango.

After the independence of Central America in 1821, the Constitution of the State of Guatemala from 11 October 1825, specified the town in the territory, and the villa appeared in Circuit #8 (Sacatepéquez), within Chimaltenango and then, by the Constitutional Assembly of 1839, the town was assigned to Chimaltenango Department. Finally, by an executive action of 27 January 1892, the town was elevated to municipality, and its name was changed to "Zaragoza" because most of the Spanish people who lived there was from Zaragoza, Spain.

In 1895 British archeologist Alfred Percival Maudslay and his wife, Anne Cary Maudslay, visited Zaragoza on their way from Antigua Guatemala to Santiago Atitlán. Anne Maudslay told her adventure in the book A glimpse at Guatemala, from the Victorian Era perspective: "After riding a mile or two along a road bordered by cottages bosomed in fruit trees we rose to a bleak tableland. It was one of the very few days of unpleasant weather which we experience during the whole of our journey; a fierce wind raised clouds of dust and rustled through the ugly dry rastrojos, or stubbles of Indian corn, which covered the plain. We passed through the little Indian town of Zaragoza, chiefly noted for the manufacture of aparejos, the native pack-saddles. I have been told that the Indians here have such a liking for dried alligator meat as a Lenten fare that the vendors of the highly-perfumed delicacy have to be locked up in the carcel (English: Jail for protection and sell the meat through the prison bars. The streets were full of gaily-dressed people assembled for a fiesta, and dancing was going on in a shed, to a monotonous sound of a marimba. We were not tempted to loiter for long, and rode on again over the dull plan to uninteresting town of Chimaltenango."

== Administrative division ==
Zaragoza administrative division
Classification	List
Villages	Las Lomas, Puerta Abajo, Agua Dulce, Mancheren, Las Colmenas, El Cuntic, Rincón Grande, Joya Grande, Potrerillos, Rincón Chiquito, Tululché and El Llano
Settlements	Hierba Buena, Laguna Seca and El Perique
Residential neighborhoods	El Pilar, Las Ilusiones, Lo de Pérez, Nueva Esperanza and La Colonia 29 de Diciembre
Hacienda	Los Jutes

== Tourism and recreation ==
The following is the list of the main celebrations in the municipality:

Traditional celebrations
Month	Day	Description
January	1	New Year: Masquerade dance and free public concert
January	15	Peregrination to visit Esquipulas. Rincón Chiquito and Joya Grande villages celebrate their annual fair in honor to Esquipulas Black Christ.
February	2	"Virgen de Candelaria" prayers and Mass
February	Variable	Canival
March and April	Variable	Lent: processions with "Jesús del Pensamiento" (English:Jeus of the Thought), Vía crucis every Friday, and culinary dishes.
May	3	Day of the Cross: construction workers build and ornament a cross on every single construction site in town. The town itself celebrates the Cruz de Pachojo (English:Pachojo's Cross).
May	10	Mother's day
June	17	Father's day
September	1	Opening ceremony of Independence celebrations
September	4 to 8	Several contests take place.
September	13 and 14	Torch races and civic ceremonies
September	15	Independence Day: Civic parade
September	30	Closing ceremony of Independence celebrations
October	1	Horse parade and cowboy night
October	7 (Note: Or the last Saturday of September or first of October.)	Zaragoza's queen crowning
October	8 (Note: Or the second Sunday of October.)	Fair parade
October	11	"Virgen del Pilar" (English: Virgin of the Pillar) procession
October	12	Major Mass
October	13	Public free celebration and Belt race. A second procession comes out at night.
October	14	Closing ball, called "El Baile de Antaño" (English: "The Forgone era Ball")
November	1	Day of the dead: Celebrated with visits to the local cemetery, custom kite flying and traditional food.
December	24	Christmas Eve
December	25	Christmas: Masquerade dance and free public concert
December	29	Annual fair

== Climate ==
Zaragoza has a subtropical highland climate (Köppen: Cwb).

Climate data for Zaragoza
Month	Jan	Feb	Mar	Apr	May	Jun	Jul	Aug	Sep	Oct	Nov	Dec	Year
Mean daily maximum °C (°F)	20.0 (68.0)	21.0 (69.8)	22.4 (72.3)	23.3 (73.9)	22.6 (72.7)	20.8 (69.4)	21.1 (70.0)	21.6 (70.9)	20.8 (69.4)	20.4 (68.7)	20.1 (68.2)	20.1 (68.2)	21.2 (70.1)
Daily mean °C (°F)	14.2 (57.6)	14.8 (58.6)	16.1 (61.0)	17.5 (63.5)	17.7 (63.9)	16.8 (62.2)	16.8 (62.2)	16.8 (62.2)	16.5 (61.7)	16.0 (60.8)	15.0 (59.0)	14.5 (58.1)	16.1 (60.9)
Mean daily minimum °C (°F)	8.5 (47.3)	8.7 (47.7)	9.9 (49.8)	11.7 (53.1)	12.8 (55.0)	12.9 (55.2)	12.5 (54.5)	12.1 (53.8)	12.2 (54.0)	11.7 (53.1)	10.0 (50.0)	8.9 (48.0)	11.0 (51.8)
Average precipitation mm (inches)	4 (0.2)	6 (0.2)	7 (0.3)	37 (1.5)	121 (4.8)	303 (11.9)	226 (8.9)	224 (8.8)	287 (11.3)	154 (6.1)	45 (1.8)	10 (0.4)	1,424 (56.2)
Source: Climate-Data.org

Winds speed average is 13,5 km/h between January and June, and of 25 km/h between July and December, while the daily sun light average is 6,6 h.

== Geographic location ==
Located in the middle of Chimaltenango Department with an area of 49.1 km^{2}. It is completely surrounded by Chimaltenango municipalities:

== Sister cities ==
- Zaragoza, Spain

== Notes and references ==
=== Bibliography ===
- Juarros, Domingo (1818). Compendio de la historia de la Ciudad de Guatemala (in Spanish). Guatemala: Ignacio Beteta. "Br. Juarros was a secular priest and Guatemala's Archdiocese sinodal examiner"
- Maudslay, Alfred Percival; Maudslay, Anne Cary (1899). A glimpse at Guatemala, and some notes on the ancient monuments of Central America (PDF). London, UK: John Murray.
