= Santa Catarina Barahona =

Coordinates: 14°33′N 90°47′W

Santa Catarina Barahona (Spanish pronunciation: [ˈsanta kataˈɾina βaɾaˈona]) is a municipality in the Guatemalan department of Sacatepéquez.
