= Chimaltenango Department =

Department of Guatemala

Coordinates: 14.563316°N 90.982067°W

Chimaltenango Department Departmento de Chimaltenango
- Department of Guatemala
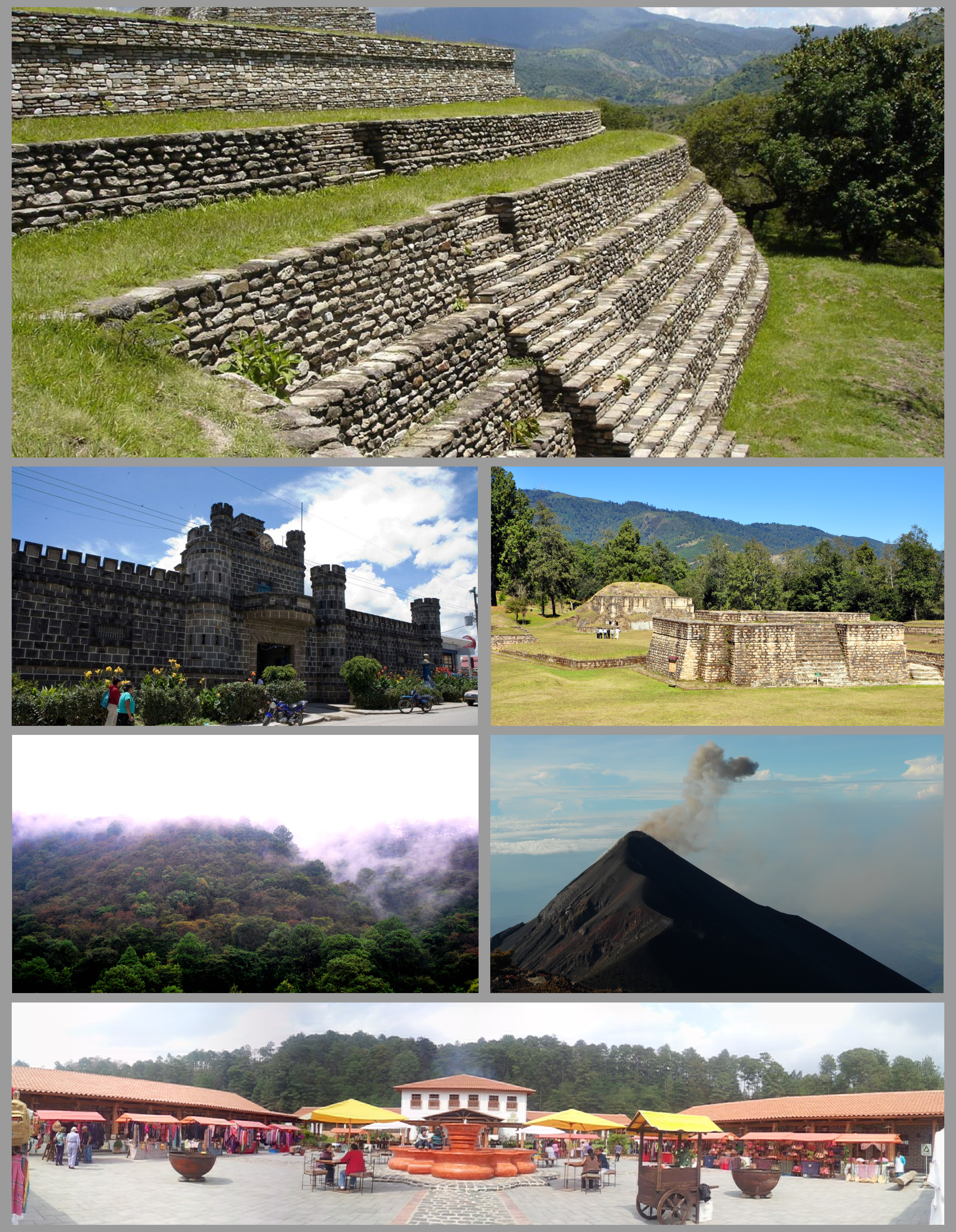
- Counterclockwise from top: English: Mixco Viejo Ruins in San Martín Jilotepeque, Castle in Chimaltenango, Iximche Ruins in Tecpan, Madrean pine–oak woodlands in Chimaltenango, Acatenango volcano in Acatenango, Hacienda Real in Tecpan

- Flag Coat of arms

- Chimaltenango
- Country: Guatemala
- Municipalities: 16
- Capital: Chimaltenango

Government
  - Type: Departmental

Area
  - Department of Guatemala: 1,979 km^{2} (764 sq mi)

Population (2018)
  - Department of Guatemala: 615,776
  - Density: 311.2/km^{2} (805.9/sq mi)
  - Urban: 333,300
  - Religions: Roman Catholicism Evangelicalism Maya
- Time zone: UTC-6

Chimaltenango is a department of Guatemala. The capital is Chimaltenango.

== Geography ==
Located to the east are Guatemala Department, home to Guatemala City, and Sacatepéquez Department, while also bordered by Quiché Department and Baja Verapaz Department to the north, Escuintla Department and Suchitepéquez Department to the south, and Sololá Department to the west. The capital of Chimaltenango is located about 54 kilometers away from Guatemala City.

In addition to the city of Chimaltenango, the department contains the towns of Santa Apolonia (known for its ceramics), San Juan Comalapa, and Patzún (known for its elaborate Corpus Christi celebrations in June). Chimaltenango is also home to the Maya civilization ruins of Iximché and Mixco Viejo, in addition to many smaller sites.

== Demographics ==
As of the 2018 census, the population of Chimaltenango department was 615,776. The majority of the people in the department are of Cakchiquel Maya descent. The department has an area of 1,979 km^{2} (764 sq mi).

There are several humanitarian aid groups that provide services in Chimaltenango.

== Municipalities ==
1. Acatenango
2. Chimaltenango
3. El Tejar
4. Parramos
5. Patzicía
6. Patzún
7. Pochuta
8. San Andrés Itzapa
9. San José Poaquil
10. San Juan Comalapa
11. San Martín Jilotepeque
12. Santa Apolonia
13. Santa Cruz Balanyá
14. Tecpán Guatemala
15. Yepocapa
16. Zaragoza

The department abbreviation is CMT.
