= Tecpán, Guatemala =

Tecpán
- Municipality and town
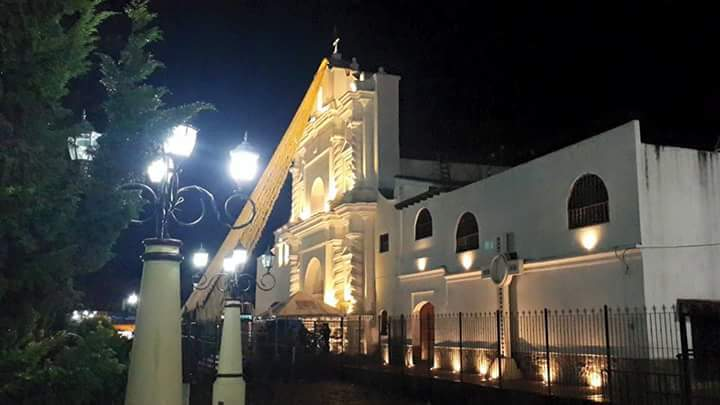
- Tecpán at night

- Location within Guatemala
- Coordinates: 14°46′N 91°0′W
- Country: Guatemala
- Department: Chimaltenango
- Established: 1525

Area
  - Total: 102 sq mi (264 km^{2})

Population (2018 census)
  - Total: 34,519
  - Density: 339/sq mi (131/km^{2})
  - Municipality: 91,927
- Time zone: UTC-6 (Central Time)
- Climate: Cwb
- Website: www.munitecpanguatemala.gob.gt

Tecpán is a town, with a population of 34,519 (2018 census), and a municipality in the department of Chimaltenango, in Guatemala, on the Inter-American Highway CA-1.

The climate is generally cool. It is characterized as a tourist destination, with some fame derived from its landscapes, varied vegetation and from being on an access route to Iximché archaeological site.

== History ==
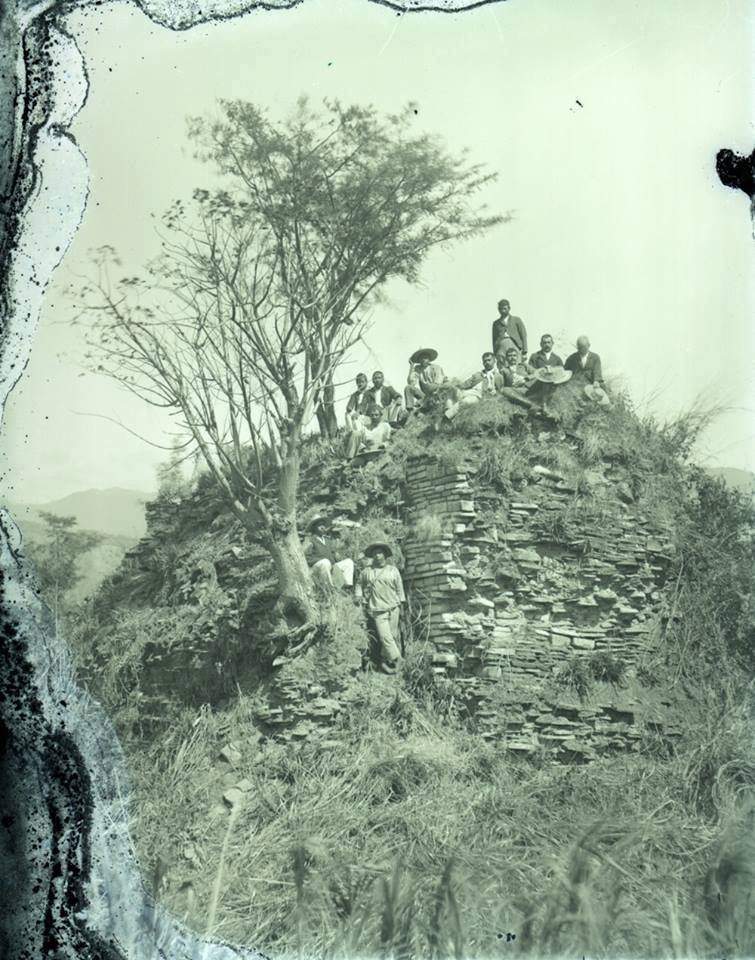
Ruins of Iximché, the former Kaqchikel Maya capital city, in the 1920s.

Tecpán is known as the 'first capital of Guatemala,' based on it being the first permanent Spanish colonial military center of the nation, established in 1525. The first government capital settlement in colonial Guatemala, and its 'second capital', was Ciudad Vieja, established in 1527.

The fort was built here due to the difficulty that the Spanish had in defeating the Kaqchikel Maya during the Spanish conquest of Guatemala.

The remains of the Kaqchikel capital city, Iximché, are on a high hill a few kilometers from the city.

== Demographics ==
Tecpán currently is one of the larger municipalities in the nation, due to its far geographical reach to the northeast corner of its department, Chimaltenango. Its population is over 90% indigenous, mostly descendants of the Kaqchikel Maya.

== Climate ==
Tecpán has a subtropical highland climate (Köppen: Cwb).

Climate data for Tecpán
Month	Jan	Feb	Mar	Apr	May	Jun	Jul	Aug	Sep	Oct	Nov	Dec	Year
Mean daily maximum °C (°F)	19.1 (66.4)	20.1 (68.2)	21.5 (70.7)	22.4 (72.3)	21.9 (71.4)	20.3 (68.5)	20.4 (68.7)	21.0 (69.8)	20.0 (68.0)	19.6 (67.3)	19.3 (66.7)	19.2 (66.6)	20.4 (68.7)
Daily mean °C (°F)	13.0 (55.4)	13.6 (56.5)	14.9 (58.8)	16.2 (61.2)	16.9 (62.4)	16.1 (61.0)	16.0 (60.8)	16.0 (60.8)	15.5 (59.9)	15.1 (59.2)	13.8 (56.8)	13.4 (56.1)	15.0 (59.1)
Mean daily minimum °C (°F)	7.0 (44.6)	7.2 (45.0)	8.4 (47.1)	10.1 (50.2)	11.9 (53.4)	12.0 (53.6)	11.6 (52.9)	11.0 (51.8)	11.1 (52.0)	10.7 (51.3)	8.4 (47.1)	7.6 (45.7)	9.8 (49.6)
Average precipitation mm (inches)	2 (0.1)	4 (0.2)	6 (0.2)	47 (1.9)	112 (4.4)	273 (10.7)	184 (7.2)	211 (8.3)	282 (11.1)	137 (5.4)	32 (1.3)	5 (0.2)	1,295 (51)
Source: Climate-Data.org
