= Kaqchikel people =

Indigenous Maya people of Guatemala

Kaqchikel
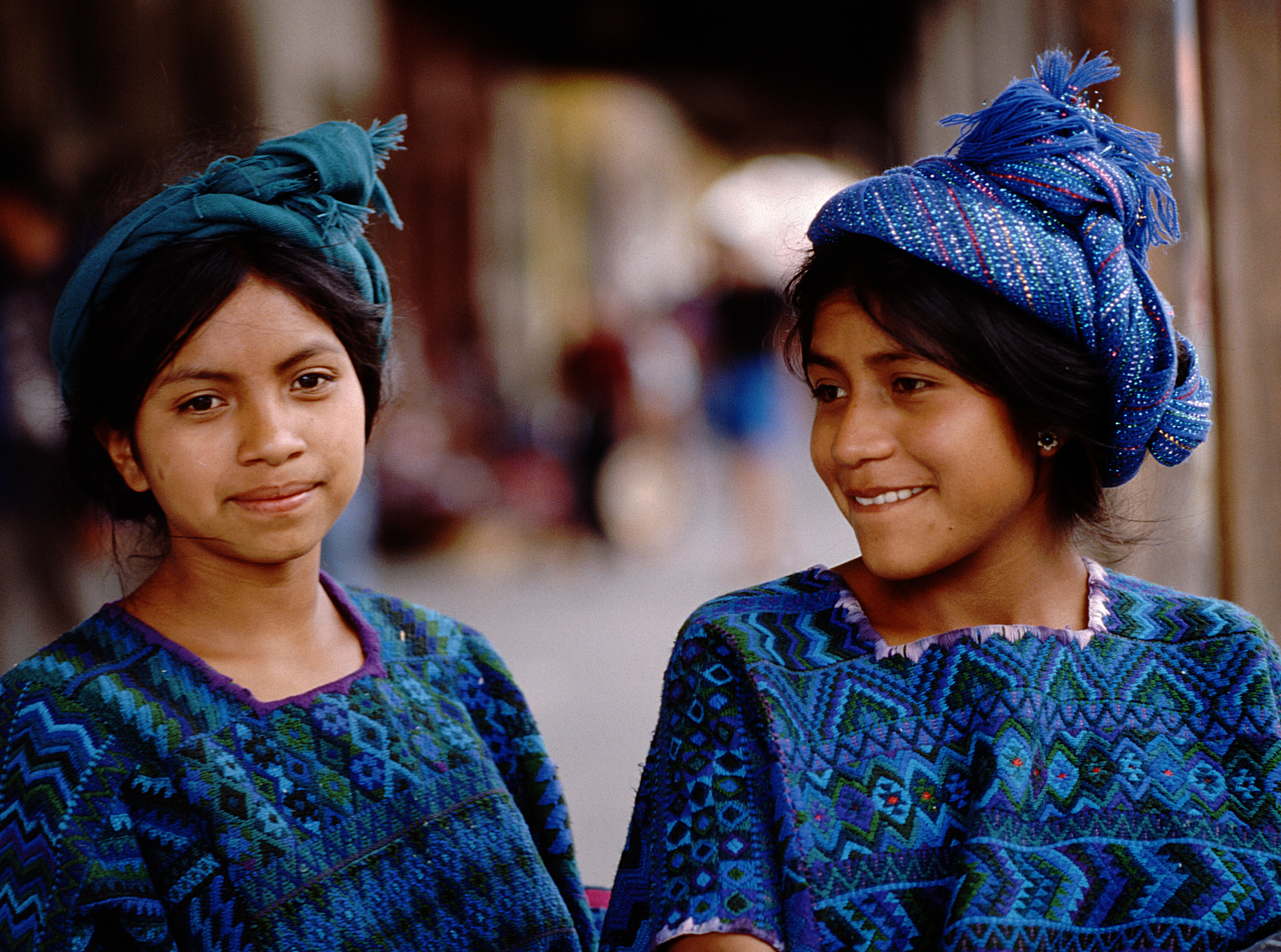
- Girls in Chichicastenango, El Quiché. The town is close to the border with Sololá which they are from.

Total population
- 1,068,356

Regions with significant populations
- Guatemala (Chimaltenango, Sololá, Sacatepéquez, and Guatemala departments); Mexico (Chiapas, Campeche)

Languages
- Kaqchikel, Spanish

Religion
- Catholic, Evangelical, Maya religion

Related ethnic groups
- K'iche', Tzutujil

The Kaqchikel (also called Kachiquel) are one of the indigenous Maya peoples of the midwestern highlands of Guatemala and of southern Mexico. They constitute Guatemala's third largest Maya group. The name was formerly spelled in various other ways, including Cakchiquel, Kakchiquel, Caqchikel, and Cachiquel.

== Overview ==
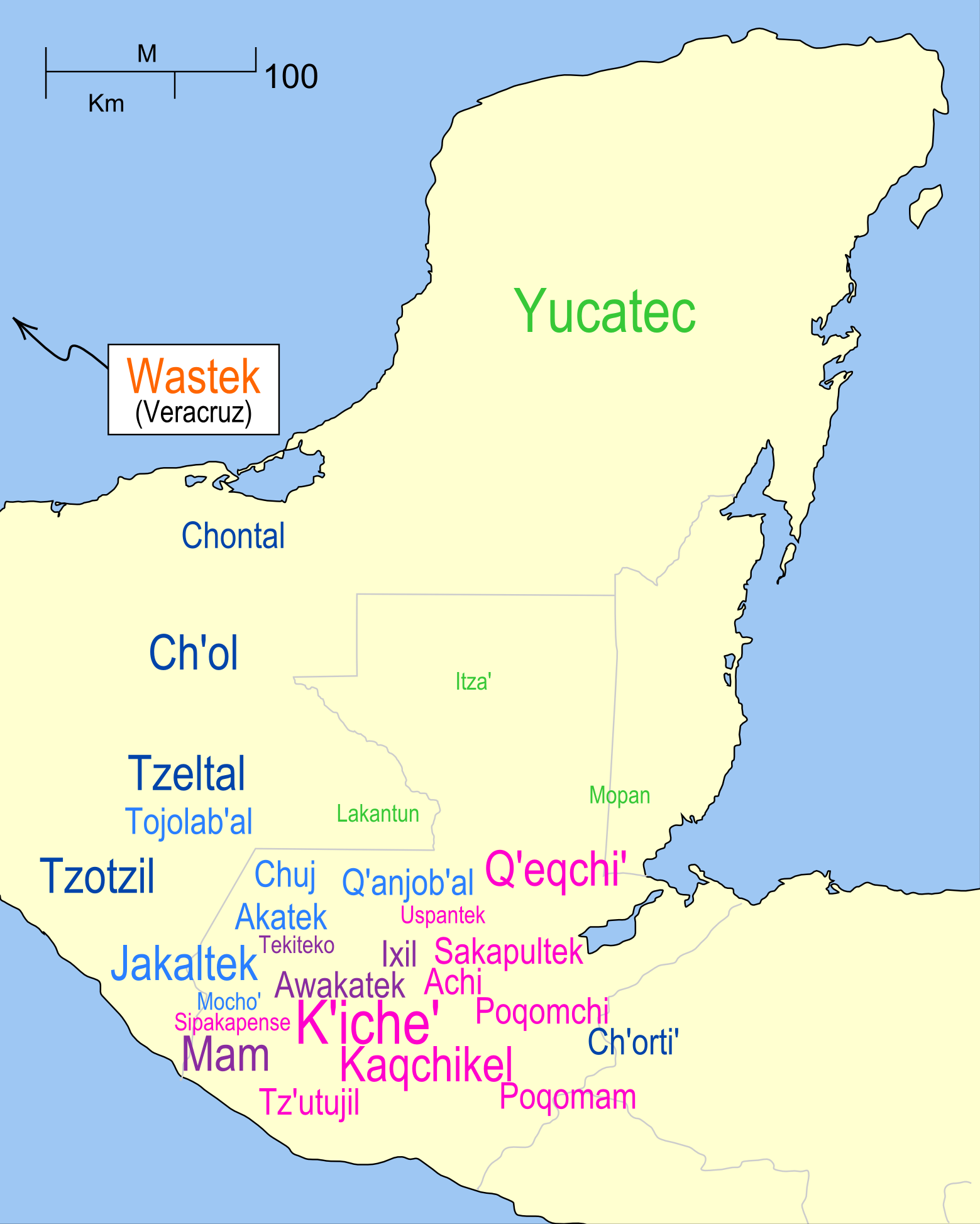
Map of the Kaqchikel speaking area.

The Kaqchikel are an indigenous Mayan group native to the central highlands of Guatemala and of southern Mexico. Today, they mainly reside in the southern part of Guatemala, especially in the department of Chimaltenango. They are located roughly around the heart of the country, Guatemala City, although they do not constitute a majority of the population. The Kaqchikel make up approximately one sixth of Guatemala's Maya population. The native language of the group is Kaqchikel, spoken by around 450,000 people in Guatemala (one half of the ethnic Kaqchikel population).

== Language ==
The Kaqchikel language, one of the Mayan languages from the Quichean branch, is spoken today by 400,000 people. It is closely related to the Tzutujil language.

== Location ==
In Guatemala they live in the departments of Sololá, Chimaltenango, Sacatepéquez, Guatemala, Baja Verapaz Department, and Escuintla.

In Mexico, the Kaqchikel communities are located in the state of Chiapas, in the municipalities of Amatenango de la Frontera, Mazapa de Madero, Motozintla, Frontera Comalapa, El Porvenir and Villa Comatitlan, due to recent migrations, there are small Kaqchikel communities in the state of Campeche located in the municipalities of Campeche and Champotón.

== History ==
In Postclassic Maya times the capital of the main branch of the Kaqchikel was Iximché. Like the neighboring K'iche' (Quiché), they were governed by four lords: Tzotzil, Xahil, Tucuché and Acajal, who were responsible for the administrative, military and religious affairs. The Kakchikel recorded their history in the book Annals of the Cakchiquels, also known as Memorial de Sololá. While the other subgroups were united under Iximche, the Acajal (also known as Chajoma) retained their political autonomy; the ruins of Mixco Viejo have been identified as their capital.

Iximché was conquered by the Spanish conquistador Pedro de Alvarado in 1524. At that time, the Kaqchikel were the enemies of the neighbouring K'iche' Kingdom, and helped the Spaniards to conquer it. The first colonial capital of Guatemala, Tecpán Guatemala, was founded near Iximché on July 25, 1524. On November 22, 1527, after several Kaqchikel uprisings, the capital was moved to Ciudad Vieja, near Antigua Guatemala.

=== Dawns ===
Dawns (saqarik/saqer) refer to distinct stages or transitions of Kaqchikel political development. In Kaqchikel tradition, each dawn represents moving from dependence on other groups, especially from the Kʼiche’. The first dawn for the Kaqchikel began when they formed an alliance with the K’iche, maintained through the marriage of Kaqchikel men and K’iche’ women. The second dawn occurred when the Kaqchikel and their allied groups relocated to present day Chichicastenango in Quiché Department, under K’iche rule. The third dawn occurred when the Kaqchikel elite were granted permission by the K’iche’ to establish their own government, where they founded their first capital, Chi Awär, around 1430 CE, while remaining under the influence of the K’iche’. The fourth dawn is marked by independence gained from the K’iche’ and the establishment of their own capital, Iximche, around 1470 CE.

== Migration ==
The Kaqchikel people immigrate between different regions of Guatemala and establish new homes in the United States due to economic opportunities and social needs. Women in migrant families protect their cultural heritage and keep their communities stable during this process. Through migration, people develop stronger cultural ties because they protect their traditional customs and language while learning to survive in new environments. The United States identifies Guatemalan Indigenous immigrants and Guatemalan Americans through "Latino" and "Hispanic" terms which do not accurately represent their Indigenous heritage. Ethnographic research has shown that some Kaqchikel migrants choose to reject Latino identity by using their Indigenous heritage to identify themselves through their language, traditional food, clothing and their cultural customs. Research on Guatemalan immigration to the United States shows that Indigenous Maya migrants preserve their ethnic heritage and maintain connections with their homeland communities during their time in the United States.

== See also ==
- Our Elders Teach Us
- Iximche
