= Eischen (surname) =

Eischen is a surname. Notable people with the surname include:

- Albert Eischen (1899–1949), Luxembourgish racing cyclist
- Clem Eischen (1926–2020), American middle-distance runner
- Ellen Eischen (born 1979), American mathematician
- Joey Eischen (born 1970), American baseball player

== See also ==
- Eischen Bar, bar and restaurant in Oklahoma City
