= Tz'utujil =

Tz'utujil (/ˈsuːtəhiːl, ˈtsuː-/), Tzutujil, Tzutuhil, Sutujil, and Zutuhil may refer to

- Tz'utujil people, an ethnic subgroup of the Maya
- Tz'utujil language, spoken by those people
