= Blessed Stanley Rother Shrine =

Roman Catholic church and museum in Oklahoma City

Coordinates: 35.375699°N 97.497842°W

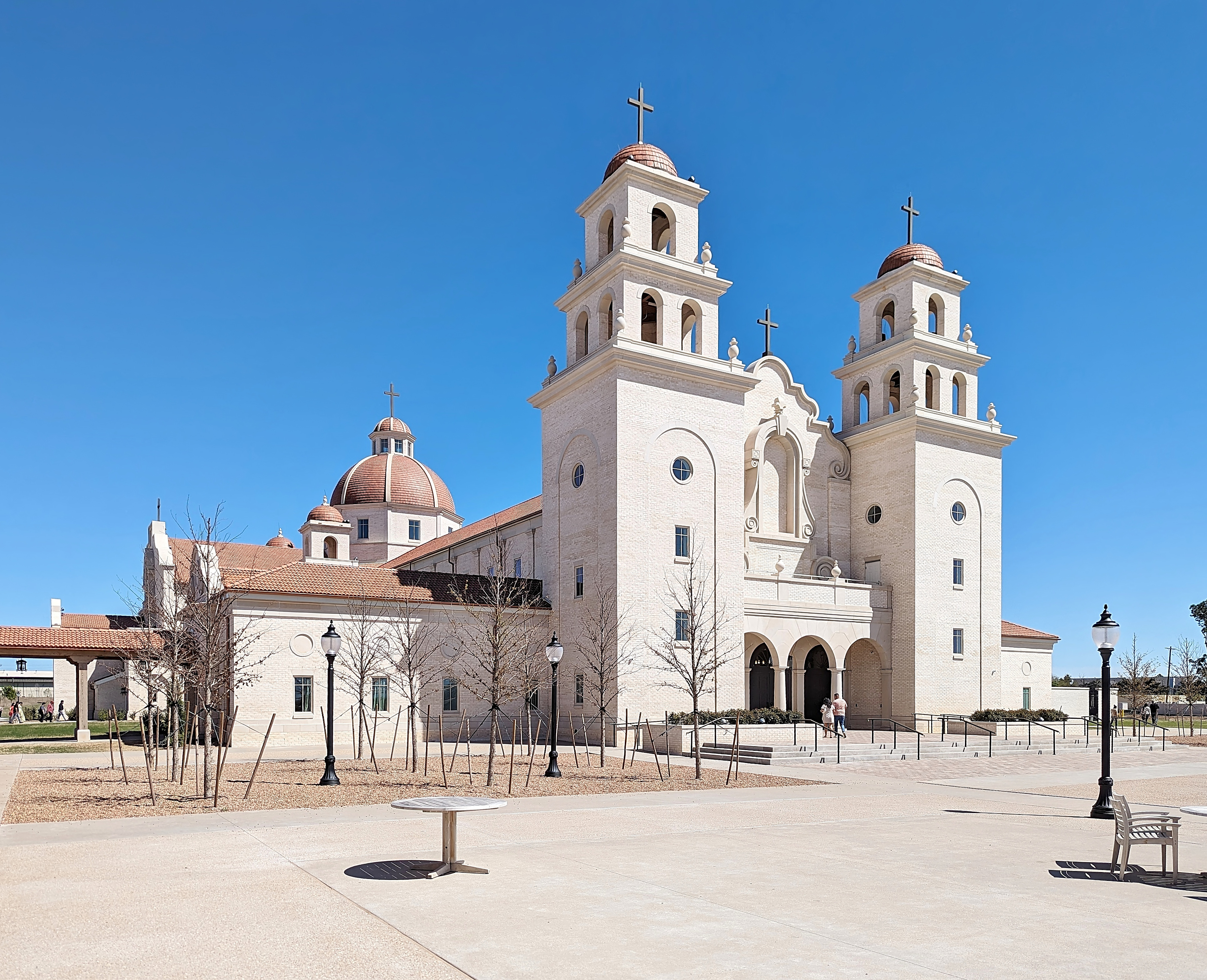
- Blessed Stanley Rother Shrine
- Location: 700 SE 89th Street; Oklahoma City, OK 73149; United States
- Denomination: Catholic Church
- Sui iuris church: Latin Church
- Website: www.rothershrine.org

History
- Dedicated: February 17, 2023

Architecture
- Architect(s): Franck & Lohsen Architects ADG
- Style: Spanish Colonial style
- Groundbreaking: November 3, 2019

Specifications
- Capacity: 2,000

Administration
- Archdiocese: Oklahoma City

Clergy
- Rector: Father Don Wolf

The Blessed Stanley Rother Shrine is a Roman Catholic shrine dedicated to Stanley Rother, Oklahoma-born priest, missionary, and martyr. The shrine, which serves as a church, a museum, and a pilgrimage site, is located along I-35 on the south side of Oklahoma City, in the United States. In its first year of operation, the shrine saw roughly 120,000 pilgrims and visitors.

== History ==
The 53-acre property on which the shrine now stands was previously a 9-hole golf course, which was purchased by the Archdiocese of Oklahoma City in 2016. After Stanley Rother was beatified (declared "Blessed") in 2017, the archdiocese began the process of designing and building a shrine in his honor on the property in southern Oklahoma City.

A groundbreaking ceremony took place on November 3, 2019, and construction truly began in April of 2020. Work was led by Tony Yanda, senior director of operations with the project's general contractor, The Boldt Co. Despite the effects of the COVID-19 pandemic on construction, completion of the project was only slightly delayed.

The dedication Mass was celebrated by Oklahoma City Archbishop Paul S. Coakley on February 17, 2023, with roughly 3,000 attendees from around the world. In the week leading up to the dedication, the shrine hosted a variety of milestone events, including the transfer of the body of Stanley Rother from Oklahoma City's Resurrection Memorial Cemetery to the altar of the shrine's chapel. Among attendees of the dedication week's events were dozens of bishops as well as members of the Rother family, including Stanley's sister, Marita Rother.

In its first year of operation, the shrine saw roughly 120,000 pilgrims and visitors.

== Offerings and campus ==
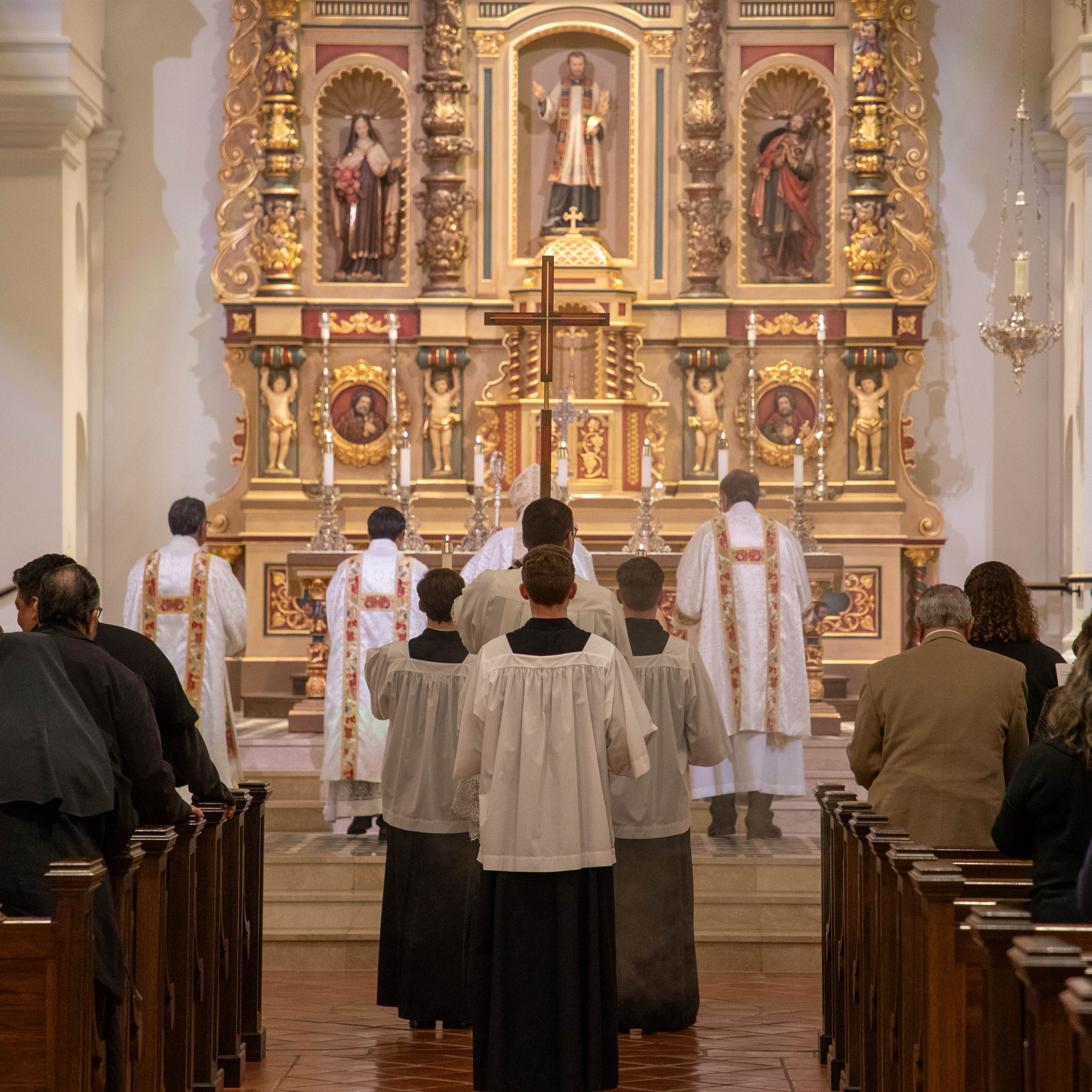
Mass at the shrine in January 2024

The shrine currently features a 35,000 sq. ft. church, which is the largest Catholic church in the state of Oklahoma. The church was built in the Spanish colonial style, inspired by the parish where Stanley Rother lived, served, and died in Santiago Atitlán, Guatemala.

On the east side of the church is a smaller chapel, where the body of Rother rests within the altar. The apse of the chapel features a mural, designed by EverGreene Studios of Brooklyn, New York. The mural depicts Rother's arrival into heaven, where he is welcomed by Jesus Christ and a collection of other martyr-saints.

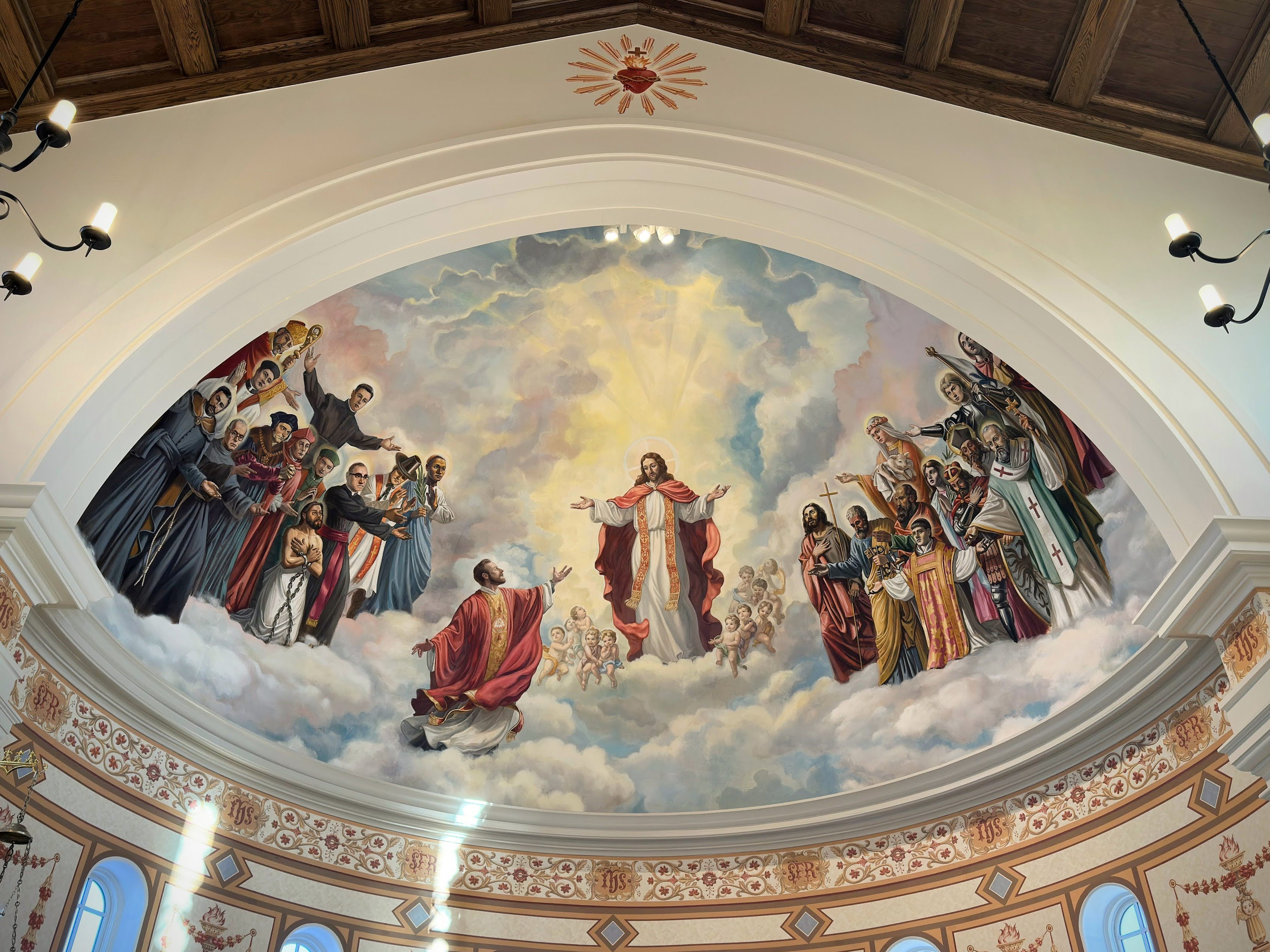
Apse mural in the Chapel of the Blessed Stanley Rother Shrine

In an adjacent building known as the Pilgrim Center, the shrine has a museum, dedicated to telling the story of Rother's life and legacy. The museum was designed by Exhibit Concepts, who also designed the Oklahoma City Bombing Memorial Museum, and includes many of Rother's belongings.

Continued construction and development is planned for the shrine, including a rectory and a two-story ministry building with classrooms and space for events.

== Stanley Rother ==
Stanley Rother was an American Roman Catholic priest from Okarche, Oklahoma, who was murdered in Guatemala in 1981, where he had served as a missionary priest since 1968. In 2016, Pope Francis confirmed that Rother had died a martyr, leading to Rother's beatification on September 23, 2017, in Oklahoma City. He is the first U.S.-born priest and martyr to be beatified by the Catholic Church, and is only the second person to be beatified on American soil.

== See also ==
- List of shrines in the United States
