= Prechtel =

Prechtel is a surname. Notable people with the surname include:

- Ashten Prechtel (born 2001), American basketball player
- Martín Prechtel, American author and educator
- Volker Prechtel (1941–1997), German actor
