= Stanley Rother =

20th-century American Catholic priest and martyr

Blessed Stanley Rother
- Rother in 1975

Martyr
- Born: Stanley Francis Rother; March 27, 1935; Okarche, Oklahoma, U.S.
- Died: July 28, 1981 (aged 46); Santiago Atitlán, Sololá, Guatemala
- Cause of death: Homicide
- Venerated in: Catholic Church
- Beatified: September 23, 2017, Cox Convention Center, Oklahoma City, United States by Cardinal Angelo Amato (on behalf of Pope Francis)
- Major shrine: Blessed Stanley Rother Shrine, Oklahoma City, Oklahoma, United States
- Feast: July 28
- Attributes: Palm branch, Tz'utujil New Testament, Colorful Tz'utujil-style Stole

Stanley Francis Rother (/ˈroʊθər/ ROH-thər; March 27, 1935 – July 28, 1981) was an American Catholic priest from Oklahoma who was murdered during the Guatemalan Civil War. He held several parish assignments as a priest of the Diocese of Oklahoma City from 1963 to 1968 before being assigned as a missionary to Guatemala.

On December 1, 2016, Pope Francis confirmed that Rother had died a martyr, murdered for his faith, and Rother was beatified on September 23, 2017, in Oklahoma City. He is the first U.S.-born priest and martyr to be beatified by the Catholic Church, and the second person to be beatified on American soil.

== Early life ==
Stanley Francis Rother was born on March 27, 1935, in Okarche, Oklahoma, one of four children of Franz Rother and Gertrude Smith. Stanley was baptized on March 29, 1935, in Okarche's Holy Trinity Church by the pastor, Zenon Steber. The couple had two other sons, Tom and Jim, and a daughter, Betty Mae, who entered a religious order as an adult.

Rother grew up on the family farm near Okarche. As a child, he attended Holy Trinity School in Okarche. After completing high school, Rother decided to enter the priesthood. He studied at St. John Seminary, later to become Assumption Seminary, in San Antonio, Texas.

At St. John's, Rother served as a sacristan, bookbinder, plumber, groundskeeper and gardener while taking classes. After almost six years, seminary staff dismissed him due to poor grades, particularly with Latin. After consulting with Bishop Victor Reed of Oklahoma City, Rother was admitted to Mount Saint Mary's Seminary in Emmitsburg, Maryland. He graduated from Mount Saint Mary's in 1963.

== Ordination ==
Reed ordained Rother to the priesthood for the Diocese of Oklahoma City on May 25, 1963. After his ordination, the diocese assigned Rother to serve as a parochial vicar in various parishes around Oklahoma: Saint William in Durant, St. Francis Xavier and Holy Family in Tulsa, and Corpus Christi in Oklahoma City.

In 1968, Rother requested that Reed assign him to Micatokla, the diocesan mission church in the city of Santiago Atitlán in Guatemala. The indigenous Tz'utujil people comprised most of the population of that city, considered one of the most impoverished regions in Central America.

== Guatemalan mission ==
=== Pastoral work ===
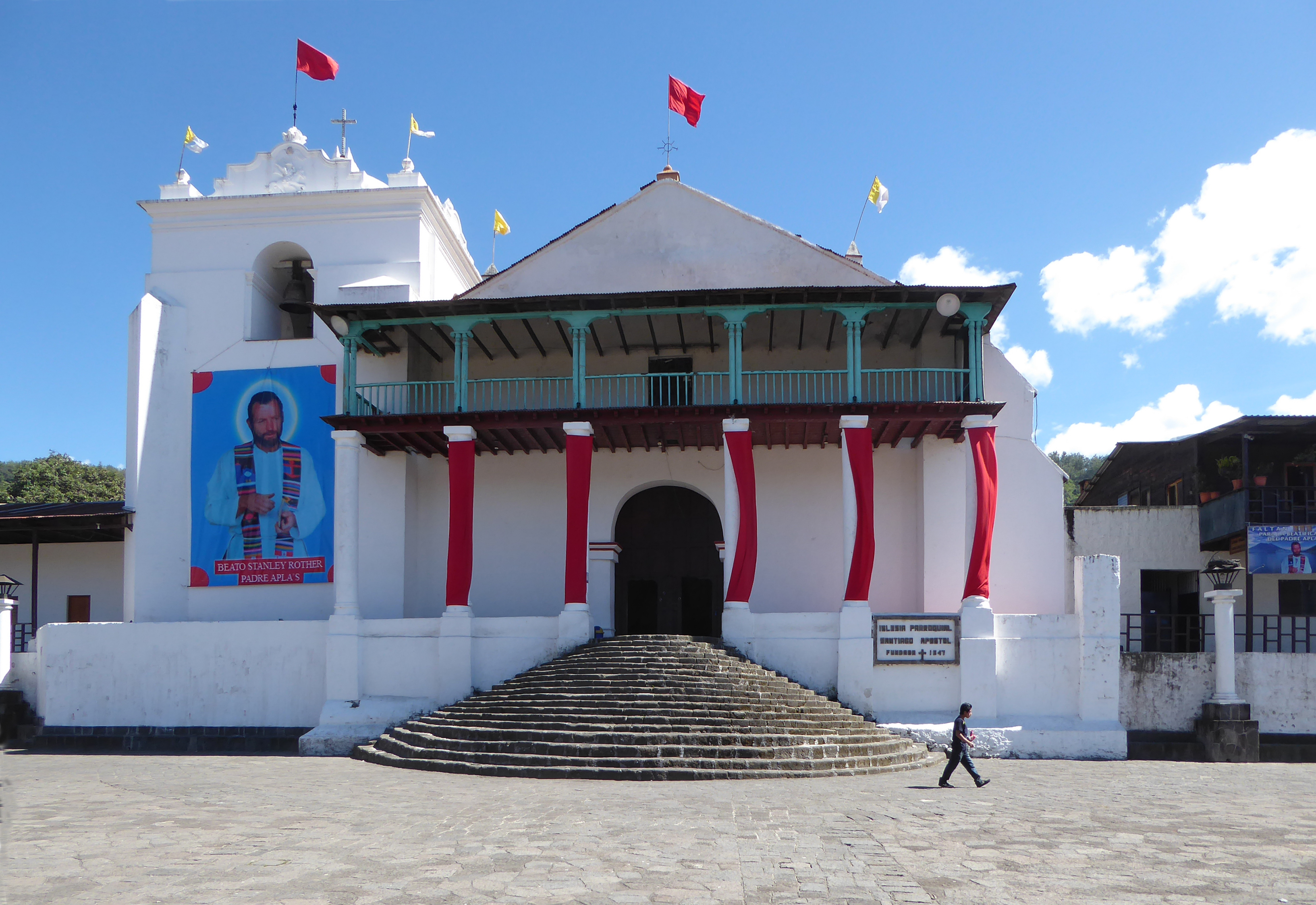
Church of Santiago Apóstol, Santiago Atitlán

Rother arrived in Santiago Atitlán in 1968. To communicate with his congregation, Rother learned Spanish and the Tz’utujil language. He shared meals with his parishioners, visited the sick and helped them obtain medical care. Rother supported a radio station located on the mission property, which transmitted daily lessons in language and mathematics. In the late 1960s, Rother co-founded a small hospital in the village of Panabaj called the "Hospitalito". Using his farming background, he helped the farmers in the area to grow new crops.

In 1973, Rother noted in a letter: "I am now preaching in Tz'utuhil." During that time, in addition to his pastoral duties, he helped translate the New Testament into Tz'utujil. By 1975, Rother had become the de facto leader of the Oklahoma-sponsored mission effort in Guatemala. He was a prominent figure in the community, owing to his light complexion and pipe smoking. As there was no Tz'utujil equivalent for the name "Stanley," the people of Rother's mission called him "Padre Apla's" ("Father Francis"), his middle name.

=== Civil war ===
Since 1960, Guatemala had endured a low-level conflict between a succession of autocratic military governments and leftist insurgent and protest groups, mainly composed of poor indigenous peoples. The intensity of the war increased in 1978 when Fernando Romeo Lucas García became president. The Carter Administration in the United States had cut off new military aid to Guatemala in 1977 because of human rights violations, but the government there was still receiving funds that had been previously appropriated.

Lucas García intensified army operations throughout the nation and sent out death squads to intimidate or murder indigenous peoples. As the Catholic Church was operating missions to help these people, its priests, deacons, religious sisters and parishioners became targets.

==== Return to Oklahoma ====
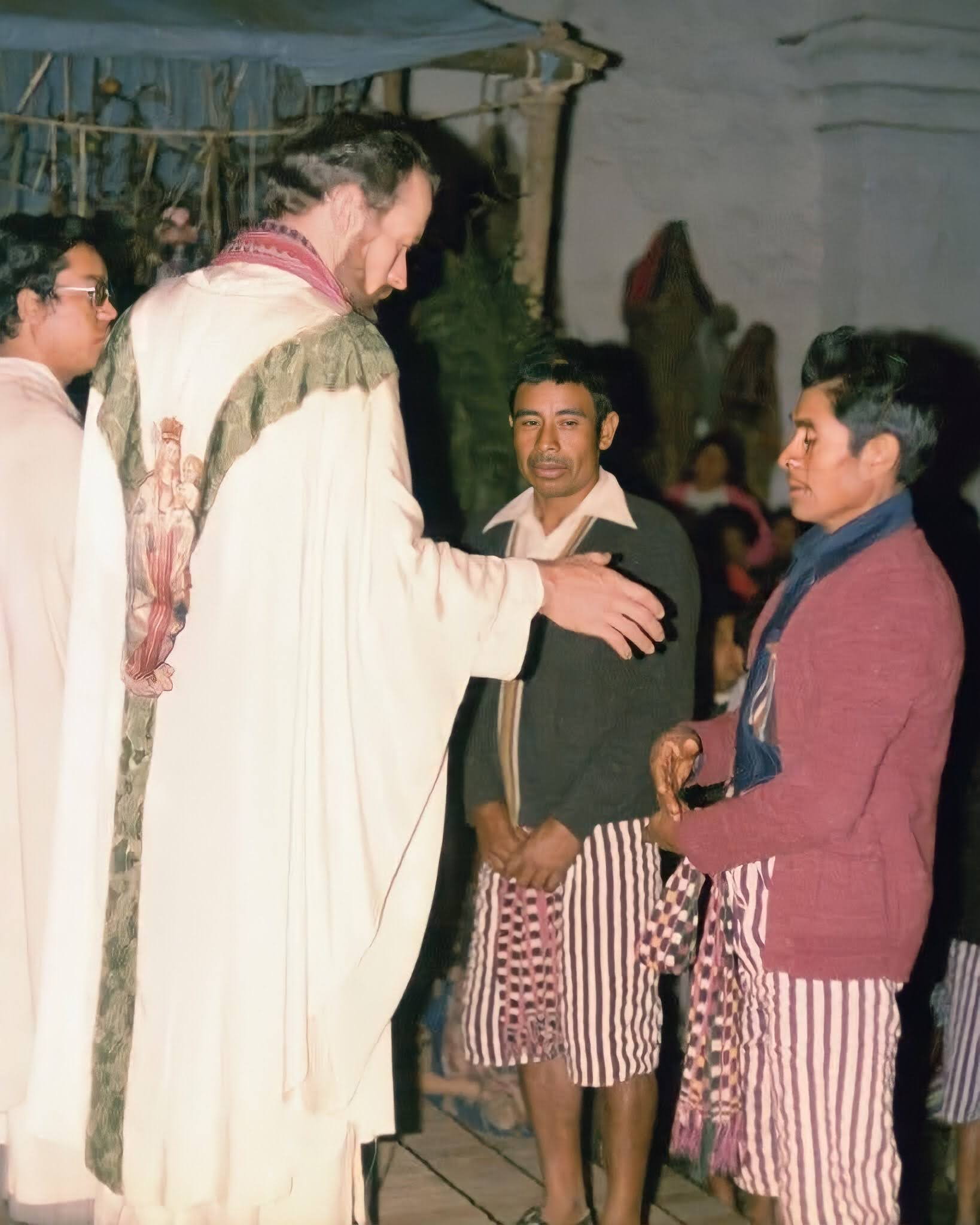
Stanley Rother (1980)

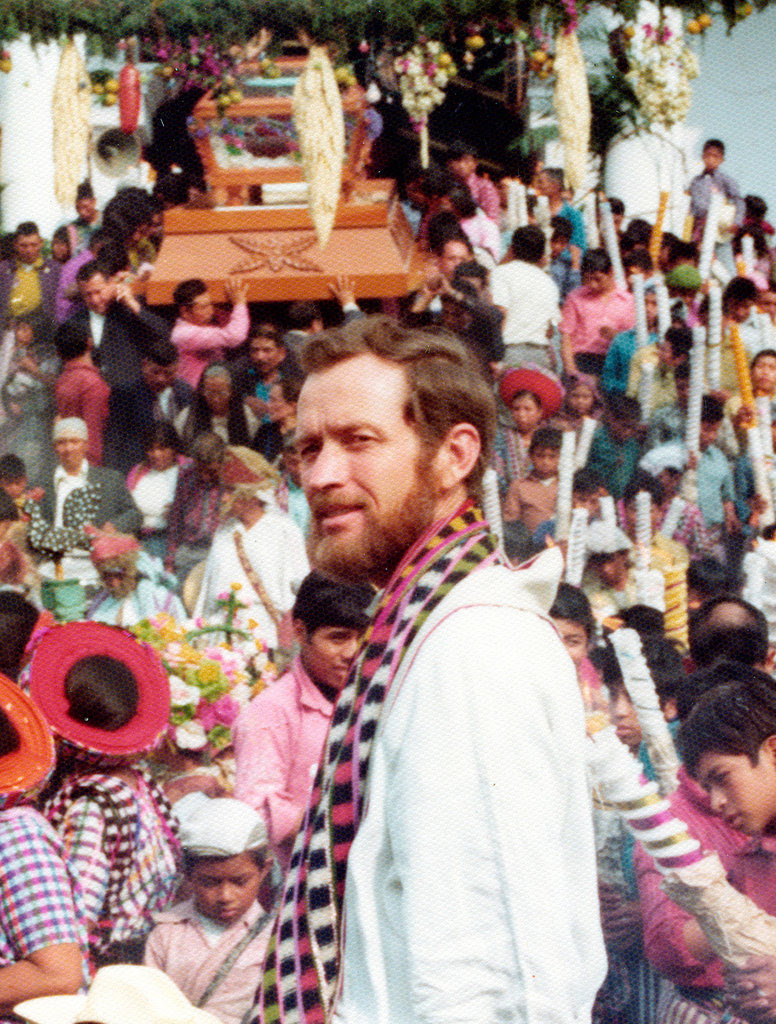
Stanley Rother (1980)

The Lucas García regime steadily increased the pressure on Micatokla. The mission radio station was destroyed and its station manager murdered. Catholic catechists and parishioners would disappear and later be found dead, their corpses bearing evidence of beating and torture. Rother realized that he was in danger. In December 1980, Rother wrote a letter to a friend in Oklahoma describing the violent situation:

"This is one of the reasons I have for staying in the face of physical harm. The shepherd cannot run at the first sign of danger."

In a January 6, 1981, letter to Oklahoma, Rother described how three men seized a catechist who had been spending nights in the church. After a struggle with the catechist, the assailants threw him in a car and drove off. Rother immediately went to the local police station to report the kidnapping, but there was no investigation. The catechist was one of 11 men from the community who disappeared, never to be seen again. Rother said in the letter that he was not ready to give up yet. He made one request of his friends in Oklahoma:

Just say a prayer on occasion that we will be safe and still able to be of service to these people of God.

In mid-January, some friends in Santiago Atitlán warned Rother that his name was on a death squad assassination list. They urged him to leave Guatemala immediately. Rother reluctantly returned to Oklahoma that month. Daniel Henry Mueggenborg, bishop of the Diocese of Reno, recalled that when he was a college student, he attended a mass that Rother celebrated in Okarche that spring. Mueggenborg said that he:

... was captivated by the deep spiritual presence that surrounded [Rother]. There was a spirit of profound peace and love [that] filled the room when he entered.

Rother wanted to go back to Micatokla. He asked Archbishop Charles Salatka of Oklahoma City for permission to return to Guatemala to celebrate Easter. Salatka agreed and Rother returned to Santiago Atitlán in April 1981.

=== Rother killing ===
On July 28, 1981, just after midnight, three masked men broke into Rother's church. They encountered Francisco Bocel, the teenage brother of one of the mission priests. According to Bocel, the gunmen threatened to kill him if he did not lead them to Rother. Bocel brought the gunmen downstairs and knocked on Rother's door. When Rother opened it, the gunmen grabbed the priest and a struggle ensued. Bocel escaped the rectory. After shooting Rother twice in the head, the gunmen fled the church.

Rother lying in state

=== Aftermath of killing ===
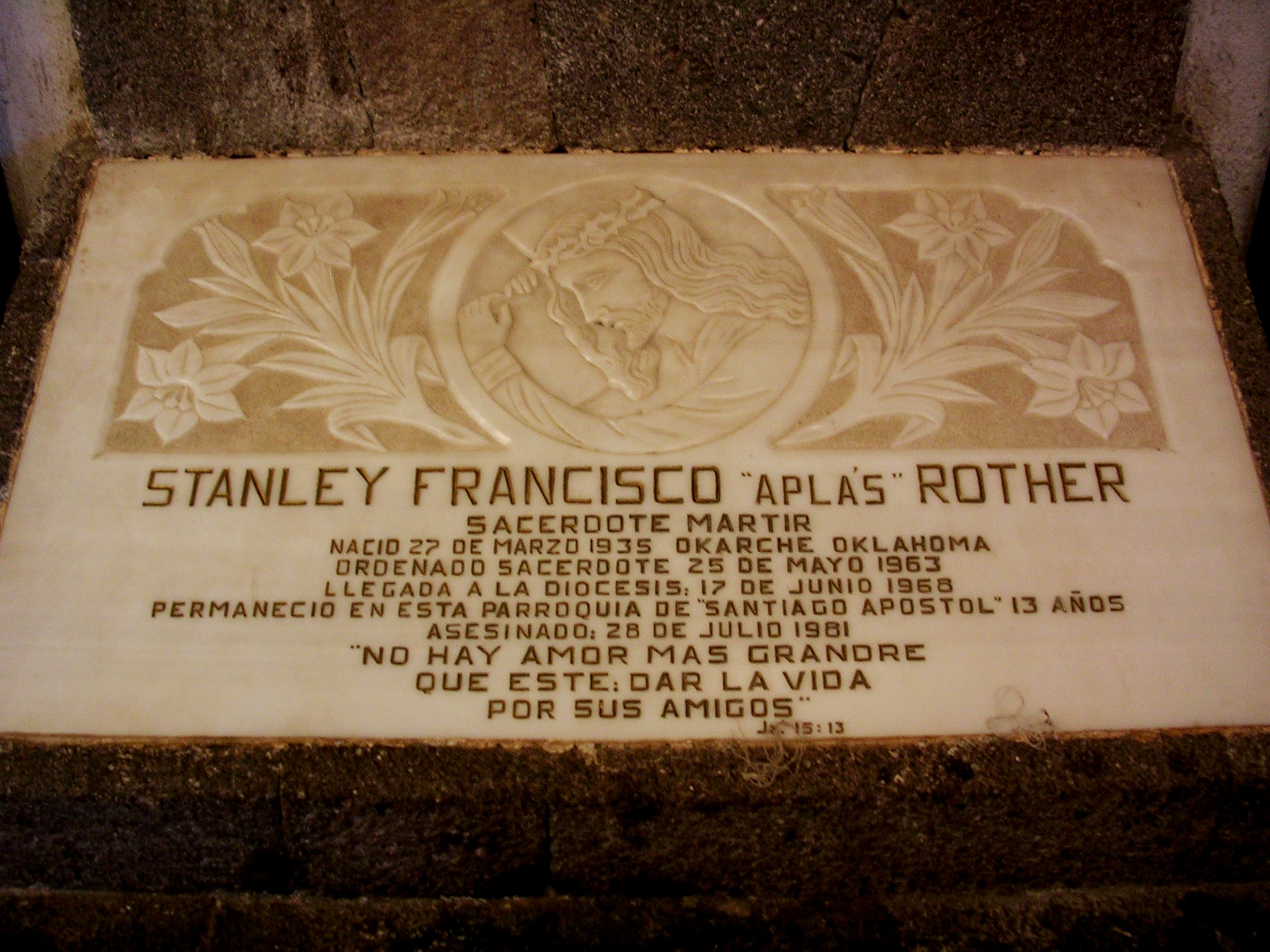
Rother memorial plaque, Santiago Atitlán

When news spread the next day in Santiago Atitlán about Rother's murder, over 1,000 people gathered in the city square to pray all day. A funeral mass was celebrated for him on July 29 at the mission church. Over 2,500 attendees crowded the building and thousands more stood outside. At the request of his parishioners, the church hierarchy allowed the removal of Rother's heart for burial behind the church altar.

On July 30, a second funeral mass was celebrated at a church in Guatemala City, the national capitol. The next day, Rother's body was flown back to Oklahoma. He was buried in Holy Trinity Cemetery in Okarche on August 3. In October 1981, Salatka celebrated a funeral mass in Oklahoma City for Rother. Speaking of Rother, Salatka said, "He went forth from his own country to share the love of Christ."

In August 1981, Guatemalan authorities arrested three men and charged them with Rother's murder. The men confessed to entering the church to commit a robbery and shooting Rother when he resisted. The men were convicted of murder and sentenced to eight years in prison, despite Bocel's claims that they were not the gunmen. Their convictions were later overturned by a Guatemalan appellate court. Some sources state that the US government pressured the Guatemalan government to overturn the verdict, but there is no proof of that. Rother was one of ten priests murdered in Guatemala in 1981.

Oklahoma Senator David Boren and Salatka called for the Reagan administration to investigate the Rother murder, but it never happened.

== Veneration ==
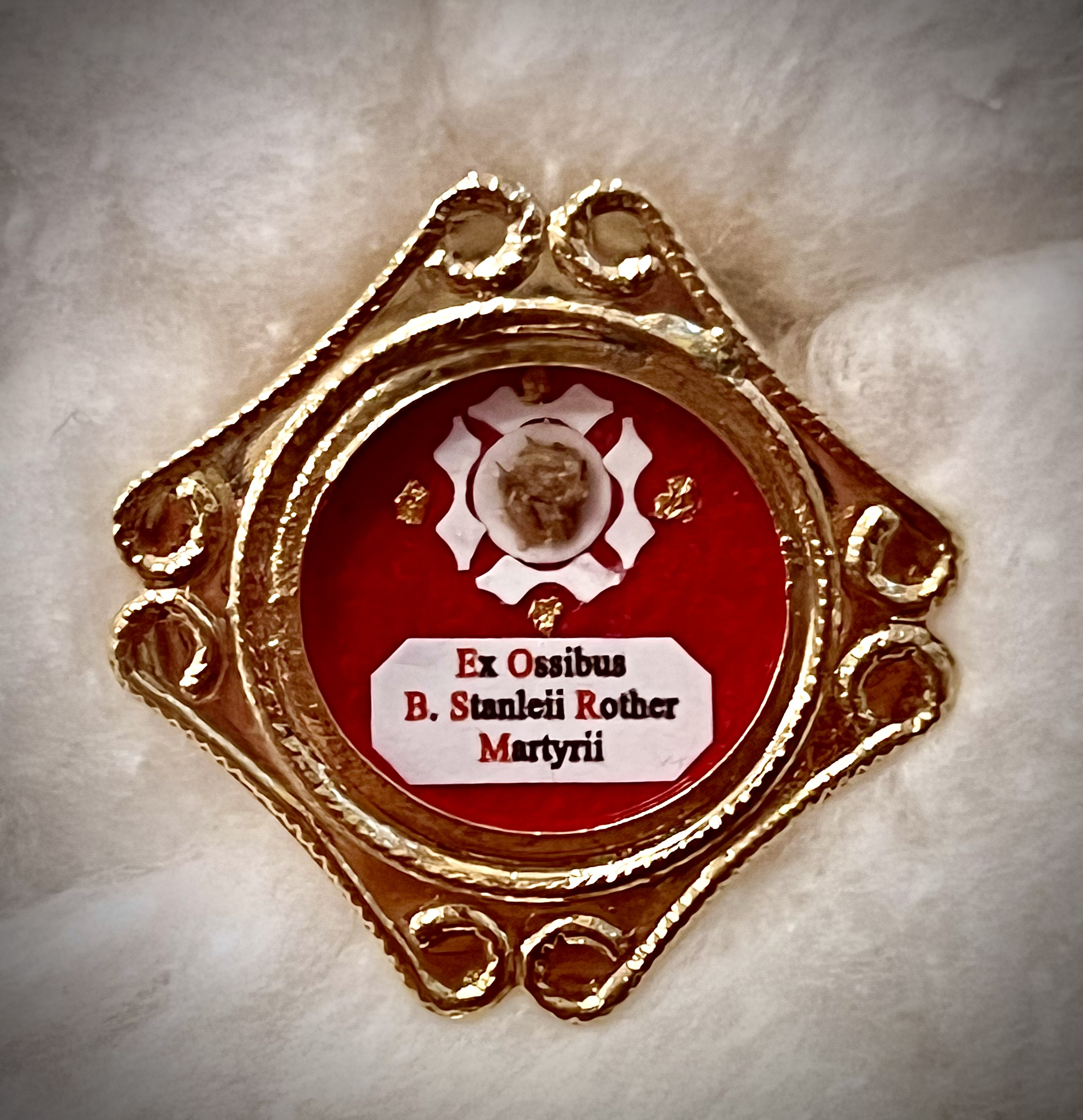
First-class bone relic of Rother

The Diocese of Sololá-Chimaltenango in Guatemala opened a cause for canonization of Rother in September 2007. They immediately transferred it to the Archdiocese of Oklahoma City, which started its investigation in October 2007. In November 2009, Rother was named a "Servant of God". The archdiocese closed its investigation in 2010 and handed it over to the Congregation for the Causes of Saints (CCS) in Rome.

The CCS validated the diocesan process in 2012, and received the Positio dossier from cause officials in 2014. The Vatican theologians unanimously approved Rother's cause in 2015. The CSS cardinal and bishops approved it in October 2016. In December 2016, Pope Francis approved Rother's beatification, confirming that he had been killed "in odium fidei" ("in hatred of the faith"). Because of this ruling, no miracle was required for Rother's beatification. In May 2017, as part of the beatification procedure, Rother's remains were exhumed for examination by medical professionals.

Rother was beatified on September 23, 2017, at the Cox Convention Center in Oklahoma City. The beatification mass was attended by 20,000 people. A delegation from Guatemala attended the service. Cardinal Angelo Amato, the CSS prefect, presided at the mass on behalf of Pope Francis. Amato was assisted by Archbishop Paul S. Coakley of Oklahoma City and his predecessor, Archbishop Emeritus Eusebius J. Beltran. Rother became the first American-born priest to be martyred and beatified.

For Rother to become a saint, the Vatican would have to verify a miracle attributed to his intercession.

== Legacy ==
In July 2026, the White House in Washington, D.C. released a statement memorializing the 45th anniversary of Rother's death. The documentary film American Martyr: The Stanley Rother Story, narrated in English by the actor Martin Sheen, was scheduled to be released in theaters in August 2026.

Several church facilities have been named in Rother's honor:

- Blessed Stanley Rother Church, Decatur, Arkansas
- Blessed Stanley Rother House of Formation, a seminary in Baton Rouge, Louisiana
- Blessed Stanley Rother Hispanic Institute, a Spanish-language and culture school at St. Joseph Church in Norman, Oklahoma

=== Shrine ===
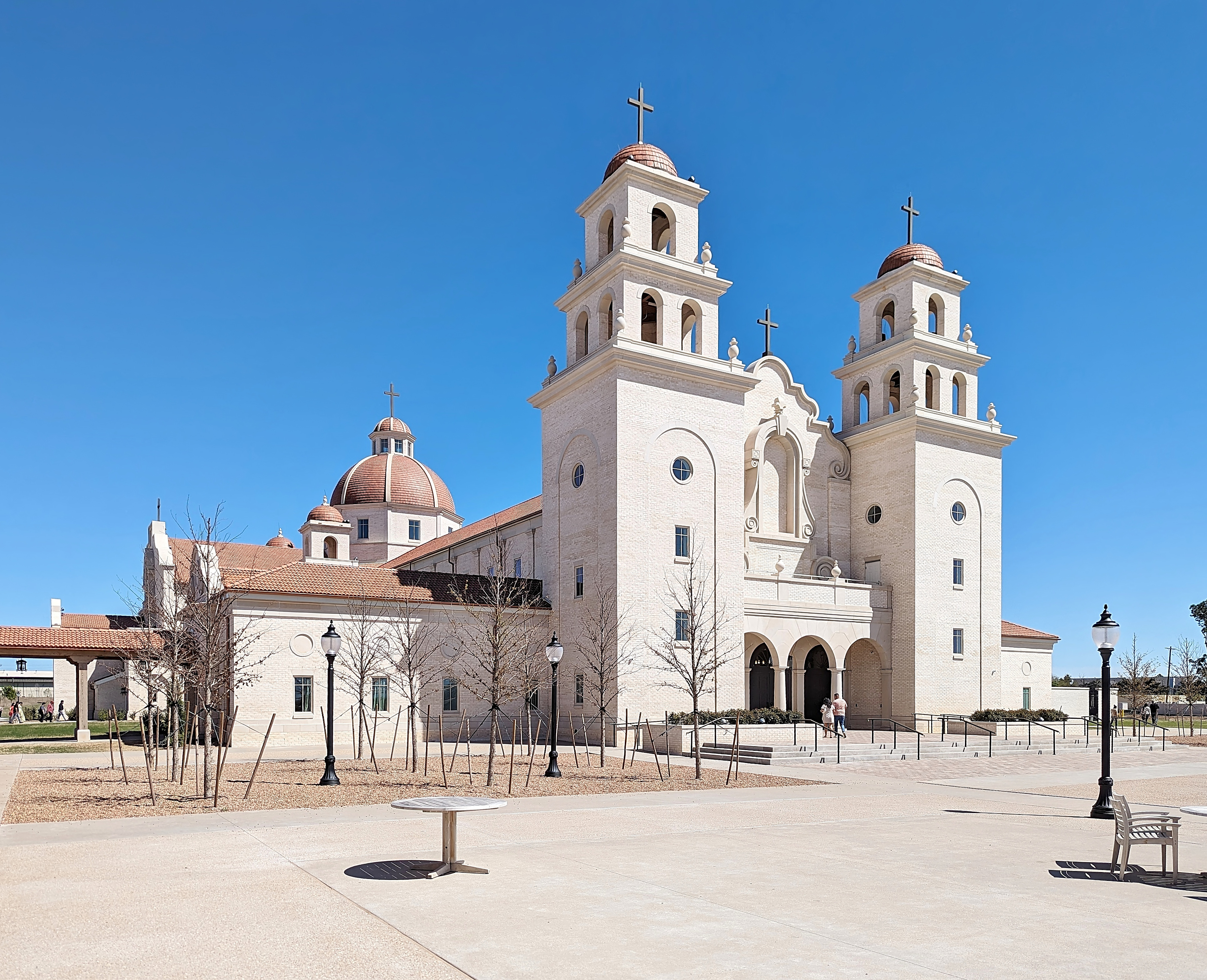
Blessed Stanley Rother Shrine, Oklahoma City

In 2019, the Archdiocese of Oklahoma City broke ground on the Blessed Stanley Rother Shrine, a new church and ministry complex in Oklahoma City. Built in the Spanish Colonial style, the design of the shrine mirrored the Micatokla mission church in Guatemala.

The Rother Shrine was dedicated in a mass in February 2023. A chapel inside the shrine contains Rother's remains. The shrine also features a museum, sanctuary, gift shop, and visitor center. The Rother Shrine is the largest Catholic church in Oklahoma.
