= Martín Prechtel =

American author (born 1951)

- Born: June 19, 1951 (age 75)
- Citizenship: American
- Occupation: writer
- Spouse: Johanna Keller
- Writing career
- Language: English
- Genre: New Age
- Website: floweringmountain.com

Martín Prechtel is an American author and educator.

From New Mexico, he traveled to Guatemala in 1970. There he moved into a Tz'utujil community near Lake Atitlán. He learned their Mayan language and studied with a shaman.

He settled into village life, married a Tz'utujil woman and had a family with her. During the extended Guatemalan civil war, Prechtel and his family fled to the United States for safety. The couple separated, and their two sons joined their father in the United States.

He began teaching, based on his understanding of Maya spirituality and contributed to workshops sponsored by poet Robert Bly, a leader in the Men's Movement. Prechtel has published several nonfiction books drawing from his time in Santiago Atitlán, Guatemala; the first was published in 1998, and the most recent in 2015. Prechtel moved back to New Mexico near Ojo Caliente, where he operates a school. He also lectures and gives workshops on spirituality.

== Early life ==
Martín Prechtel was born in 1951 and grew up Santo Domingo Pueblo near Ojo Caliente, New Mexico. He learned the Keres language as well as English growing up. He claimed that his mother was a First Nations Canadian, and his father a Swiss paleontologist.

== Guatemala ==
In 1970 his mother died and Prechtel ended his first marriage. He started traveling, going south through Mexico and entering Guatemala. After a year of traveling through the country, he settled in a small village near Lake Atitlan, which was inhabited by the Tz'utujil (one of the numerous ethnic Maya peoples). There he met Nicolas Chiviliu Tacaxoy, a respected shaman of the village, who Prechtel says identified him as the student he had prayed for. The American began studying with the Maya shaman.

Prechtel learned the Tzutujil language, married a Tzutujil woman, and helped raise their two sons (a third son died young). When his teacher and mentor Chiviliu died, Prechtel wrote that he became the spiritual leader for the approximately 30,000 people of Santiago Atitlan.

Prechtel also wrote that he joined the Scat Mulaj (the village political body). During his time there, he wrote that he rose to the position of Nabey Mam (the first chief). He was responsible for leading the initiation and ritual passage of the village's young men into adulthood. As the violence of the Guatemalan civil war (1960–1996) increased, when government forces were attacking the Mayan villages in the highlands, Prechtel and his family fled for their lives. In 1984 they settled in the U.S. His wife returned to Guatemala later with their two sons, and the couple divorced. The two boys later returned to the US to live with their father.

Upon resettling in the US, Prechtel was introduced to poet Robert Bly, who was active in leading what he called a Men's Movement. He began contributing to Bly's workshops, and Bly was instrumental in getting Prechtel's writing published, writing the foreword to his first book, which was published in 1998.

== New Mexico ==
Prechtel married again to Johanna Keller, and resides in New Mexico, at the site of the school he founded near Ojo Caliente. The school is called Bolad's Kitchen. Prechtel speaks at different international educational conferences and leads workshops to assist in individuals reconnecting to the sacredness in nature and daily life. In addition, he helps them find a sense of purpose in the modern world. Colleagues include Robert Bly, Malidoma Somé, and Michael J Meade.

== Writing ==
Prechtel has written a trilogy of autobiographical accounts drawing from his life among the Tzʼutujil Maya of Santiago Atitlán, Guatemala. The first, and perhaps best-known, is Secrets of the Talking Jaguar (1998), describing his initiation as a Maya spiritual leader. Robert Bly wrote the foreword. Publishers Weekly said he described his apprenticeship to a shaman and 13 years of living as a Tzutujil, saying "his view seems at times romanticized" but he portrays an "idyllic Indian life" of "colorful rituals and rapport with nature." Long Life, Honey in the Heart (1999) and The Toe Bone and The Tooth (2002) — later republished as Stealing Benefacio's Roses: A Mayan Epic (2006) — interweaves accounts of village life in the 1970s amidst the violence of the Guatemalan Civil War with retellings of ancient Mayan myths. Other writings drawing on his time in Santiago Atitlán include The Disobedience of the Daughter of the Sun (2005), the retelling a Mayan myth, and The Unlikely Peace At Cuchumaquic (2012).

The Smell of Rain on Dust: Grief and Praise (2015) deals with the modern experience of grief and how the absence of praiseworthy things in life robs modern people of the ability to genuinely grieve. Rescuing the Light (2021) collects quotations of Prechtel's teachings at his school in New Mexico, Bolad's Kitchen. The trilogy "Stories of My Horses" — comprising The Mare and the Mouse (2021), The Wild Rose (2022), and The Canyon Wren (2023) — pay tribute to the horses of Prechtel's youth and of his life since his return to New Mexico.

Prechtel has recorded audiobooks of several of his books, including The Unlikely Peace at Chuchamaquic (2020), The Smell of Rain on Dust (2020), Rescuing the Light (2021), The Disobedience of the Daughter of the Sun (2021), Stealing Benefacio's Roses (2021) Long Life, Honey in the Heart (2022), The Mare and the Mouse (2021) and The Wild Rose (2022).

His works also include paintings and many musical endeavors.

== Bibliography ==
=== Collaborative works ===
==== With Robert S. Carlsen ====
- Prechtel, Martin & Carlsen, Robert S. (1988). “Weaving and Cosmos Amongst the Tzutujil Maya of Guatemala.” Res: Anthropology and Aesthetics 15: 122-132. (doi:10.1086/RESv15n1ms20166789).
- Carlsen, Robert S.; & Prechtel, Martín. (1991). “The Flowering of the Dead: An Interpretation of Highland Maya Culture.” Man 26(1): 23-42. (doi:10.2307/2803473).
- Carlsen, Robert S. & Prechtel, Martín. (1994). “Walking on Two Legs: Shamanism in Santiago Atitlán.” In Gary Seaman & Jane S. Day (eds.), Ancient Traditions: Shamanism in Central Asia and the Americas. Niwot, CO: University Press of Colorado. ISBN 978-0870812835 (1994 hb); ISBN 978-0870813429 (2007 pb).
- Carlsen, Robert S. & Prechtel, Martín. (1997). “The Flowering of the Dead.” In Robert S. Carlsen, The War for the Heart & Soul of a Highland Maya Town, first edition. Austin, TX: University of Texas Press. ISBN 0292711948 (pb). A later version of the 1991 journal article.
- Carlsen, Robert S. & Prechtel, Martín. (2011). “The Flowering of the Dead.” In The War for the Heart & Soul of a Highland Maya Town, Revised Edition. Austin, TX: University of Texas Press. ISBN 978-0292723986 (pb); ISBN 978-0292734760 (ebook).

==== With Nathaniel Tarn ====
- Pospoy, Jacinto Cua. (1981). “Thirty Years Later: The Estados Unidos Goes to the Moon.” Translated from the Tzutujil Maya by Martín Prechtel and Nathaniel Tarn. Sulfur (1): 21-27. (Retrieved 21 Jul 2026).
- Tarn, Nathaniel & Prechtel, Martin. (1981). “Metaphors of Relative Elevation, Position and Ranking in Popol Vuh.” Estudios de Cultura Maya 13: 105-123. doi:10.19130/iifl.ecm.1981.13.537. (Epub 15 Feb 2013).
- Tarn, Nathaniel & Prechtel, Martin. (1986). “Constant Inconstancy: The Feminine Principle in Atiteco Mythology.” In Gary H. Gossen (ed.), Symbol and Meaning Beyond the Closed Community: Essays in Mesoamerican Ideas, pp. 173–184. Albany, NY: Institute for Mesoamerican Studies, State University of New York at Albany. ISBN 9780942041101.
- Tarn, Nathaniel & Prechtel, Martin. (1990). “‘Comiéndose La Fruta’: Metáforas Sexuales e Iniciaciones en Santiago Atitlán” (‘Eating the Fruit’: Sexual Metaphor and Inititiation in Santiago Atitlán). Mesoamérica 11(19): 73-82. (Retrieved 12 Jul 2026).
- Tarn, Nathaniel & Prechtel, Martin. (1997). Scandals in the House of Birds: Shamans and Priests on Lake Atitlán. New York: Marsilio Publishers. ISBN 978-1568860442.
- Tarn, Nathaniel & Prechtel, Martín. (1997). “Stories of the Early Earth, Guatemala.” Grand Street 62: 24-35. doi:10.2307/25008197.

=== Solo works ===
- Prechtel, Martin. (1990). Grandmother Sweat Bath: A Story of the Tzutujil Maya. Santa Fe, NM: Weaselsleeves Press. ISBN 9781878460004 (limited printing).
- Prechtel, Martín. (1998). Secrets of the Talking Jaguar: A Mayan Shaman’s Journey to the Heart of the Indigenous Soul. New York: Jeremy P. Tarcher. ISBN 9780874779004 (hardback).
- Prechtel, Martín. (1999). Secrets of the Talking Jaguar: Memoirs From the Living Heart of a Mayan Village. New York: Jeremy P. Tarcher/Putnam. ISBN 0-87477-970-7 (trade paperback).
- Prechtel, Martín. (1999). Long Life, Honey in the Heart: A Story of Initiation and Eloquence From the Shores of a Mayan Lake. New York: Jeremy P. Tarcher/Putnam. ISBN 9780874779943 (hardback).
- Prechtel, Martín. (2002). The Toe Bone and the Tooth: An Ancient Mayan Story Relived in Modern Times: Leaving Home to Come Home. London: Thorsons. ISBN 978-0007142675. (Republished in 2006 as Stealing Benefacio’s Roses.)
- Prechtel, Martín. (2004). Long Life, Honey in the Heart: A Story of Initiation and Eloquence From the Shores of a Mayan Lake. Berkeley, CA: North Atlantic Books. ISBN 9781556435386 (paperback).
- Prechtel, Martín. (2005; 2013 ebook). The Disobedience of the Daughter of the Sun: A Mayan Tale of Ecstasy, Time, and Finding One’s True Form. Berkeley, CA: North Atlantic Books. ISBN 9781556436000 (paperback); ISBN 978-1583948309 (ebook).
- Prechtel, Martín. (2006; 2013 ebook). Stealing Benefacio’s Roses: A Mayan Epic. Berkeley, CA: North Atlantic Books. ISBN 978-1556435874 (paperback); ISBN 978-1583948316 (ebook). (Retitled publication of 2002’s The Toe Bone and the Tooth.)
- Prechtel, Martín. (2012). The Unlikely Peace At Cuchumaquic: The Parallel Lives of People as Plants: Keeping the Seeds Alive. Berkeley, CA: North Atlantic Book. ISBN 978-1583943601 (hardback); ISBN 978-1583943762 (ebook).
- Prechtel, Martín. (2015). The Smell of Rain on Dust: Grief and Praise. Berkeley, CA: North Atlantic Books. ISBN 978-1583949399 (paperback); ISBN 978-1583949405 (ebook).
- Prechtel, Martín. (2021). Rescuing the Light: Quotes From the Oral Teachings of Martín Prechtel. Berkeley, CA: North Atlantic Books. ISBN 978-1623176273 (paperback); ISBN 978-1623176280 (ebook).
- Prechtel, Martín. (2021). The Mare and the Mouse: Stories of My Horses: Volume I. Clearwater, MN: North Star Press of St. Cloud. ISBN 978-1682011171 (hardback); ISBN 978-1682011195 (ebook).
- Prechtel, Martín. (2022). The Wild Rose: Stories of My Horses: Volume II. Clearwater, MN: North Star Press of St. Cloud. ISBN 978-1682011249 (hardback); ISBN 978-1682011263 (ebook)).
- Prechtel, Martín. (2023). The Canyon Wren: Stories of My Horses: Volume III. Clearwater, MN: North Star Press of St. Cloud. ISBN 978-1682011294 (hardback); ISBN 978-1682011317 (ebook).

== See also ==
- New Age
- Maya peoples
