= Tzʼutujil people =

Indigenous Maya people of Guatemala

Tzʼutujil
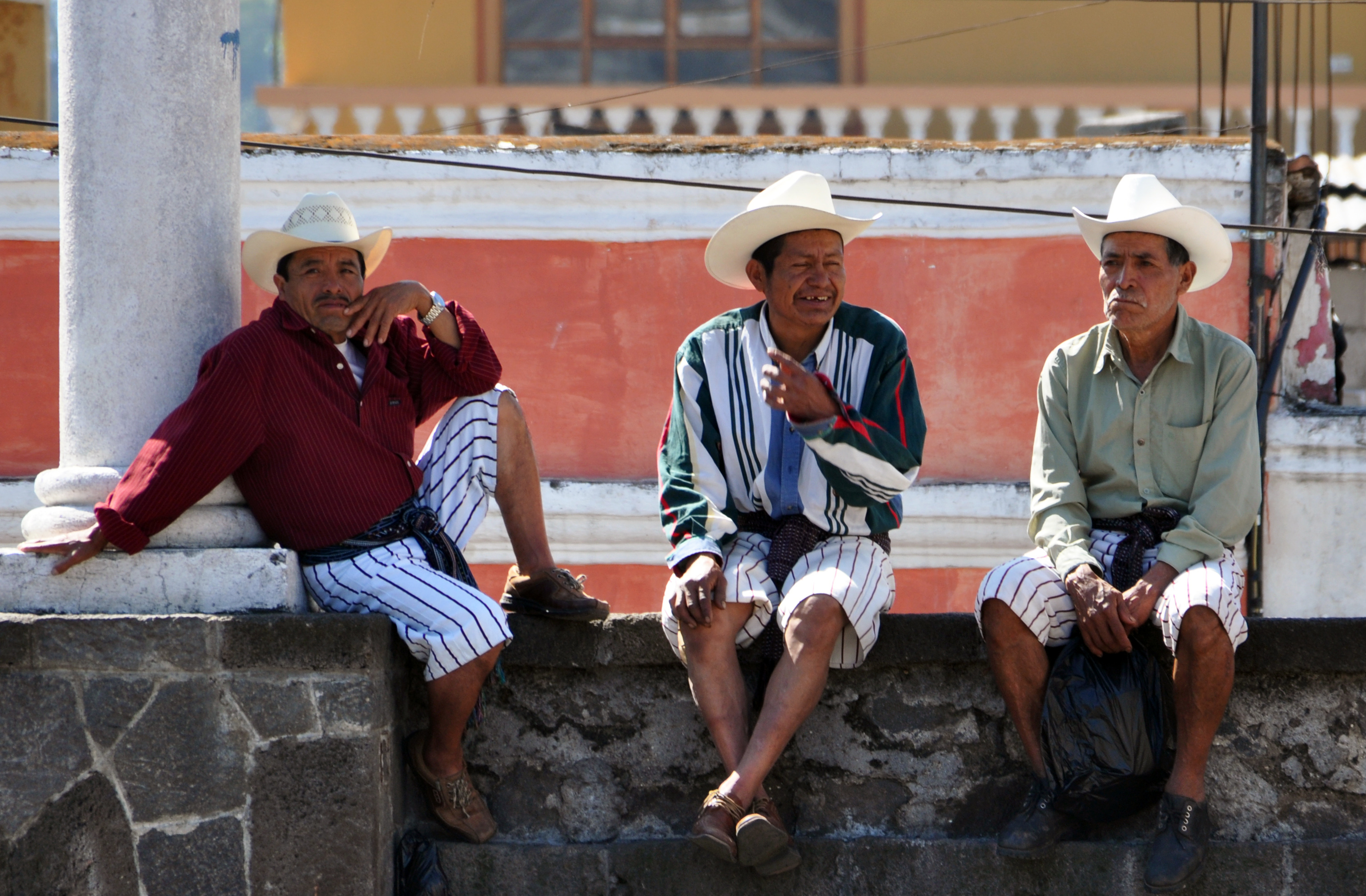
- Tzʼutujil men in Santiago Atitlán

Total population
- 106,012

Regions with significant populations

Languages
- Tzʼutujil; Spanish

Religion
- Catholic, Evangelical, Maya Religion

Related ethnic groups
- Achi, Kaqchikel, Kʼicheʼ

The Tzʼutujil (Tzutujil, Tzutuhil, Sutujil) are an Indigenous people, one of the 22 Maya ethnic groups that live in Guatemala. Together with the Xinca, Garífunas (Black Caribs) and the Ladinos, they make up the 25 ethnic groups in the country. Approximately 100,000 Tzʼutujil live in the area around Lake Atitlán. Their pre-Columbian capital, near Santiago Atitlán, was Chuitinamit. In pre-Columbian times, the Tzʼutujil nation was a part of the ancient Maya civilization.

The arrival of the Spanish during the sixteenth century lead to the implementation of the cofradía religious system. In the nineteenth century, the nation transitioned to a capitalist economy.

The Tzʼutujil are noted for their continuing adherence to traditional Atiteco cultural and religious practices. Weaving and traditional songs are historically religiously significant practices. Some also practice Evangelical Protestantism or Roman Catholicism. They speak the Tzʼutujil language, a member of the Mayan language family.

== History and demographics ==
=== Precolonial history ===
The Tzʼutujil date from the post-classic period (circa 900–1500) of the Maya civilization. They inhabit the southern watershed of Lake Atitlán, in what is now defined as the Solola region of the Guatemalan highlands.

The ancestors of the Tz'utujil moved to their present location from Tollan, the ancient capital of the Toltecs. Near Lake Atitlán, they established their capital Chiaa (meaning “close to the water”) on the hill of Chuitinamit. The leadership in Chiaa consisted of the supreme lord, the Ahtz'iquinahay (Lord of the House), and a lesser supreme lord, the Tz’utujil, who named the group after himself. South of Santiago Atitlan, the Ahtz'iquinahay and his lords ran cacao plantations. In the fifteenth century, the Ki’che’ ruler Quicab prevented westward migration through military violence against the Tz’utujil people.

In 1523 the Spanish conquistador Pedro de Alvarado, with the help of the Kaqchikel Maya, defeated them in a battle close to the town of Panajachel. At that time they lost a portion of their lands, and the control of the lake.

=== Colonial history ===
==== Christianization ====
In the sixteenth century, Franciscan Friars Francisco de la Parra and Pedro de Betanços moved the capital to Santiago Atitlán and constructed a monastery, believing that moving the capital away from the hill of Chuitinamit would facilitate in converting the Tz'utujil to Christianity.

In 1533, the Spanish implemented cofradía organizations in Guatemala as a means of Christianization. These organizations are dedicated to specific Catholic saints and also served as a way for the Spanish to collect revenue from the Mayan people. The Tz'utujil community has never had over ten cofradías at a given time, but larger indigenous communities sometimes have up to twenty cofradías. Although the cofradías were intended to be Catholic sites, the Tz’utujil people participated in ritual activity that was more in line with indigenous practices than Catholic practices, such as idolatry. Economically, Mayan leaders used the revenue collection from the cofradías as a means of bargaining with priests to gain favors. The Mayan communities would protest against priests who did not comply with the leaders’ offers by doing things such as intentionally not paying the priests and attacking the priests’ public images.

==== Demographics ====
The Tz'utujil population was estimated to decrease from 72,000 in 1520 to 48,000 in 1525 to 5,600 in 1550 to 5,300 in 1575. Geographer Dr. W. George Lovell suspects that the population decline is linked to an outbreak of either smallpox, measles, influenza, pneumonic plague, or exanthematic typhus originating from an outbreak amongst the Kachiquel Maya. Anthropologist Dr. Sandra L. Orellana suggests that additional causes of death among the Tz’utujil during the colonial era are gold mining and battles with the Spanish.

=== 20th-century land distribution ===
In the 19th century, Guatemala transitioned to a capitalist economy and in the 20th century, Guatemalan leaders expropriated agricultural lands that belonged to indigenous people to the non-indigenous. This process created estates called fincas that were not owned by indigenous people. At the beginning of the century, 95 fincas had Tz’utujil workers working under debt peonages. By 1928, 80% of Tz’utujil people worked under debt peonages. Anthropologist Robert S. Carlsen reports that in 1990, fewer than a quarter of Tz’utujil people did not have enough land to provide sufficient food for themselves and their families.

=== 1990 massacre in Santiago Atitlán ===
As part of the Guatemalan genocide, guerilla violence occurred near Lake Atitlán in the 1980s. In June 1980, the guerrilla group, Organization of People in Arms, recruited citizens in the region. By December of that year, ten disappearances through guerilla force were reported. Throughout the decade, guerilla violence persisted against the Tz’utujil people as the guerilla army murdered hundreds. Following the 1985 election of Vinicio Cerezo Arévalo and terror in 1987, the guerilla violence was reduced in the region.

On December 1, 1990, five local soldiers became intoxicated then injured a 19-year-old from Santiago Atitlán while trying to invade a cantina and a private residence. The next day, thousands of citizens of Santiago Atitlán protested the soldiers’ behavior while holding white flags. The soldiers fired shots into the crowd of citizens, killing 14 people and injuring 21. As a result of the massacre, the army was forced to leave the garrison, leading to the removal of a military base from Santiago Atitlán.

=== Contemporary demographics ===
Today they dwell primarily in the towns of San Juan La Laguna, San Pablo La Laguna, San Marcos La Laguna, San Pedro La Laguna, Santiago Atitlán, Panabaj, Tzanchaj (believed to have been the inspiration, because of its similar sound, for the name "Santiago"), with fewer in San Lucas Tolimán.

In 2005, several hundred Tzʼutujil died in the mudslides caused by Hurricane Stan. Rescuers recovered 160 bodies from Panabaj and Tzanchaj, while a total of 250 persons remained missing from both towns.

== Atiteco religion and culture ==
=== Santo Mundo ===
Santo Mundo is the Holy World and cosmos in the traditional religion of the Tz’utujil people. It is believed to be a body that carries water and grows trees, flowers, and food. Mountains are thought to be the nose of this body. Santo Mundo changes based on the actions of people. Santo Mundo is also seen as a womb to hold the Maize God. Santo Mundo has five directions: the center and four corners. The center, or central plaza, is thought of as “the Heart,” which is thought to be an intersection of four roads and contains a sixteenth-century church. The corners are the points where the sun, known as “Our Father the Sun”, rises and sets during solstices. The hemisphere that the sun travels through is known as the world of the living and the hemisphere below the sun's path is the underworld.

=== Spirits ===
In Tz'utujil communities, spirits are believed to control the natural world, other spirits, and people's destinies.

Traditional customs come from Nawals, which are spirits known as “Ancient Ones”. The “Ancient Ones” are believed to be ancient Tz’utujil people who gained divine status. Their guardian spirit was Old Mam, the trickster deity, who taught them the customs that now belong to the Tz’utujil. It is believed that when the Tz’utujil pray, make sacrifices, and give offerings to the Nawals, the Nawals give them health, luck, and good weather to help with agriculture in return. Since the arrival of the Spanish, the Nawals have been worshipped in cofradías.

Jawal spirits can be classified into guardians, or chalbeij, who control different locations on Earth and the Spirit Lords, known as Martins which are thought to be reincarnations of San Martín, the Spirit Lord of Earth . The Martins are thought to control nature. In the cofradías, statues of Catholic saints, or “Santos,” are seen as manifestations of these Spirit Lords. The highest spirit is known as Dio's; the name comes from the Spanish word for God, Dios, but does not represent the same deity.

=== Life cycle ===
The Tz’utujil have a cyclical, rather than linear concept of time. They follow a concept known as Jaloj-K’exoj, which is composed of two types of change, jal, and kex. Jal is change that happens to an individual as they progress through their lives. K’ex is a change symbolic of the transition between generations through reincarnation; children are thought to be reincarnations of other family members, most often grandparents. The Tz’utujil visualize Jaloj-K’exoj through considering the maize plant. When a maize plant dies, it scatters seed, which corresponds to the birth of a human. The plant's growth symbolizes a person aging and going through jal. When the plant dies, it scatters its seed, repeating the process for a new plant, which symbolizes the transitions between individuals and their ancestors.

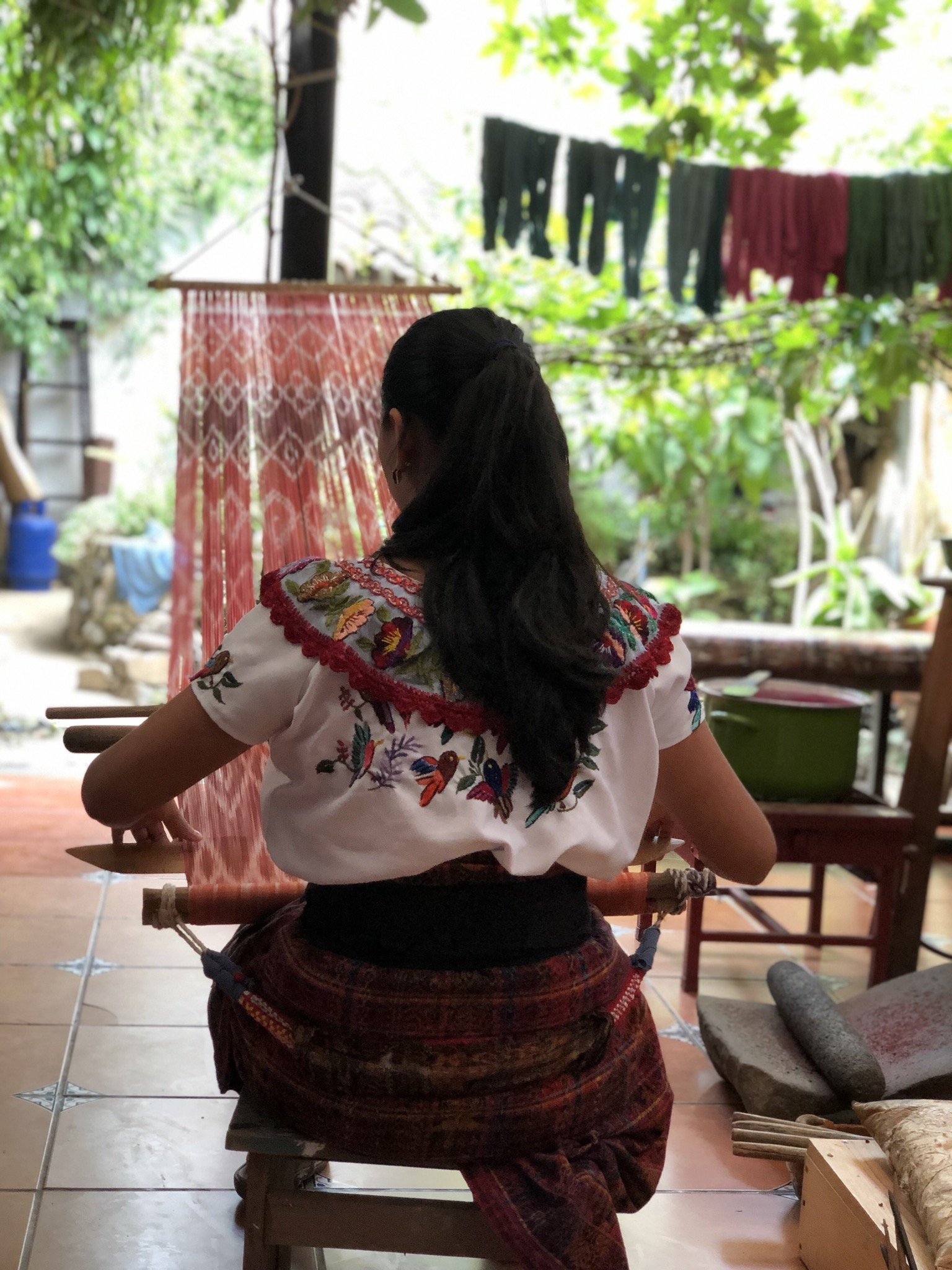
A Tzʼutujil woman weaves using a back-strap loom.

=== Traditional songs ===
The Tz’utujil use traditional songs, known as b’ix, as a means of connecting with the spiritual world. The songs are sung by an ajb’ix, meaning songman. The songs are used to show gratitude to spirits, protect people from illness and witchcraft, and cause pain to one's enemies. There also exist courting songs which compare sexual organs and desires to how rain fertilizes crops.

=== Role of weaving ===
For the Tz’utujil, weaving connects to the concept of fertility as Mayan people view the moon as an ancestral Grandmother and the goddess of weaving and birthing. The production of weavings is seen as a birthing process. Symbolically, the rope in the loom, known as yujkut represents the umbilical cord and the sticks on the loom represent thirteen female deities called the Ixoc Ahauaua.

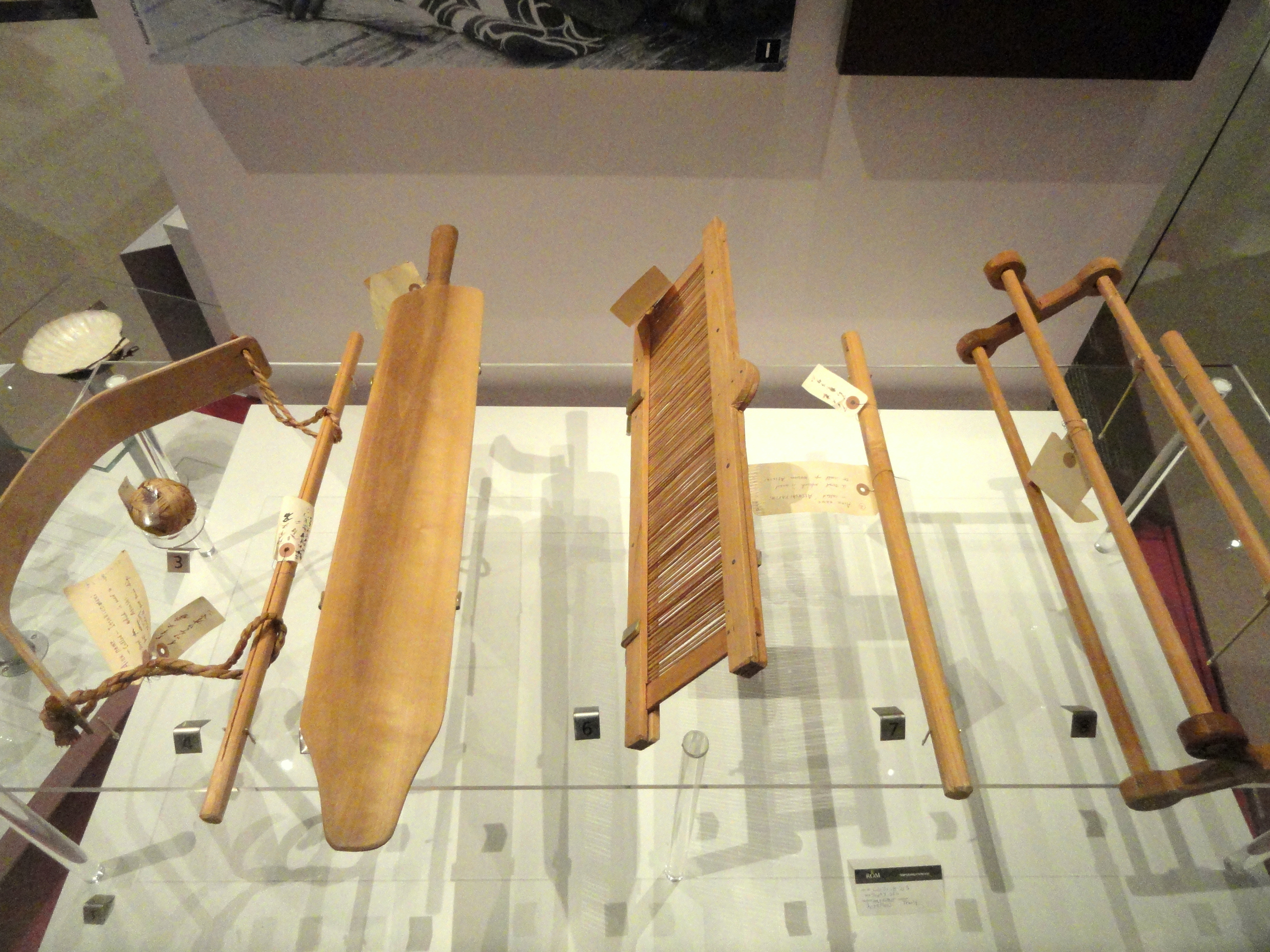
Photo of a backstrap loom.

The Tz’utujil women use a backstrap loom. Traditionally, the women used x’cajcoj zut fabric. X’cajoj is the brown cotton material of which the cloth is composed. The term zut means the cloth is more long than wide. In contemporary times, women have been using more commercially produced yarns that lead to a greater variety of color. Regardless of material used, Tz’utujil weavings consistently contain a yellow stripe going through the center of the cloth and six silk tassels. Yellow symbolizes abundance and the yellow stripe is a symbol for the “Abundance Road,” which refers to the sun's path between 6 AM and 6 PM. Four silk tassels are placed on each corner of the cloth, with a tassel placed on each of the shorter sides. The tassels on the corners represent the sun rising and setting during the solstices. The long sides of the cloth symbolize the sun's path between noon and midnight.

== Economics ==
Tourism has provided a market for artists and weavers. Although tourism is now an increasing source of income in the region, many Tzʼutujil still practice traditional methods of farming of the two main crops in the region, coffee and maize (corn). The Tz'utujil also farm beans, fruit, and vegetables. The Tz'utujil farm using volcanic plains and trade their crops for commodities from indigenous groups in other towns.

Labor is divided by gender in Santiago Atitlán. Men farm, collect firewood, and participate in commercial-based activities, whereas women cook, provide water, weave, and shop. According to Orellana, few couples get divorced because of the economic necessity to perform these gendered tasks. Orellana claims that single adults are looked down upon in society because of their obligation to perform the tasks of both genders in order to support themselves.

San Juan is one of three Tzʼutujil communities where artists have adapted the international genre of Arte Naif to express the cultural traditions, beliefs, ceremonies, and daily activities of their indigenous culture. This form of art and some of its most accomplished Tzʼutjil practitioners have been recognized in the definitive UNESCO-sponsored book on the subject, Arte Naif: Contemporary Guatemalan Mayan Painting (1998). The weavers of San Juan are among the few indigenous artisans who make their own dyes for the yarns they use; they produce the dyes largely from locally grown plants.

== See also ==
- Ixchel
- Maya calendar
- Maya mythology
- Father Stanley Rother, a priest from the Archdiocese of Oklahoma City, who died in 1981, martyred in the mission area. He had translated the Bible into Tzʼutujil and used his family knowledge of farming to aid the people, who grew to respect him. (Pope Francis beatified him in September 2017.)
- Martín Prechtel, New Age author who writes of his experiences with the Tzutujil people.
