= Albert Eischen =

Luxembourgish cyclist

Personal information
- Born: 26 December 1899
- Died: 3 November 1949 (aged 49)

Cycling career
- Sport: Cycling
- Discipline: Road
- Role: Rider

Albert Eischen (26 December 1899 – 3 November 1949) was a Luxembourgish racing cyclist. He rode in the 1925 Tour de France.
