= Okarche, Oklahoma =

Town in Oklahoma, US

- Town
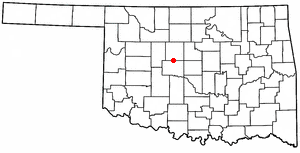
- Location of Okarche, Oklahoma
- Coordinates: 35°43′30″N 97°58′33″W
- Country: United States
- State: Oklahoma
- Counties: Kingfisher, Canadian

Area
  - Total: 2.24 sq mi (5.81 km^{2})
  - Land: 2.20 sq mi (5.70 km^{2})
  - Water: 0.042 sq mi (0.11 km^{2})
- Elevation: 1,240 ft (380 m)

Population (2020)
  - Total: 1,141
  - Density: 518.6/sq mi (200.22/km^{2})
- Time zone: UTC-6 (Central (CST))
  - Summer (DST): UTC-5 (CDT)
- ZIP code: 73762
- Area codes: 405/572
- FIPS code: 40-54050
- GNIS feature ID: 2413074

Okarche (/oʊˈkɑːrtʃi/ oh-KAR-chee) is a town in Canadian and Kingfisher Counties in Oklahoma, United States, that is part of the Oklahoma City metropolitan area. Its population was 1,141 as of the 2020 United States census.

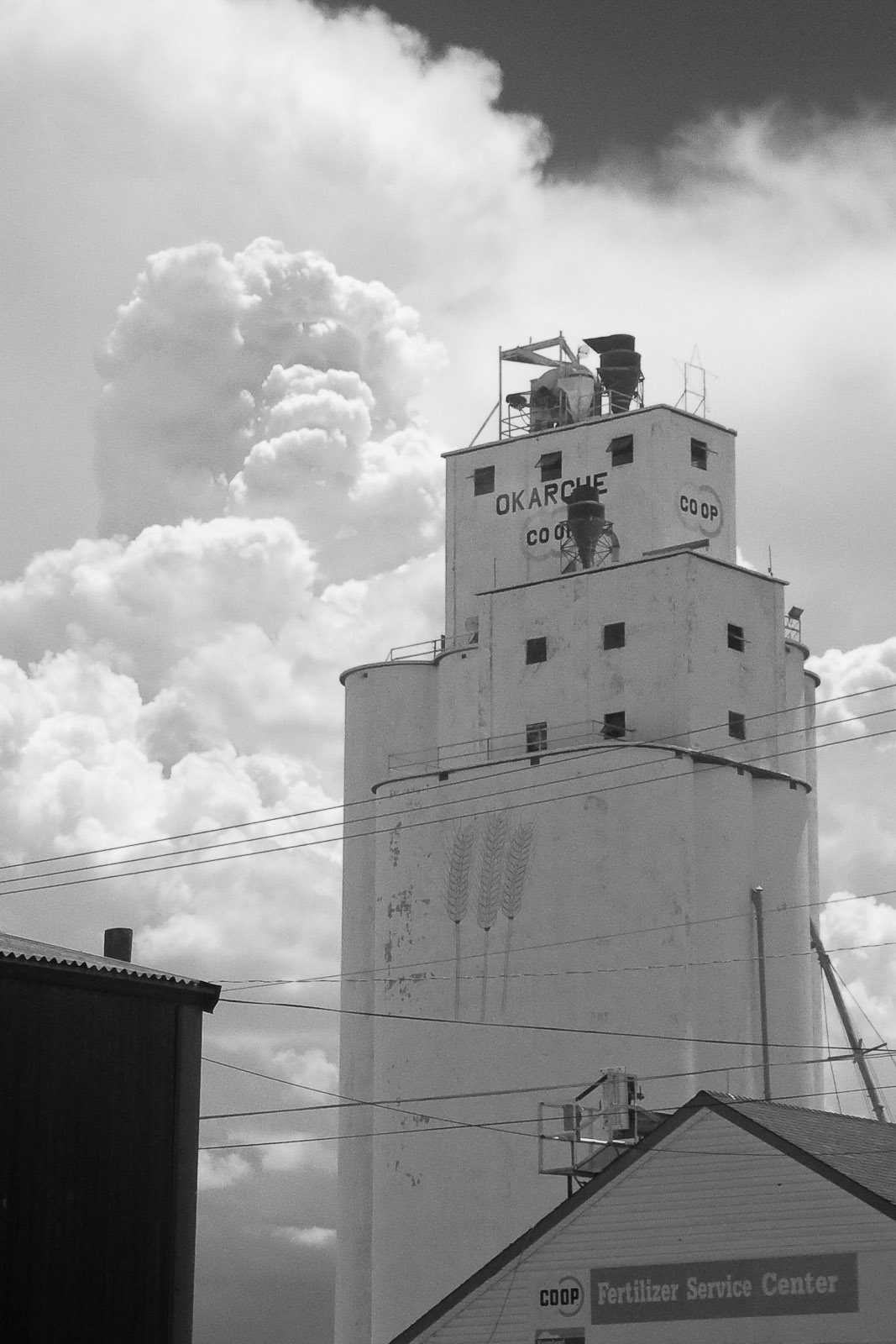
Grain elevator in Okarche, 2005

== History ==
Okarche is located on land that before 1830 was within the historic area of the Wichita people. The location was in territory assigned to the Creek and Seminole people when removal of tribes from the Southeastern United States began in 1830. After the Civil War, parts of Indian Territory were designated for resettlement of Plains Indians. The site of the future town of Okarche was just inside the eastern border of the Cheyenne and Arapaho reservation.

From 1867 to 1884, cattle were driven through the area on the Chisholm Trail from Texas to railheads in Kansas. Later, the Chicago, Rock Island and Pacific Railroad and the state road which would become the Meridian Highway and U.S. Highway 81 would follow roughly the same route through Oklahoma Territory.

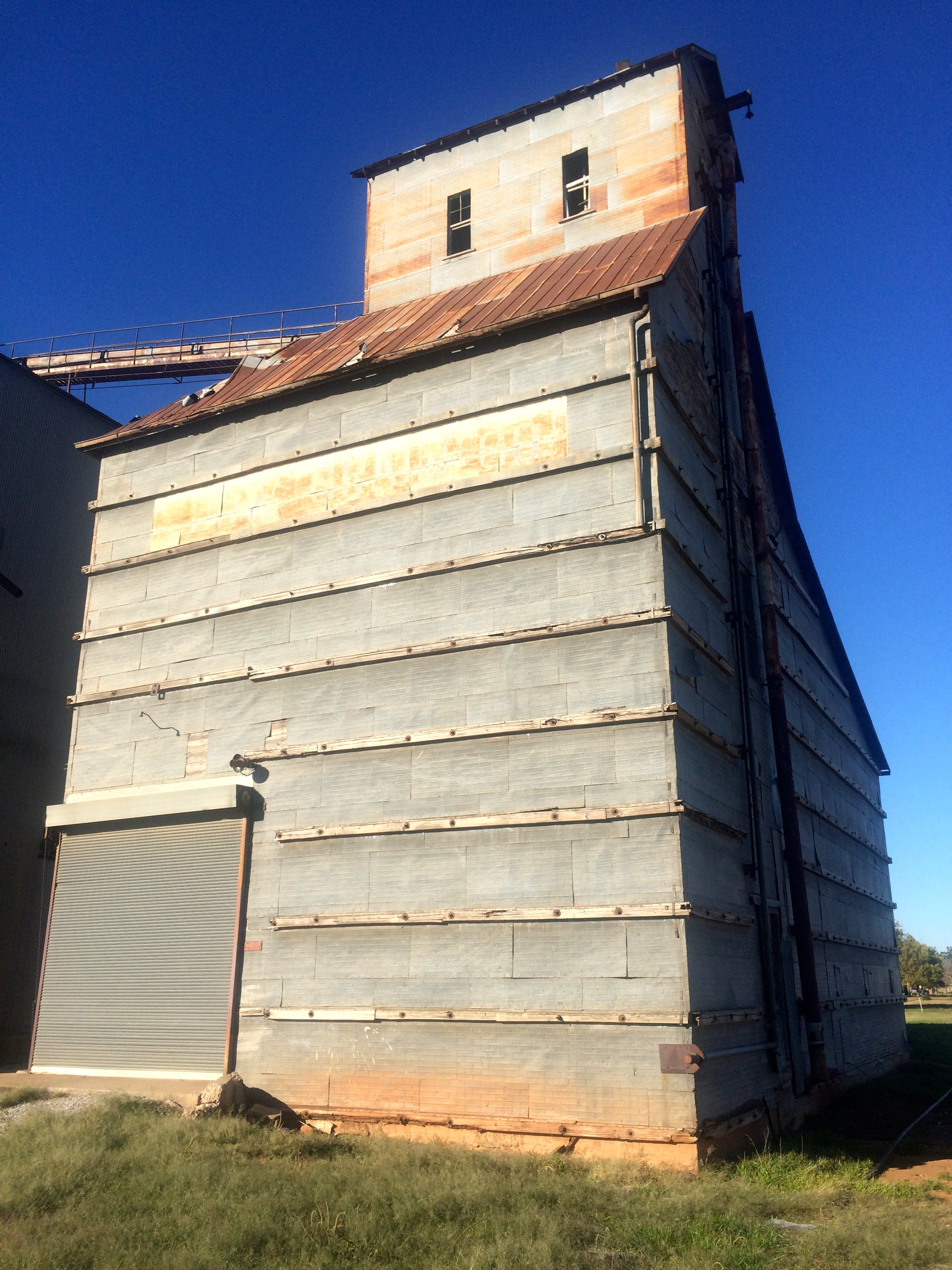
Dow Grain Company Elevator in Okarche

On March 2, 1887, the U.S. Congress approved construction of a railroad through Indian Territory. The Chicago, Kansas and Nebraska Railway was given a 100-foot (30 m) right-of-way through the territory and authorized to take additional right-of-way for stations every 10 miles (16 km) of track. Railway assets would be turned over to the CRI&P in June 1890. Construction proceeded southward from Caldwell, Kansas, and was completed to Pond Creek by April 1889 and to El Reno in January 1890. The railway depot where Okarche was platted was completed at that time.

The Okarche post office was established June 28, 1890. Cheyenne and Arapaho lands were opened to settlement by land run on April 19, 1892. The town was incorporated in 1905 – two years before statehood. The name of the town is a portmanteau, derived from parts of three words, Oklahoma (OK), Arapaho (AR), and Cheyenne (CHE). The Southern Arapaho and Cheyenne Native American tribes had been relocated to Oklahoma from the northern Great Plains in the late 19th century. The town's population hovered in the 400s for more than three decades after statehood had risen to over 1,200 by 2010.

By the late 1890s, German immigrants were a greater part of the population, and German was a widely used language of the community. Many had come to America in the wave of 1.5 million German immigrants to the United States in the 1880s and lived in states to the north such as Iowa, Nebraska, or Missouri before coming to Oklahoma Territory. Catholic and Lutheran churches with schools were established as immigrants sought to keep faith and customs from the old country alive in their new home. St. John's Lutheran Church was founded in 1892 and Holy Trinity Catholic Church in 1893. Worship and education were conducted principally in German until American entry into World War I in 1917. Bilingual worship continued for about two decades.

When federal highway numbering was implemented in November 1926, the Meridian Highway through Okarche was designated U.S. Route 81 and fully paved in the Okarche area by 1931. The Northwest Highway (Oklahoma State Highway 3) was opened as a gravel-surfaced road in 1939 and fully paved by 1947. Okarche now has four-lane, divided highway access to neighboring communities, including the Oklahoma City metro area. The CR&IP Railroad entered its final bankruptcy in 1975. The Union Pacific Railroad now operates on the former Rock Island route.

== Geography ==
Okarche is located on the boundary of Kingfisher and Canadian Counties. U.S. Route 81 leads south 14 miles (23 km) to El Reno and 16 miles (26 km) to Interstate 40, and 10 miles (16 km) north of Kingfisher. Oklahoma State Highway 3 leads southeast 34 miles (55 km) to Oklahoma City.

According to the United States Census Bureau, Okarche has a total area of 1.9 square miles (4.9 km^{2}), of which 0.0 acres (0.007 m^{2}), or 0.14%, is covered by water.

== Demographics ==
Historical population
Census	Pop.	Note	%±
1910	402		—
1920	449		11.7%
1930	482		7.3%
1940	453		−6.0%
1950	532		17.4%
1960	584		9.8%
1970	826		41.4%
1980	1,000		21.1%
1990	1,160		16.0%
2000	1,110		−4.3%
2010	1,215		9.5%
2020	1,141		−6.1%

=== 2020 census ===
As of the 2020 census, Okarche had a population of 1,141. The median age was 39.9 years; 23.9% of residents were under 18 and 19.0% were 65 or older. For every 100 females, there were 99.5 males, and for every 100 females 18 and over, there were 98.6 males 18 and over. None of the residents lived in urban areas, while 100.0% lived in rural areas.

Of the 435 households in Okarche, 34.7% had children under 18 living in them, 59.8% were married-couple households, 14.9% were households with a male householder and no spouse or partner present, and 23.2% were households with a female householder and no spouse or partner present. About 24.4% of all households were made up of individuals, and 12.9% had someone living alone who was 65 years of age or older.

The town had 479 housing units, of which 9.2% were vacant. The homeowner vacancy rate was 2.3% and the rental vacancy rate was 18.1%.

Racial composition as of the 2020 census
Race	Number	Percentage
White	1,017	89.1%
Black or African American	3	0.3%
American Indian and Alaska Native	25	2.2%
Asian	0	0.0%
Native Hawaiian and other Pacific Islander	3	0.3%
Some other race	18	1.6%
Two or more races	75	6.6%
Hispanics or Latinos (of any race)	54	4.7%

=== 2010 census ===
As of the census of 2010, 1,215 people, 468 households, and 321 families were residing in the town, with 496 housing units. The racial makeup of the town was 92.8% White, 0.6% African American, 2.3% Native American, 2.3% from other races, and 2.0% from two or more races. Hispanics or Latinos of any race were 5.4% of the population.

Of the 468 households, 28.2% had children under 18 living with them, 57.3% were married couples living together, 8.1% had a female householder with no husband present, and 31.4% were not families. About 29.3% of all households were made up of individuals, and 15.0% had someone living alone who was 65 or older. The average household size was 2.40, and the average family size was 2.99.

In the town, the age distribution was 22.9% under 18, 5.9% from 18 to 24, 24.9% from 25 to 44, 28.7% from 45 to 64, and 17.6% who were 65 or older. The median age was 41.8 years. For every 100 females, there were 93.2 males. For every 100 females 18 and over, there were 86.3 males.

=== Income and poverty ===
According to the 2013 American Community Survey, the median income for a household in the town was $54,688 and for a family was $76,250. Males had a median income of $50,682 versus $31,250 for females. The per capita income for the town was $32,547. About 6.1% of families and 15.3% of the population were below the poverty line, including 13.7% of those under 18 and 6.5% of those 65 or over.

== Economy ==
The town is best known for Eischen's Bar, which claims to be "the oldest bar" in the state of Oklahoma and is famous for its secret-recipe fried chicken. In 2009, Food Network's program, Guy Fieri's Diners, Drive-Ins and Dives, visited Eischen's, and the bar was featured on the television show.

The town was also used as a filming location for the film "Twisters", the sequel to the film "Twister" from 1996.

Major employers include Nortek, formerly Temtrol, a manufacturer of air-handling units, coils and fans, and OEM Systems, a firm specializing in custom fitting commercial vehicles and fuel conversion of vehicles to compressed natural gas.

== Notable people ==
- Brooks Douglass, American actor, film producer, lawyer, businessman, and Oklahoma state senator, he survived a deadly home invasion which killed his parents in Okarche in 1979.
- Daniel Henry Mueggenborg, Roman Catholic bishop
- Stanley Rother, martyred Roman Catholic priest and candidate for sainthood
- Chris Schroder, right-handed pitcher for the Washington Nationals

== See also ==
- List of cities and towns in Oklahoma
