= Eischen's Bar =

Coordinates: 35.72542°N 97.97552°W

Restaurant information
- Location: Okarche, Oklahoma, USA
- Website: eischensbar.com

Eischen's Bar is a bar and restaurant in Okarche, Oklahoma Established in 1896, it is the oldest bar in the state.

== History ==
Eischen Bar was built by Peter Eischen as a watering hole in Oklahoma City in 1896. It closed during Prohibition and reopened in the 1930s under the management of Peter’s son, Nick.

Nick went on a hunting trip in the 1940s and won an 1800s spanish handmade backbar that was added to the watering hole. A fire struck the bar in 1993 which destroyed its memorabilia that lined the walls. Nick's grandsons, Ed Eischen, and Paul, opened the bar in less than a year.

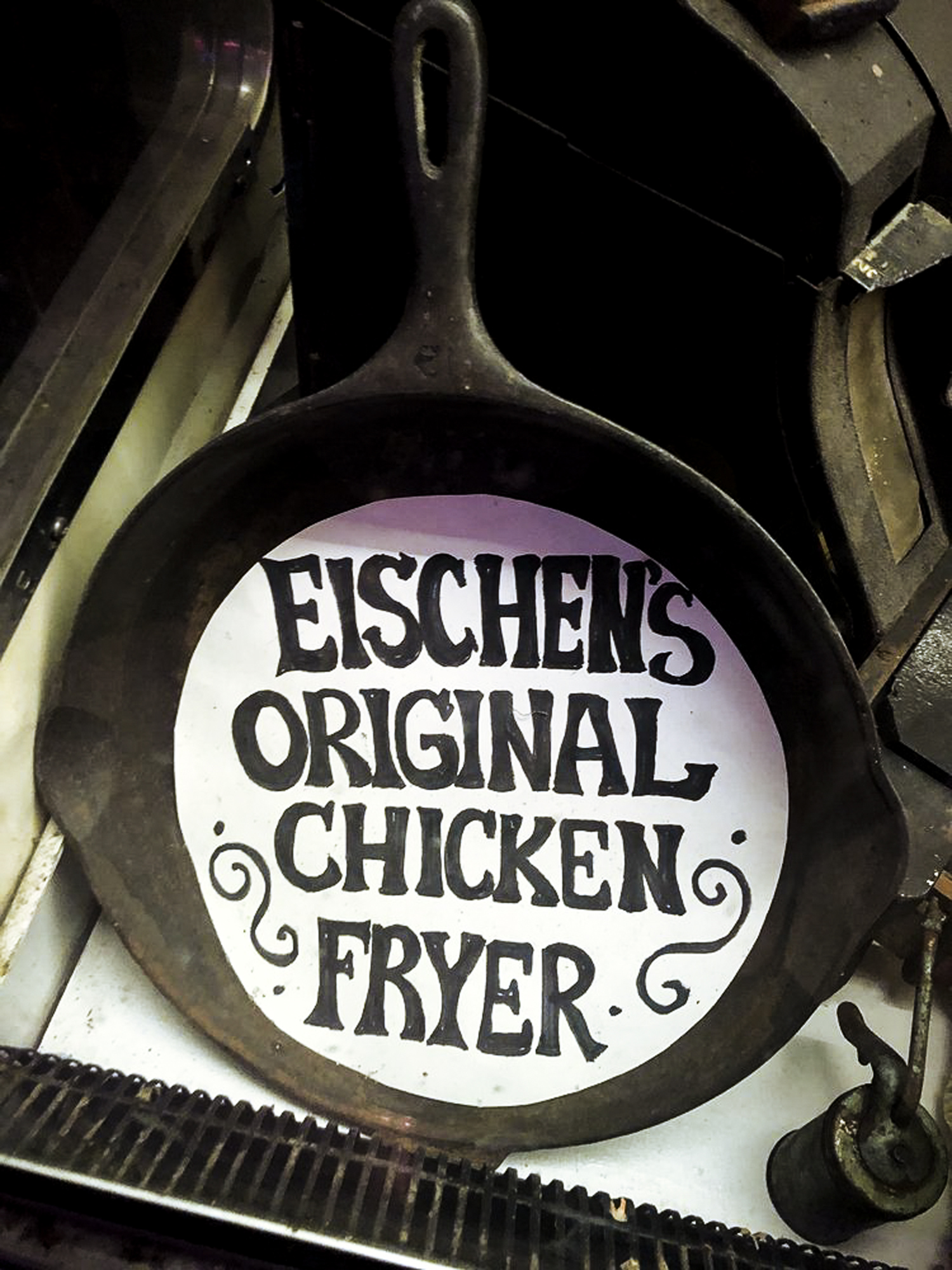
Eischen's Original Chicken Frier

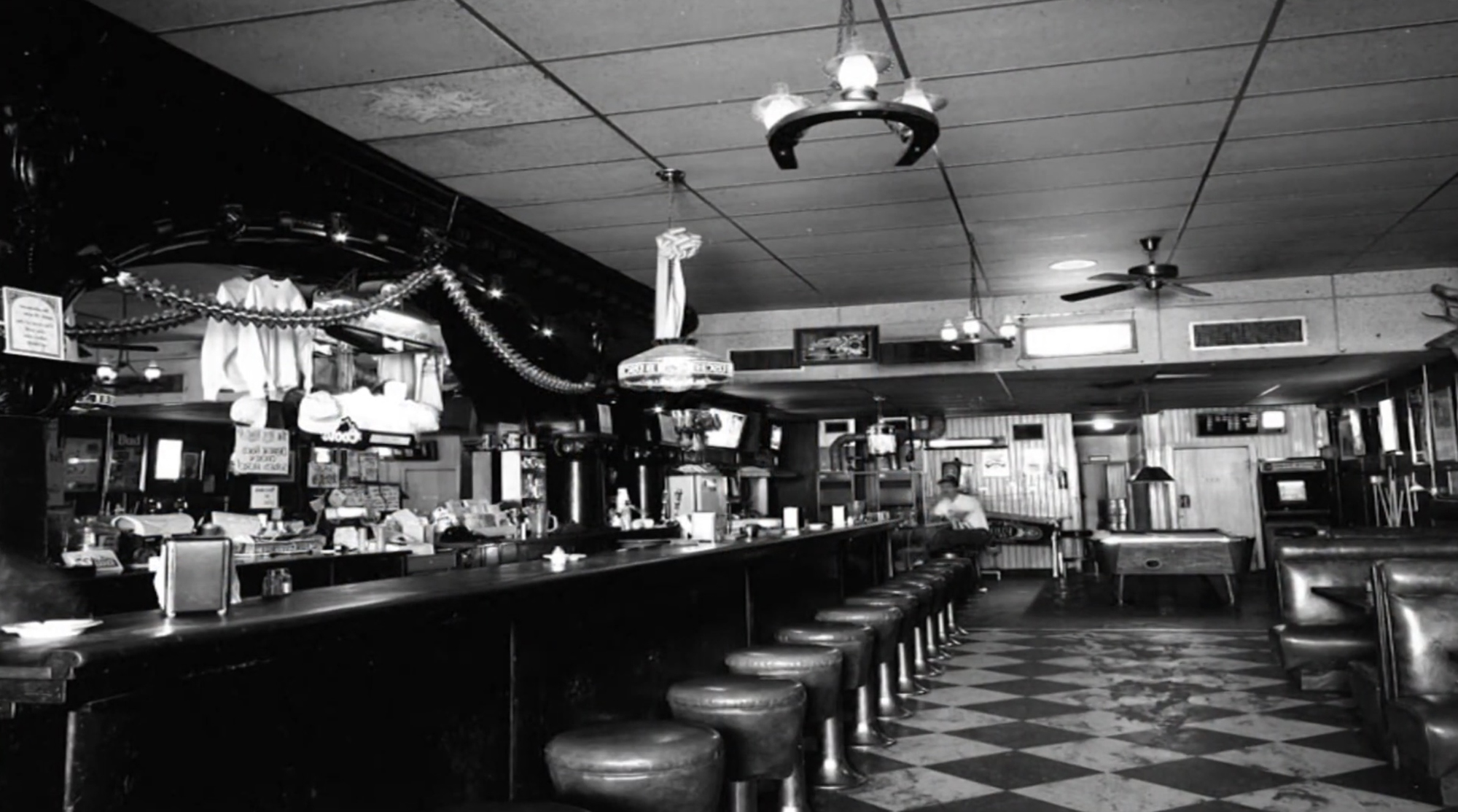
Eischen's Bar

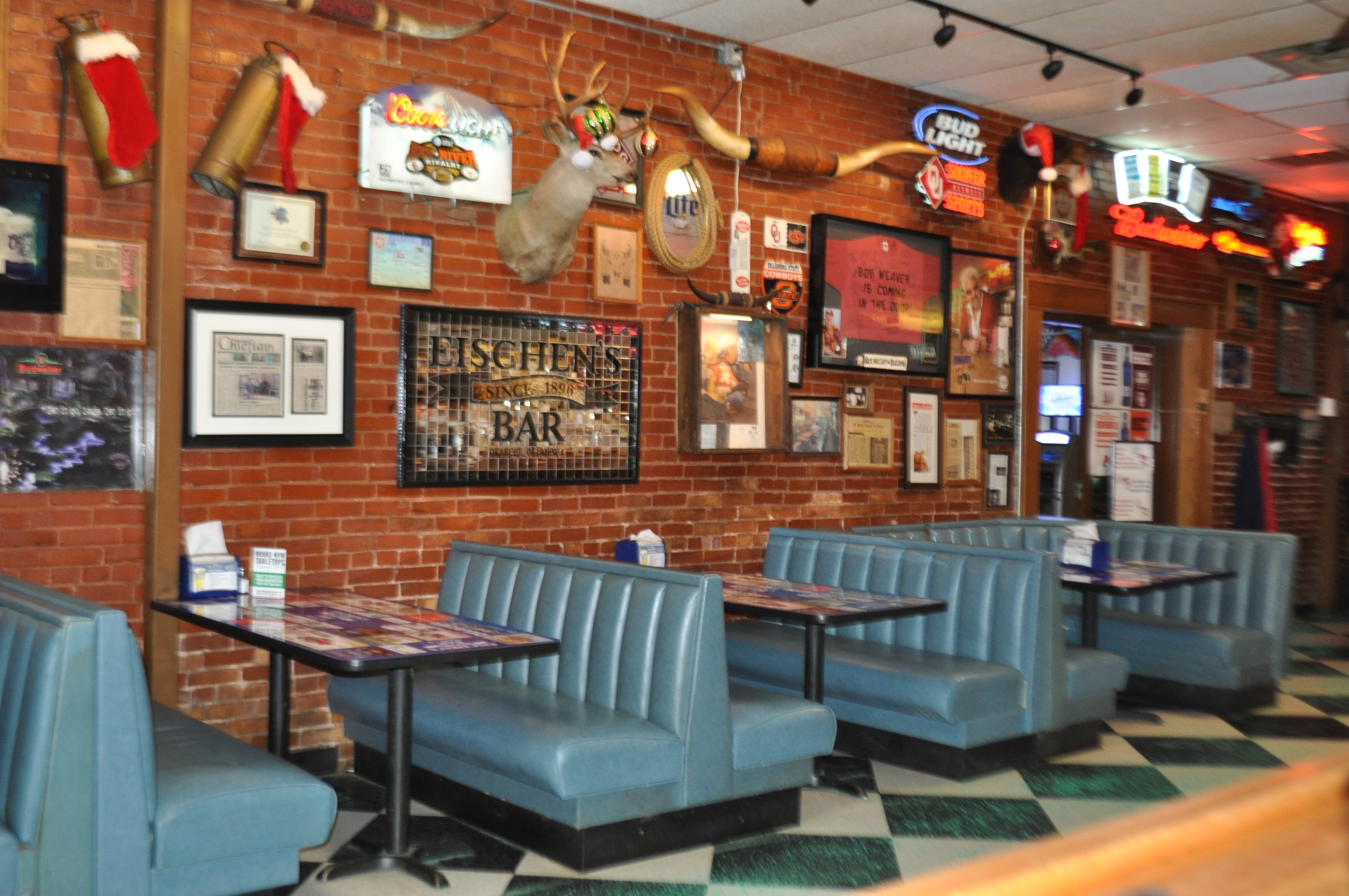
Eischen's Bar - Okarche, Oklahoma

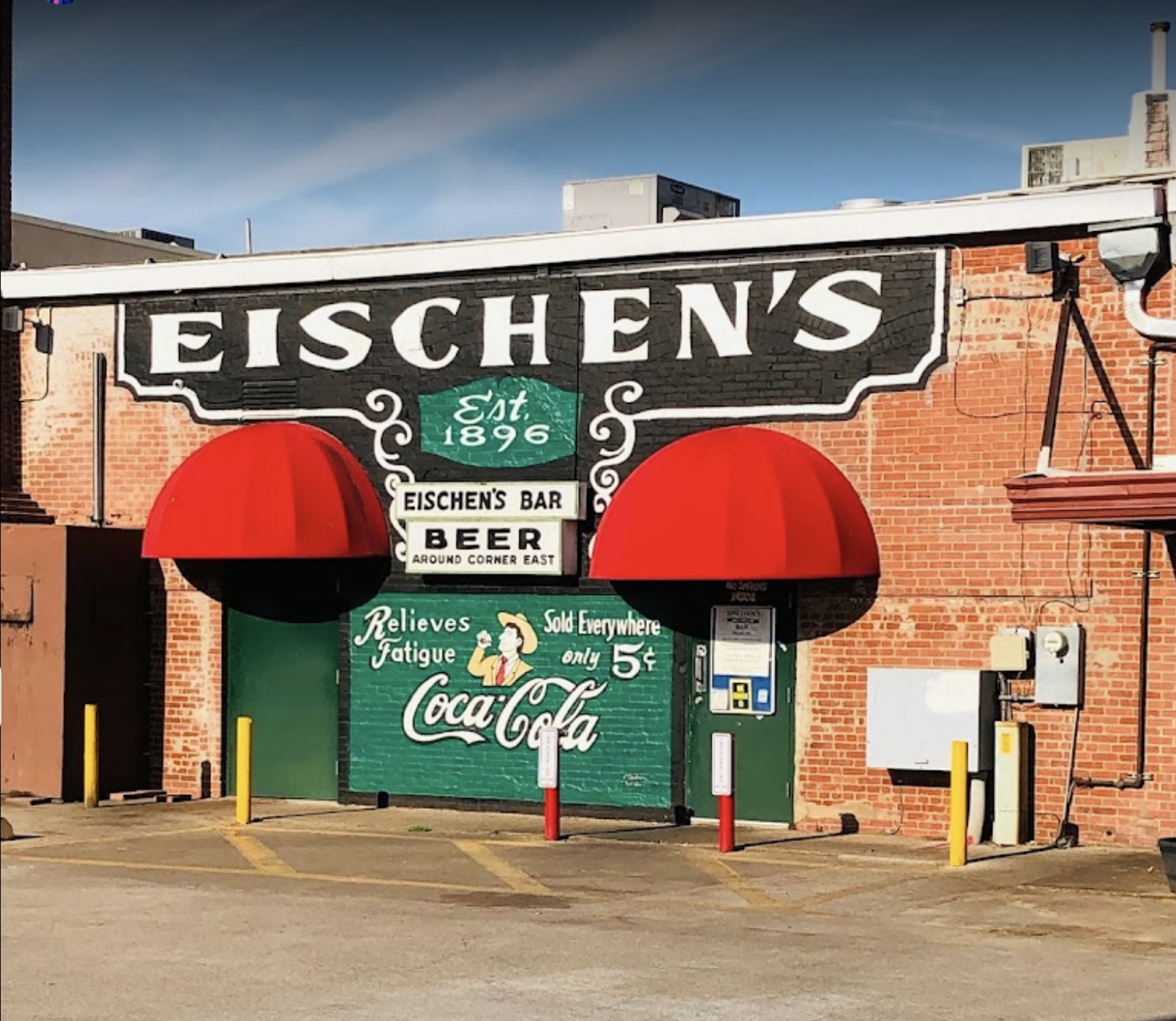
Eishen's Bar - Exterior

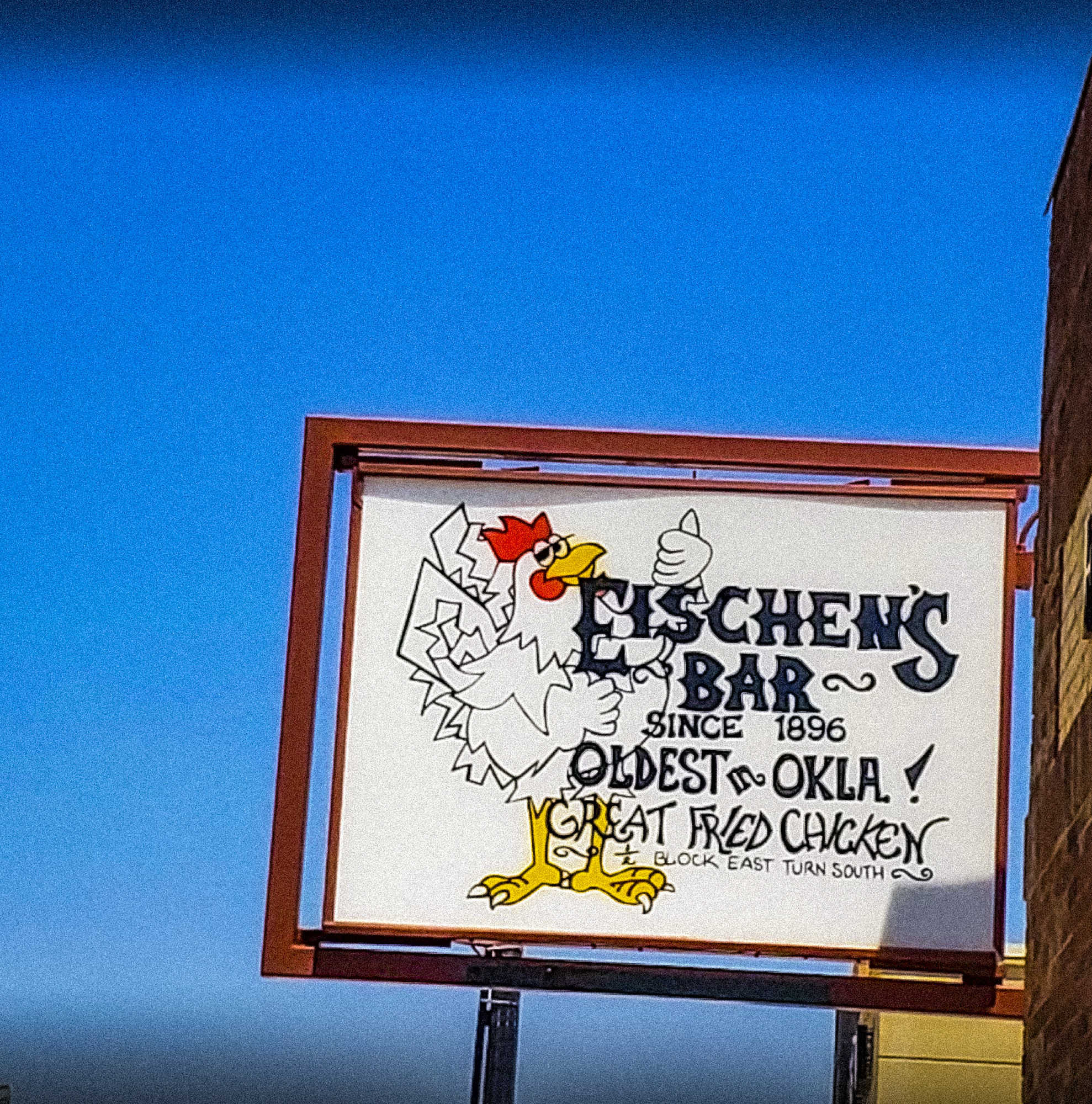
Eishen's Bar - Exterior Signage
