= Tzʼutujil language =

Mayan language spoken by the Tzʼutujil people of Guatemala

Tzutujil
- Tzʼutujiil
- Pronunciation: [tsʼutuχiːl]
- Native to: Guatemala
- Region: Western Highlands
- Ethnicity: 106,000 Tzʼutujil (2019 census)
- Native speakers: 72,000 (2019 census)
- Language family: Mayan: Quichean–Mamean; Greater Quichean; Quichean; Tzutujil
- Dialects: Eastern; Western

Official status
- Recognised minority language in: Guatemala
- Regulated by: Academia de Lenguas Mayas de Guatemala (ALMG)

Language codes
- ISO 639-3: tzj
- Glottolog: tzut1248
- ELP: Tz'utujil

Tzʼutujil (/ˈtsuːtəhiːl/) is a Mayan language spoken by the Tzʼutujil people in the region to the south of Lake Atitlán in Guatemala. Tzʼutujil is closely related to its larger neighbors, Kaqchikel and Kʼicheʼ. The 2002 census found that 60,000 people speak Tzʼutujil as their mother tongue. The two Tzʼutujil dialects are Eastern and Western.

The majority of the Tzʼutujil people speak Spanish as a second language, although many of the older people, or those who live remote areas do not speak Spanish. Many children also do not learn Spanish until they first go to school at the age of five although more importance is now being placed upon it due to the influx of tourism into the region. As of 2012, the Community Library Rijaʼtzuul Naʼooj in San Juan La Laguna features story telling for children in Tzʼutujil; bilingual children's books are also available.

== Phonology ==
In the charts below each of the Tzʼutujil phonemes is represented by the character or set of characters that denote it in the standard orthography developed by the Guatemalan Academy of Mayan Languages (ALMG) and sanctioned by the Guatemalan government. Where different, the corresponding symbol in the International Phonetic Alphabet appears in brackets.

Stress is always on the final syllable of native words, except for the adjectival vowel suffix in certain environments.

=== Vowels ===
Tzʼutujil has five short and five long vowels.

Short	Long	
i [ɪ]	ii [iː]	close front unrounded vowel
e [ɛ]	ee [eː]	mid front unrounded vowel
a [ɐ]	aa [aː]	open central unrounded vowel
o [ɔ]	oo [oː]	mid back rounded vowel
u [ʊ]	uu [uː]	close back rounded vowel

ee and oo tend to be more open ([ɛː, ɔː]) before a glottal stop.

Many words allow either a and e, and although many allow a only, there are few which require e, suggesting that /e/ is merging into /a/. A smaller number of words allow either a or o.

=== Consonants ===
Like other Mayan languages, Tzʼutujil does not distinguish voiced and voiceless stops and affricates but instead distinguishes pulmonic and glottalized stops and affricates.

		Bilabial	Alveolar		Post-alv./ Palatal	Velar	Post- velar	Glottal
Nasal		m ⟨m⟩	n ⟨n⟩					
Plosive/ Affricate	plain	p ⟨p⟩	t ⟨t⟩	ts ⟨tz⟩	tʃ ⟨ch⟩	k ⟨k⟩	q ⟨q⟩	ʔ ⟨ʼ⟩
Plosive/ Affricate	glottalized	ɓ ⟨bʼ⟩	ɗ ⟨tʼ⟩	tsʼ ⟨tzʼ⟩	tʃʼ ⟨chʼ⟩	kʼ ⟨kʼ⟩	ʛ ~ qʼ ⟨qʼ⟩	ʔ ⟨ʼ⟩
Fricative			s ⟨s⟩		ʃ ⟨x⟩		χ ⟨j⟩	
Trill			r ⟨r⟩					
Approximant		β ~ w ⟨w⟩	l ⟨l⟩		j ⟨y⟩			

The glottalized stop kʼ and affricates chʼ, tzʼ are ejective, while bʼ, tʼ are voiced implosives before vowels, and ejectives ([pʼ], [tʼ]) elsewhere (before consonants and at the ends of words). Qʼ may be either ejective or implosive before vowels, ejective elsewhere.

The pulmonic stops and affricates, p, t, tz, ch, k, q, are tenuis before vowels and aspirated elsewhere.

Velar k, kʼ are palatalized before i, and also usually before a non-back vowel (i, e, a) followed by a post-velar (q, qʼ, j), though the latter dissimilation is not completely productive.

W is [β] before front vowels (i, e) and [w] before non-front vowels (a, o, u).

J is a post-velar [x] in most positions, but [h] before two consonants or a word-final consonant.

At the beginning of a morpheme, there is no distinction between glottal stop and zero: Monosyllabic forms always have a glottal stop, with the exception of a few grammatical forms which never do, and when prefixed the glottal stop is retained. With polysyllabic forms the glottal stop is optional, and when prefixed it is not retained. Usually initial glottal stops are invisible to the morphology, but in some words they are treated as consonants.

Liquids and approximants, r, l, w, y, are devoiced word-finally and before consonants, even before voiced consonants as in elnaq [ɛl̥náq]. The nasals, m, n, are partially devoiced word-finally; they start off voiced and end up voiceless.

== Sample words and phrases ==
- maltyoox or mal diox – 'thank-you'
- menuc xuben – 'you're welcome' (also said after finishing every meal)
- saqari – 'good morning'
- xqaʼj qʼiij – 'good afternoon'
- xok aaqʼaʼ – 'good night'
- naʼan – 'good-bye'
- joʼ – 'let's go!'
- utz aawach – 'how are you?'
- jeeʼ – 'yes'
- maniʼ or majon – 'no'
