= Cathedral of Guatemala City =

Metropolitan cathedral in Guatemala City

Coordinates: 14.6417°N 90.5120°W

Holy Church Cathedral Metropolitan Basilica of Santiago de Guatemala -Catedral Primada Metropolitana de Santiago de Guatemala
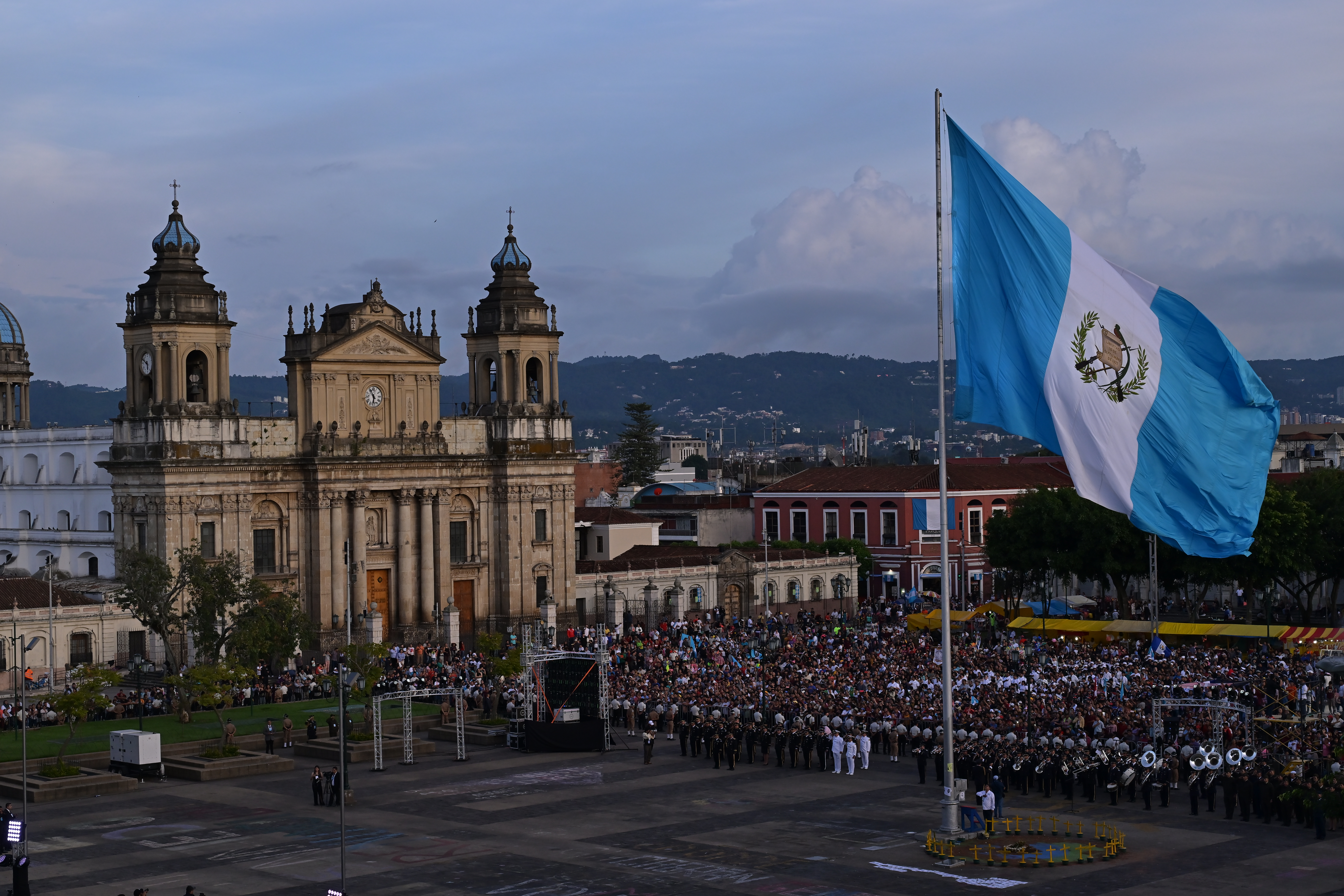
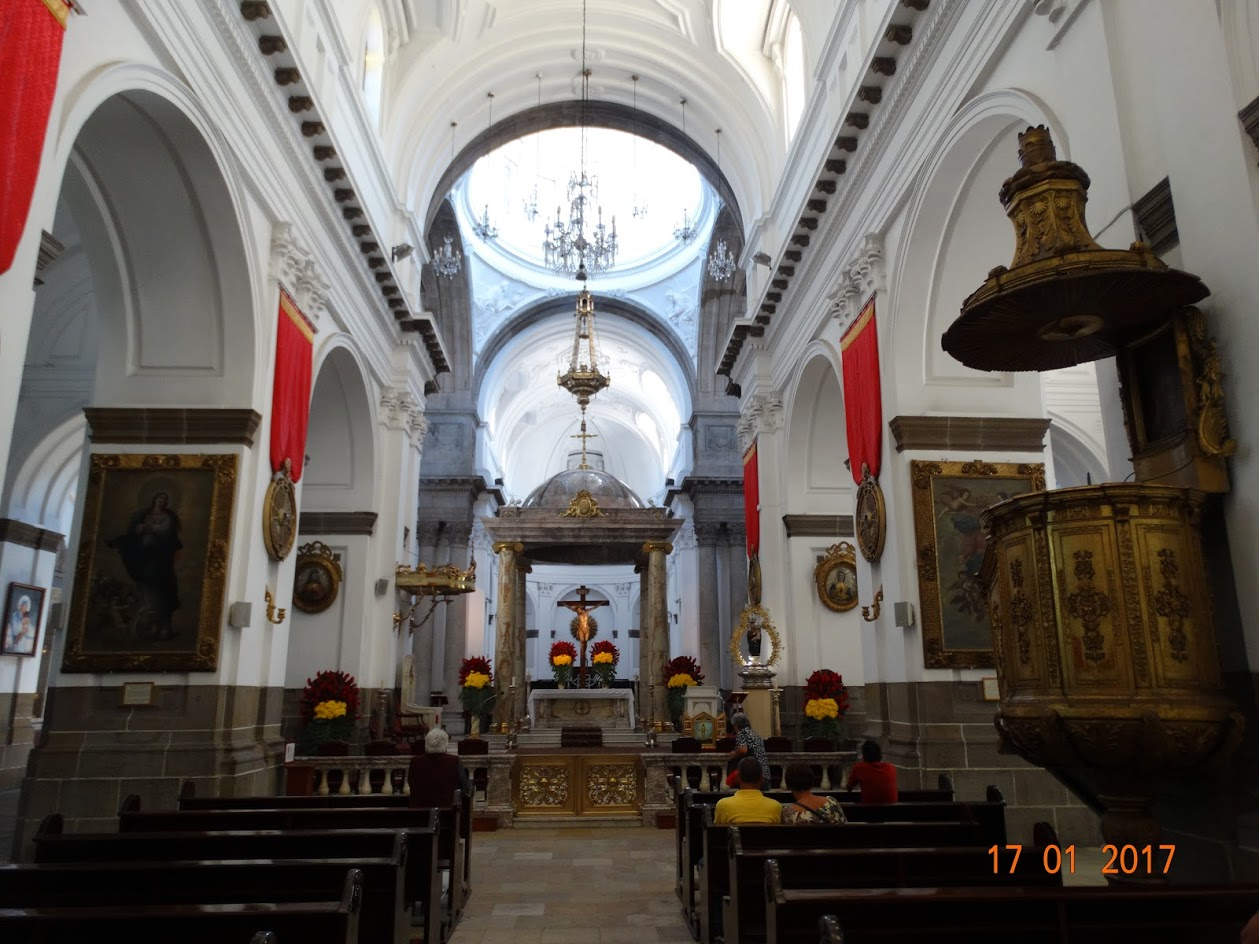
- View of the exterior of the Metropolitan Cathedral View inside the Metropolitan Cathedral

Religion
- Affiliation: Roman Catholic
- Ecclesiastical or organisational status: Cathedral
- Year consecrated: 25 March 1815
- Status: Active

Location
- Location: Guatemala City, Guatemala
- Interactive map of Holy Church Cathedral Metropolitan Basilica of Santiago de Guatemala -Catedral Primada Metropolitana de Santiago de Guatemala

Architecture
- Type: Church
- Style: Neoclassic
- Groundbreaking: 1782
- Completed: 1871

Specifications
- Direction of façade: West
- Dome: 1
- Materials: Stone

The Holy Church Cathedral Metropolitan Basilica of Santiago de Guatemala also Metropolitan Cathedral, officially Catedral Primada Metropolitana de Santiago, is the main church of Guatemala City and of the Archdiocese of Guatemala (Archidioecesis Guatimalensis). It is located at the Parque Central in the center of the city. Its massive structure incorporates baroque and classical elements and has withstood numerous earthquakes. Damage by the devastating earthquakes of 1917 and 1976 has been repaired. The inside of the cathedral is relatively sparsely decorated but impresses by its size and its structural strength. The altars are ornate and decorative. In front of the cathedral stand a series of 12 pillars, solemnly remembering the names of thousands of people forcibly disappeared or murdered during the counterinsurgency violence of Guatemala's internal armed conflict, which began in 1960 and lasted until the final peace accord was signed in 1996.

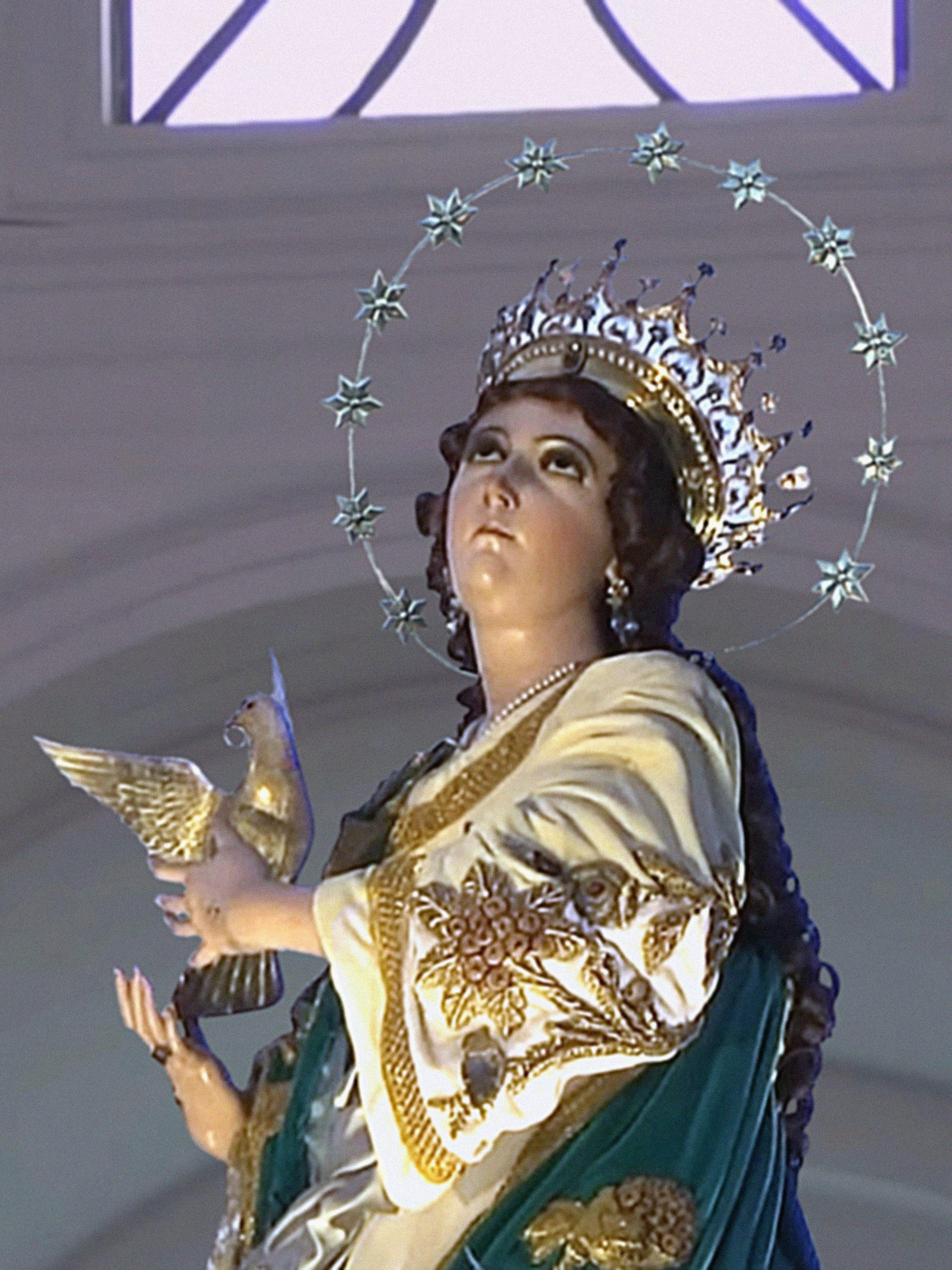
The venerated image of the Immaculate Conception in the cathedral, crowned on 5 December 2004.

On 28 October 2003, Pope John Paul II authorized the canonical coronation of the Immaculate Conception enshrined within the cathedral which occurred on 5 December 2004. The papal bull was signed and executed by Cardinal Francis Arinze, prefect of the Sacred Congregation of Divine Worship and the Discipline of the Sacraments.

== History ==
=== Move of Guatemala City to a new location ===
After the Santa Marta Earthquakes of 1773 that destroyed Santiago de los Caballeros de Guatemala, there was a large argument between Spanish and clerical authorities on whether to move the city to a new location . Against strong opposition of archbishop Pedro Cortés y Larraz, Captain General Martin de Mayorga decided to impose the move to its new location in the Ermita Valley; Cortés y Larraz was afraid that with the move the church had to begin from scratch and would lose part, if not all, of its power and influence. The cathedral moved to the new capital on 22 November 1779, but all the interior ornaments that had not been destroyed by the earthquake in the old building remained behind in what was now called Antigua Guatemala; in 1783 they were taken away from the frail ruins and stored in the old Universidad de San Carlos Borromeo building and in the El Sagrario Parish warehouse, which was also open the public in a section of the old cathedral.

Initially, the cathedral was provisionally located in a small chapel, but this was damaged very quickly, forcing the authorities to move to the Santa Rosa Chapel in 1786, where it remained until it moved to its definitive location in 1815.

=== Temple construction ===
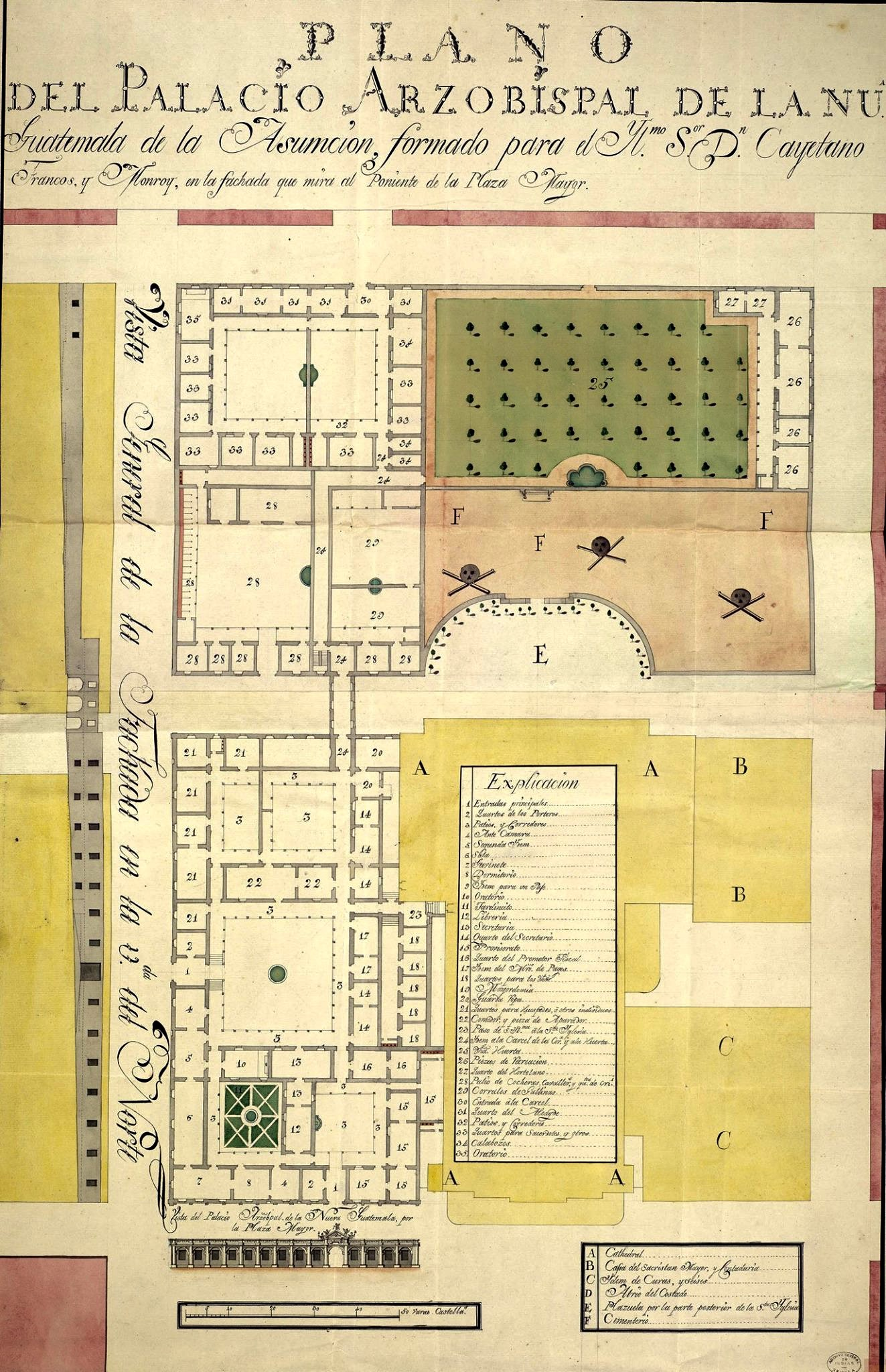
Archbishop palace blueprint from 1779, presented to bishop Cayetano Francos y Monroy for approval.

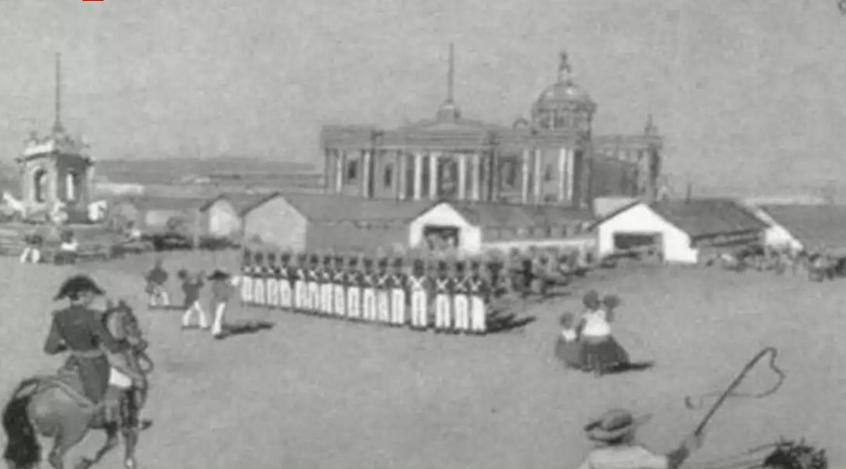
Cathedral of James in Guatemala City in the 1850s. The large sticks coming out of the bell towers and the fountain were the first lightning rods ever used in Guatemala.

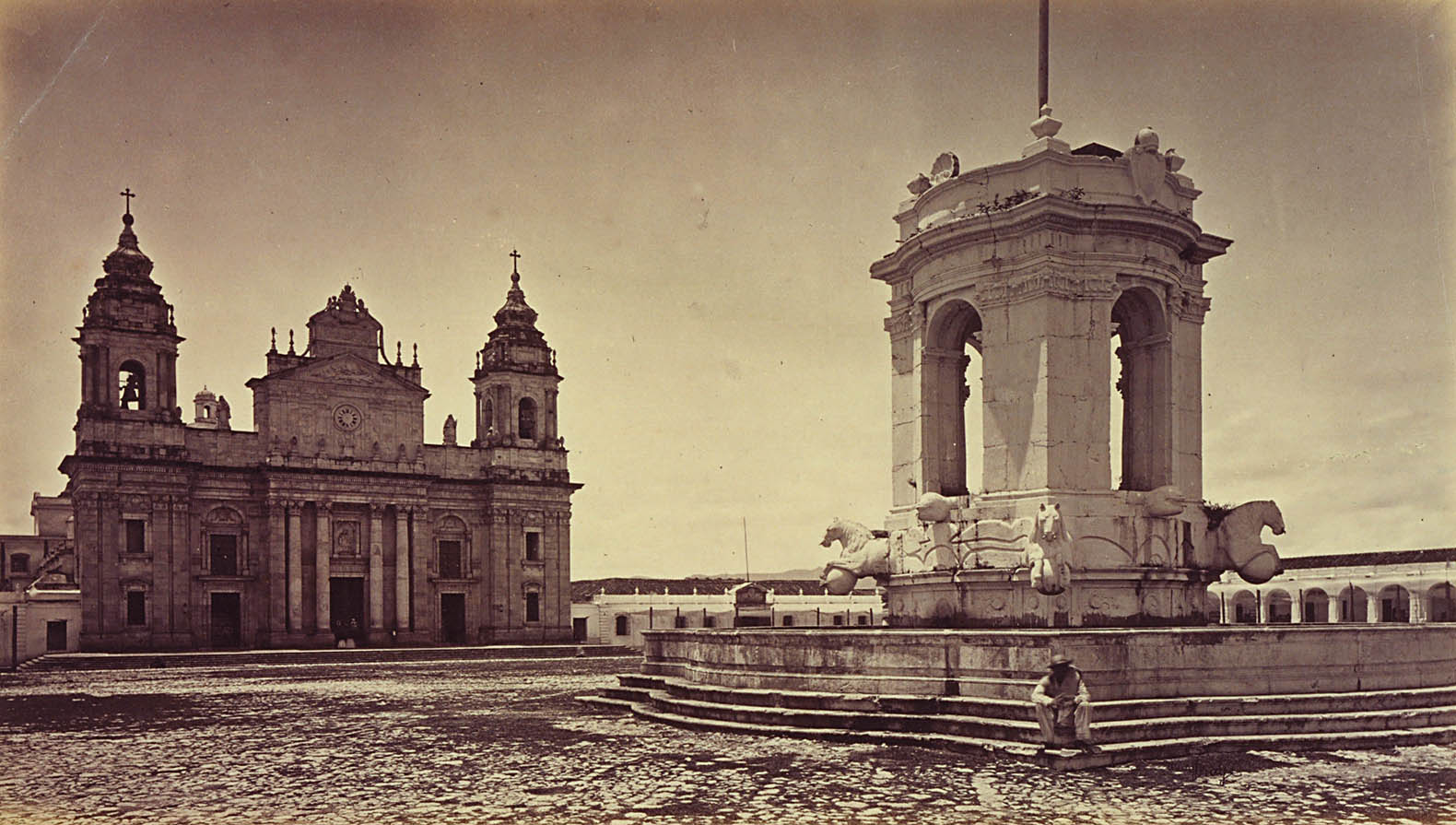
Carlos III fountain and St. James Cathedral in Guatemala City in 1875. Photograph by Eadweard Muybridge.

It did not take long for the authorities to replace rebel archbishop Cortés y Larraz, who left in favor of Cayetano Francos y Monroy, who arrived in late 1779 and took over the building projects of the religious settlements in the new city. Architect Marco Ibáñez; artist Antonio Bernasconi – who arrived from Spain in July 1777; and engineer Joaquín de Isasi were in charge of the blueprints for the new cathedral and after two years got them approved by Royal Decree of 6 November 1779, which arrived in Guatemala in February 1780. Francos y Monroy, gave his blessing to the new location and placed the first stone of the cathedral in 1782.

Work began officially on 13 August 1783 and lasted until 1815, when the sculpture of Our Lay of Perpetual Help was transported in procession from Santa Rosa and was placed in the main altar of its new chapel in the cathedral, where it has remained since then. Most of the main section of the church was completed by 1815, and the new organ was installed, along with numerous other sculptors that were moved in a lengthy procession. The church was officially opened with a Te Deum.

In 1816, the gold from the old altars was removed and then used to create the new ones and in 1821 began construction of the two east side towers, which were the minor bell towers that faced the city cemetery which was east of the cathedral in those days. In 1826 east, south and west doors were installed, as well as the frames for the windows in the subterranean crypts.

On 23 July 1860, a new altar made of Carrara marble was put in place of the old wooden altar, which was moved to Santa Rosa chapel.

The towers were completed in 1867 and the bronze from the San José Fort cannons was used to build the main bell, which was blessed during the first Vatican Council in 1871, and which became known as "La Chepona" since then.

=== 1917–1918 Guatemala earthquakes ===
In 1917 a series of tremors began on 17 November and destroyed several towns near Amatitlán. But on 25 and 29 December, and on 3 and 4 January 1918, there were strong earthquakes, which destroyed numerous public buildings and private homes in Guatemala City. Semi-official Diario de Centro América, published updates twice a day for several days and then began criticizing the slow and inefficient government response.

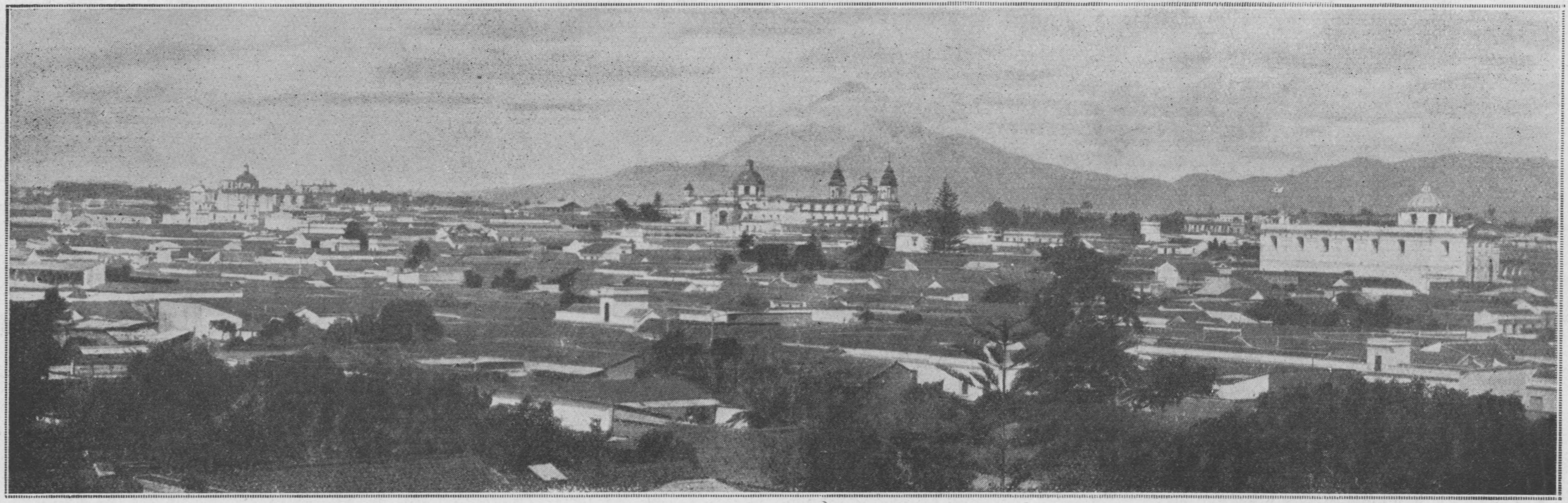
Partial view of Guatemala City before the 1917–1918 earthquakes. Photographs from French Magazine L'Illustration on 12 January 1918.

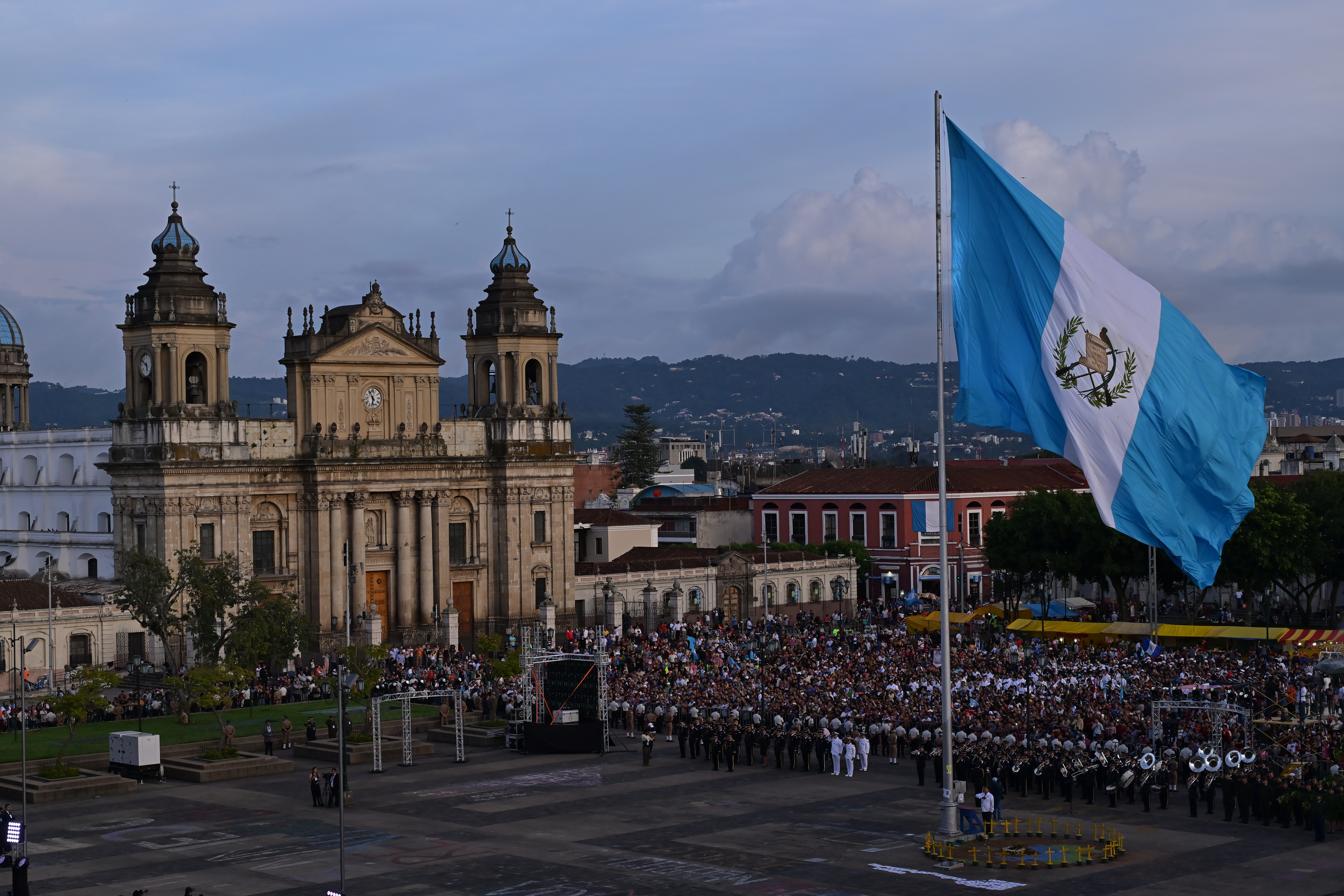
The Metropolitan Cathedral in 2023.

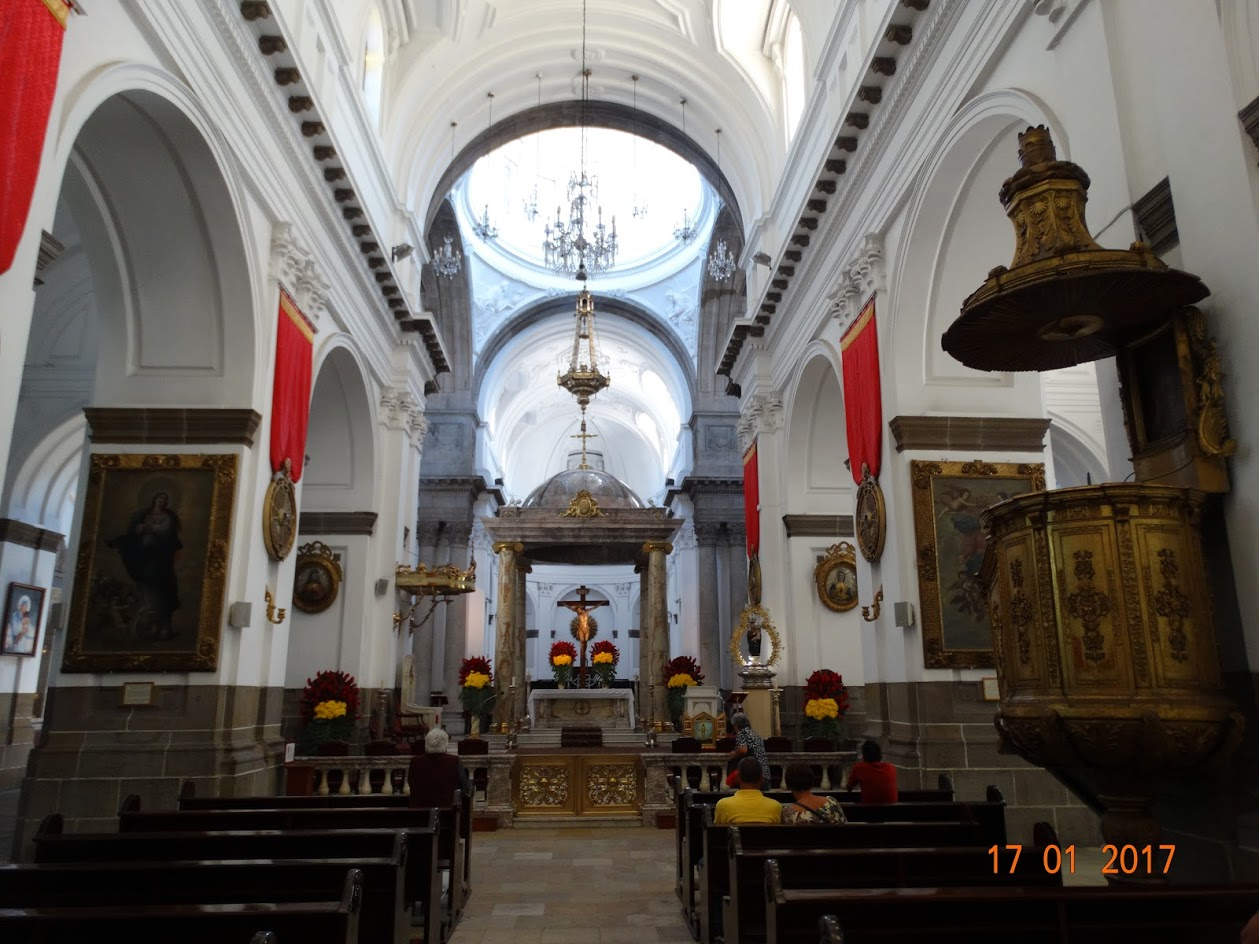
Altar of the Cathedral

=== 1976 Guatemala earthquake ===
On 4 February 1976, at 03:01:43 AM (09:01:43 UTC), a magnitude 7.5 earthquake occurred close to Los Amates, in Izabal Department, 160 km northeast of Guatemala City. It destroyed large portions of Guatemala. Thousands of homes and buildings collapsed, including the cathedral. The very large earthquake was also felt in Belize, El Salvador, Honduras and Mexico, where it was felt in Mexico City. Approximately twenty-three thousand people died, seventy-six thousand were wounded, and more than a million were displaced. There were also numerous aftershocks. However, contrary to the inept response of president Manuel Estrada Cabrera in 1917, president general Kjell Eugenio Laugerud Garcia organized an efficient recovery; as part of that plan, the cathedral was completely repaired within the next five years.

== In film ==
Sections of the cathedral are shown in the Mexican-Guatemalan film Sólo de noche vienes which was produced by Panamerican Films and Guatemalan producer Manuel Zeceña Diéguez and directed by Sergio Véjar. It starred Elsa Aguirre and Julio Alemán along Cosmo Alessio, Rodolfo Landa, Herbert Meneses and Regina Torné. The plot is about a forbidden romance that takes place during Holy Week in a city in Central America. In the 21st century Sólo de noche vienes is also an important film documentary of the Holy Week processions in Guatemala of the 1960s.

== See also ==
- Antigua Guatemala Cathedral
- List of places in Guatemala

== Notes and references ==
=== Bibliography ===
- Barillas, Edgar (2013). "50 películas filmadas en Guatemala y una que no (1935–1996). Apuntes para una cartografía de los lugares filmados en Guatemala". Revista Historia de la Universidad de San Carlos de Guatemala (in Spanish). Guatemala. Archived from the original on October 22, 2015.
- Belaubre, Christophe (2013). "Francos y Monroy, Cayetano: Aspectos de la vida del arzobispo de Guatemala que vinó para retomar el control de un clero guatemalteco en estado de rebelión casi abierto" (in Spanish). Archived from the original on 2017-07-22.
- Compagnie Belge de Colonisation (1844). "Colonisation du district de Santo-Thomas de Guatemala par la Communauté de l'Union". Collection de renseignements publiés ou recueillis par la Compagnie (in French). Original held and digitised by the British Library.
- Conkling, Alfred R. (1884). "Appleton's guide to Mexico, including a chapter on Guatemala, and a complete English-Spanish vocabulary". Nueva York: D. Appleton and Company.
- Diario de Centro América (1918). "Cobertura del cataclismo". Diario de Centro América (in Spanish). Guatemala: Tipografía La Unión.
- Guatemala de Ayer (2011). "Catedral Metropolitana". Blog de Guatemala de Ayer (in Spanish).
- IDESAC (1976). "Terremoto. Diagnóstico preliminar". Instituto para el Desarrollo Económico y Social de América Central (in Spanish). IDESAC: 22–25.
- Melchor Toledo, Johann Estuardo (2011). "El arte religioso de la Antigua Guatemala, 1773–1821; crónica de la emigración de sus imágenes" (PDF). Tesis doctoral en Historia del Arte (in Spanish). Mexico City: National Autonomous University of Mexico.
- Olcese, Orlando; Moreno, Ramón; Ibarra, Francisco (1977). "The Guatemala Earthquake Disaster of 1976: A Review of its Effects and of the contribution of the United Nations family" (PDF). Guatemala: UNDP. Archived from the original (PDF) on 24 July 2011.
- Santos, Israel (18 June 2015). "De cuando Cristo Rey, La Merced y El Calvario llegaron a la pantalla grande". Cucurhco en Guatemala (in Spanish). Guatemala. Archived from the original on 19 June 2015.
- Rosales Flores, Martín Haroldo (2015). "Fotos antiguas de la Ciudad de Guatemala: Post conmemorativo". Facebook (in Spanish). Guatemala.
- Urrutia, César (2011). "Historia de la Ciudad de Guatemala: Fuerte de San José Buena Vista". Guatemala de Ayer. Guatemala. Archived from the original on 24 December 2014.
- USGS (1976). "Guatemalan Quake Culprit Fault Identified". Earthquake Information Bulletin. 8 (3). USGS.
