= List of cathedrals in Guatemala =

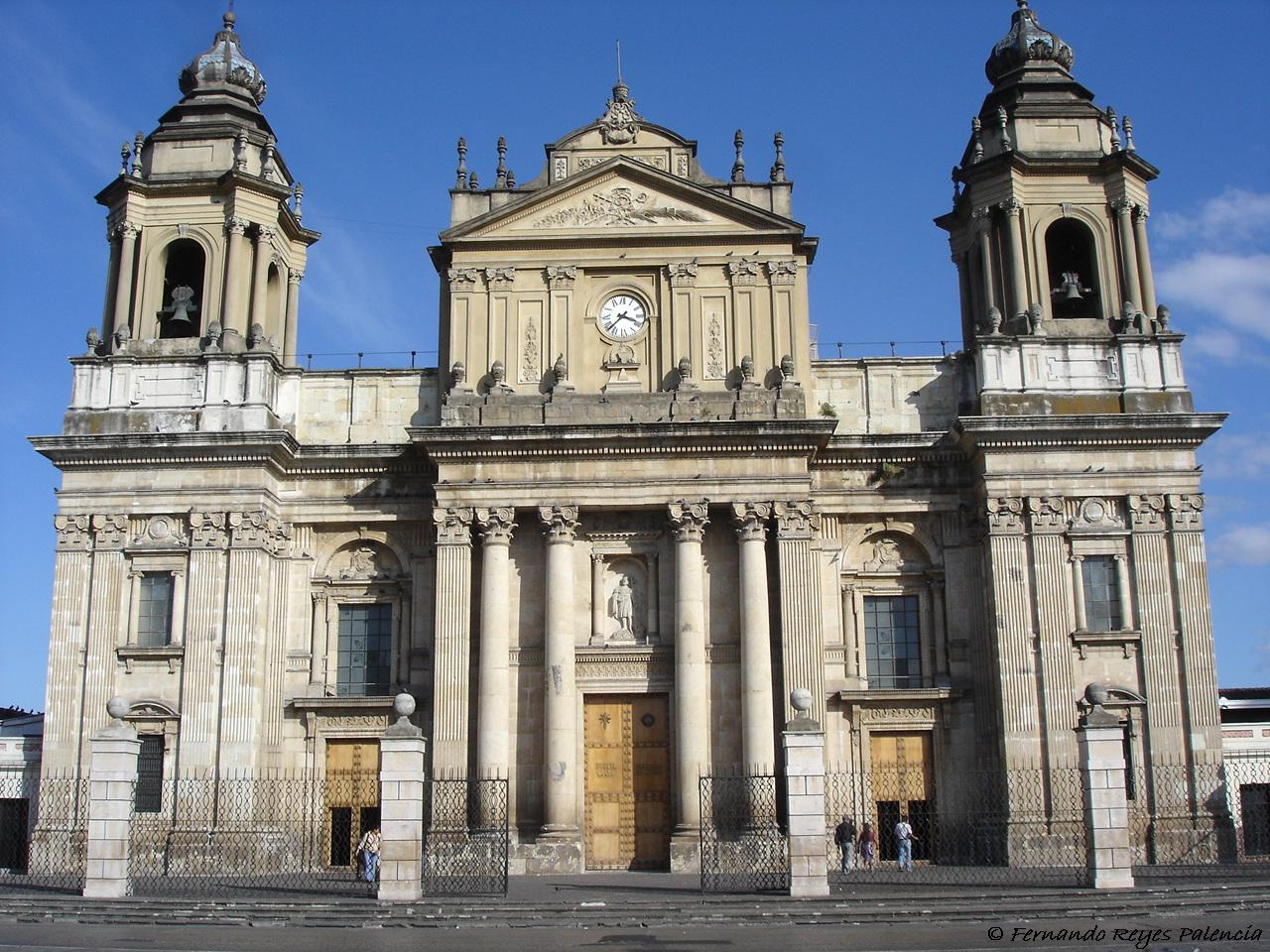
Primatial Metropolitan Cathedral of St. James in Guatemala City

This is the list of cathedrals in Guatemala sorted by denomination.

Location of cathedrals in Guatemala
Roman Catholic
Anglican

== Catholic ==
Cathedrals of the Catholic Church in Guatemala:

1. Catedral Nuestra Señora de Los Remedios y San Pablo Itzá in Flores
2. Cathedral of Our Lady of the Conception in Escuintla
3. Primatial Metropolitan Cathedral of St. James in Guatemala City
4. Cathedral of Our Lady of the Immaculate Conception in Huehuetenango
5. Catedral Inmaculada Concepción de María in Puerto Barrios
6. Cathedral of Our Lady of Hope in Jalapa
7. Cathedral of the Holy Spirit in Quetzaltenango
8. Co-Cathedral of St. Michael the Archangel in Totonicapán
9. Cathedral of the Holy Cross in Santa Cruz del Quiché
10. Cathedral of St. Mark in San Marcos
11. Catedral del Niño Dios de Cuilapa in Santa Rosa de Lima
12. Basílica del Cristo Negro de Esquipulas in Esquipulas
13. Cathedral of Our Lady of the Assumption in Sololá Department
14. Co-Cathedral of St. Ann in Chimaltenango
15. Cathedral of St. Bartholomew in Suchitepéquez Department
16. Cathedral of St. Dominic in Cobán
17. Cathedral of St. Peter in Zacapa

== Anglican ==
Cathedrals of the Anglican Church in Central America:

- Cathedral of St James the Apostle in Guatemala City

== See also ==
- Lists of cathedrals
