= Alma llanera (film) =

1965 film

- Directed by: Gilberto Martínez Solares
- Screenplay by: Gilberto Martínez Solares; Alfredo Ruanova; Carlos E. Taboada
- Story by: Alfredo Ruanova; Carlos E. Taboada
- Produced by: Manuel Zeceña Diéguez
- Starring: Antonio Aguilar; Flor Silvestre; Manuel Capetillo
- Cinematography: Agustín Martínez Solares
- Edited by: Carlos Savage
- Music by: Raúl Lavista
- Production company: Panamerican Films S.A.
- Distributed by: Azteca Films Inc.
- Release date: 29 October 1965 (Mexico)
- Country: Mexico
- Language: Spanish

Alma llanera (English: "Soul of the Plains") is a 1965 Mexican Western drama film, written and directed by Gilberto Martínez Solares, and starring Antonio Aguilar, Flor Silvestre and Manuel Capetillo. It features Aguilar portraying his characteristic ranchero film hero.

== Plot ==
Two childhood friends, Juan Pablo (Antonio Aguilar) and Ramiro (Manuel Capetillo) meet again, but when a difficult situation arises, the friends are slowly turned into rivals. Complicating matters is Juan Pablo's love for Lucía (Flor Silvestre).

== Cast ==
- Antonio Aguilar as Juan Pablo Ureña
- Flor Silvestre as Lucía
- Manuel Capetillo as Ramiro Leyva
- Manuel Dondé as El tuerto
- Juan José Laboriel as Zampayo
- Augusto Monterroso as Doctor Ramos
- Claudio Lanuza (as Claudio Lanusa)

== Reception ==
La guía del cine mexicano de la pantalla grande a la televisión, 1919–1984 states about the film: "The film tries to reproduce a climate similar to that of Doña Bárbara. Unfortunately, the beautiful and famous Venezuelan song that gives its title to Alma llanera is wasted."
