= Holy Cross Cathedral, Santa Cruz del Quiché =

Holy Cross Cathedral
- Catedral de la Santa Cruz del Quiché
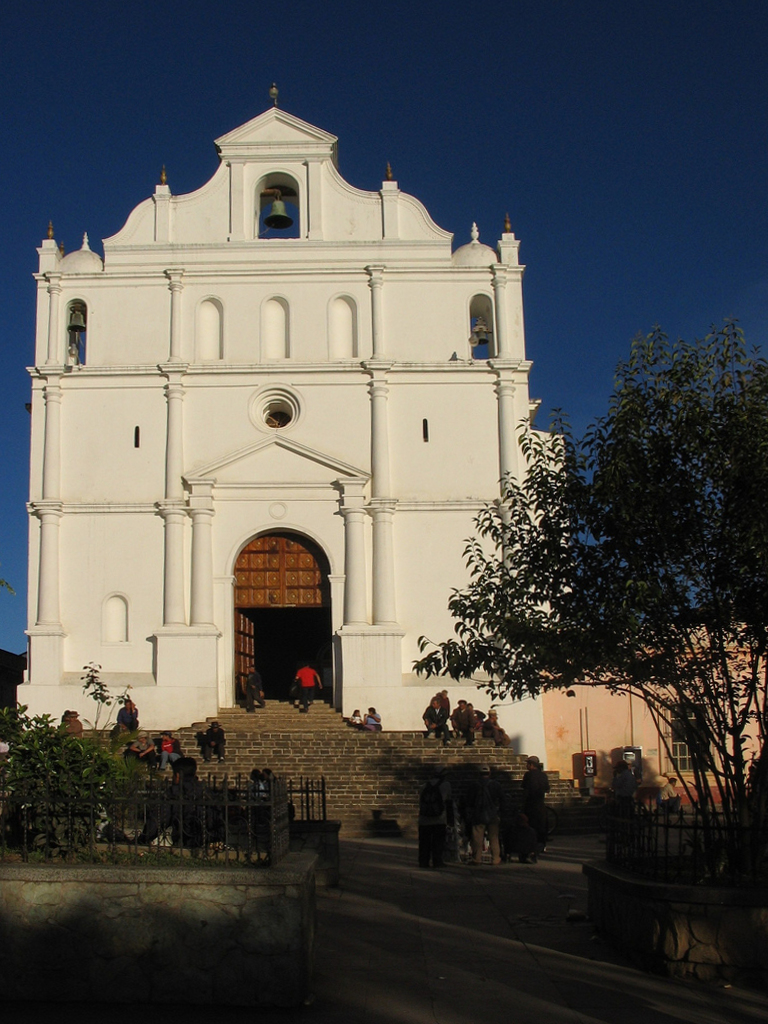
- Holy Cross Cathedral
- Location: Santa Cruz del Quiché
- Country: Guatemala
- Denomination: Roman Catholic Church

Administration
- Diocese: Roman Catholic Diocese of Quiché

The Holy Cross Cathedral (Spanish: Catedral de la Santa Cruz del Quiché ) also called Santa Cruz del Quiché Cathedral is a religious building that is located in the town of Santa Cruz del Quiché, in the Department of Quiché in the west of the Central American country of Guatemala.

The present cathedral is an ancient structure dating from 1768. The cathedral follows the Roman or Latin rite and serves as the seat of the Diocese of Quiché (Dioecesis Quicensis) which was created in 1967 by Pope Paul VI by bull "Qui Christi" .

It is under the pastoral responsibility of the Bishop Rosolino Bianchetti Boffelli.

During the Catholic feast of Easter, the processions of the faithful dedicated to the Lord Buried and the Virgin of Sorrows (Virgen de los Dolores) are made.

== See also ==
- Roman Catholicism in Guatemala
- Holy Cross Church
- List of cathedrals in Guatemala

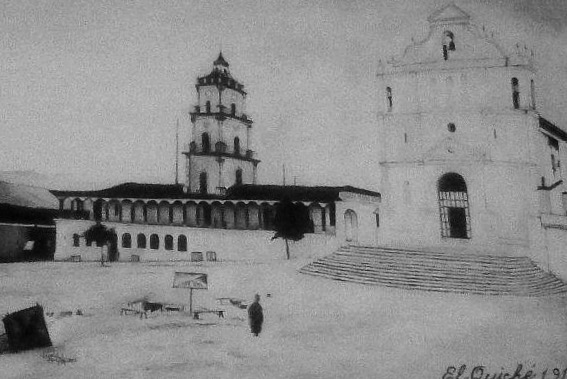
The Church in 1910
