= Sólo de noche vienes =

- You only come at night
- Directed by: Sergio Véjar
- Screenplay by: Elena Garro (Note: Elena Garro was a well known Mexican writer who was married to Literature Nobel Prize winner Octavio Paz.)
- Based on: Original work by Elena Garro written specifically for the movie.
- Produced by: Manuel Zeceña
- Starring: Julio Alemán; Elsa Aguirre; Regina Torné; Rodolfo Landa; Herbert Meneses
- Music by: Charles Trenet, Los Hermanos Cárcamo
- Production company: Panamerican Films
- Release date: 1965
- Running time: 95 minutes
- Country: Mexico
- Language: Spanish

Sólo de noche Vienes is a Mexican film produced by Panamerican Films and Guatemalan producer Manuel Zeceña Diéguez and directed by Sergio Véjar. It starred Elsa Aguirre and Julio Alemán alongside Cosmo Alessio, Rodolfo Landa, Herbert Meneses and Regina Torné. The plot is about a forbidden romance that takes place during Holy Week in a city in Central America. Sólo de noche vienes is also an important documentary of the Holy Week processions in Guatemala of the 1960s.

== Plot ==
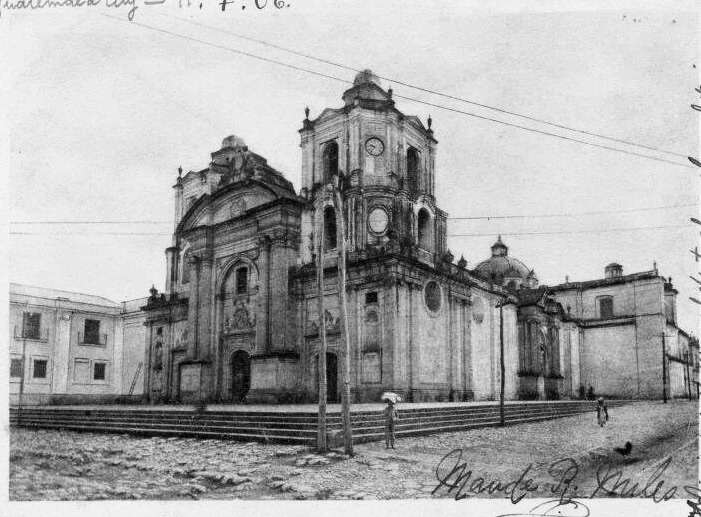
La Merced Church in Guatemala City in the early 20th century. The church was used to film the scenes when Andrés and Remedios met again but Remedios hides from Andrés to participate in the procession.

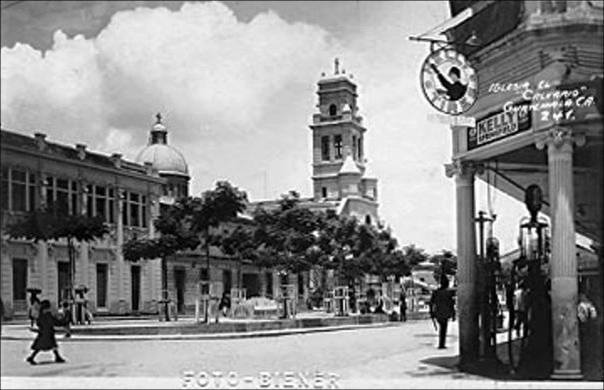
El Calvario Church in Guatemala City. The scene of the Good Friday procession was filmed at this location.

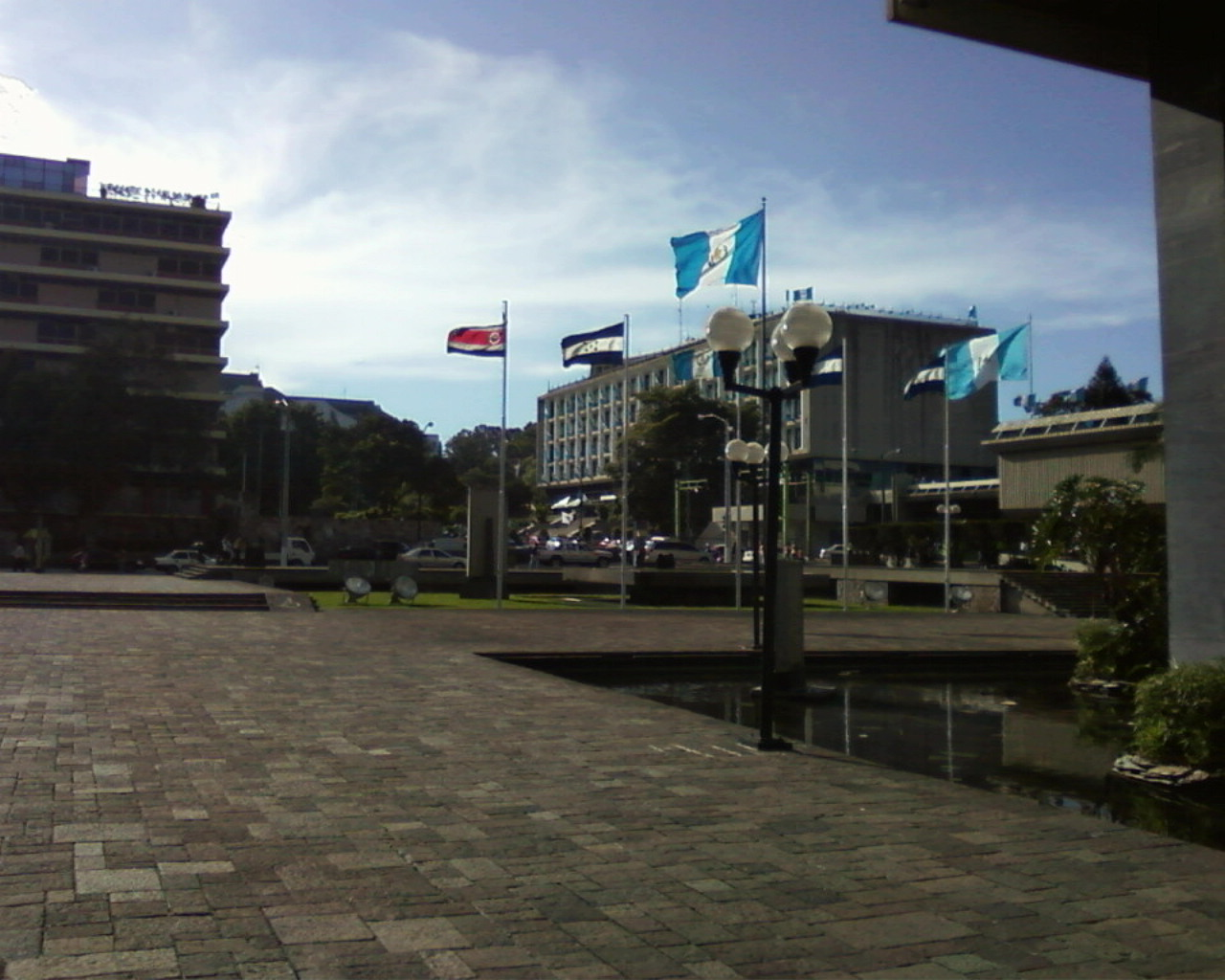
Guatemala City Civic Center in 2010. The scene of Remedios and Andrés fleeing the city in his fancy sports car after the Good Friday procession was filmed at this location.

Andrés Villalta is a Mexican tourist visiting a city in Central America to enjoy the Holy Week processions. He meets Remedios, a local socialite married to one of the most powerful men in the country, with whom he has an instant spark. Carmen, Remedios' sister-in-law appears and Remedios hides from her without giving an explanation to Andrés. When Andrés takes her home in his fancy sports car, Remedios lies to him, telling him that her name is Carmen and neglecting to mention she is married. Confusion ensues, making Remedios seem even more mysterious to Andrés.

During the film's climax, the whole family gathers to watch the Virgin Mary's silent procession. When Andrés sees Remedios and tries to reach for her, Remedios' husband's associates kill him on the spot. Andrés dies in Remedios' arms, still calling her Carmen.

The movie was directed by Sergio Véjar, and is based on a screenplay written specifically for the movie by the Mexican writer Elena Garro. Garro, producer Manuel Zeceña, and Véjar all worked on the final version of the screenplay. The plot shows the impossible love between a Mexican tourist and a mysterious woman who appears and vanishes as if she were a spirit or from another dimension; Guatemala during Holy Week is the perfect setting for the mysterious romance. The elusive woman was actually married to a powerful character, who upon discovering her liaison orders the killing of her lover during a procession. The climactic scene shows the infinity of the horizon, the rigidity of the religious and the volatility of love. Since the plot was originally written for the movie it was not included among Garro's literary works.

== Filming ==
The film was filmed in Guatemala and El Salvador; intriguingly, producer Manuel Zeceña was able to get Alemán and Aguirre to work together despite their strained relationship. Interiors were filmed mainly in San Salvador, in private homes in Santa Tecla and the exclusive neighborhoods of Escalón and San Benito. The exteriors, on the other hand, were filmed at tourist attractions in Puerta del Diablo and Planes de Renderos, as well as in El Salvador; however, since the plot centers around a tourist who went to Central America to watch the Holy Week processions, several processions were filmed in Guatemala City. Therefore, the movie takes place in a fictitious city which is represented alternately by San Salvador and Guatemala City.

== Soundtrack ==
The soundtrack was composed by French composer Charles Trenet. The Salvadorian singers Los Hermanos Cárcamo (The Cárcamo Brothers) sang the title song Te deseo, amor (I lust for you, love). In February 2002 Roberto Cárcamo, the lead singer, told an interviewer that they had the opportunity to perform for the movie after Julio Alemán heard them at Hotel El Salvador Intercontinental, where he was staying during filming.

== Reception ==
In Costa Rica, the movie opened in May 1967 and due to the plot's strong controversy for the times, it was shown in a censored version and only for mature audiences at least 21 years old.

== Top billed cast ==
- Elsa Aguirre: Remedios
- Julio Alemán: Andrés Villalta
- Regina Torné: Carmen
- Rodolfo Landa: Marcial (Remedios' husband)
- Cosmo Alessio
- Herbert Meneses
