= Santa Cruz del Quiché =

- Municipality
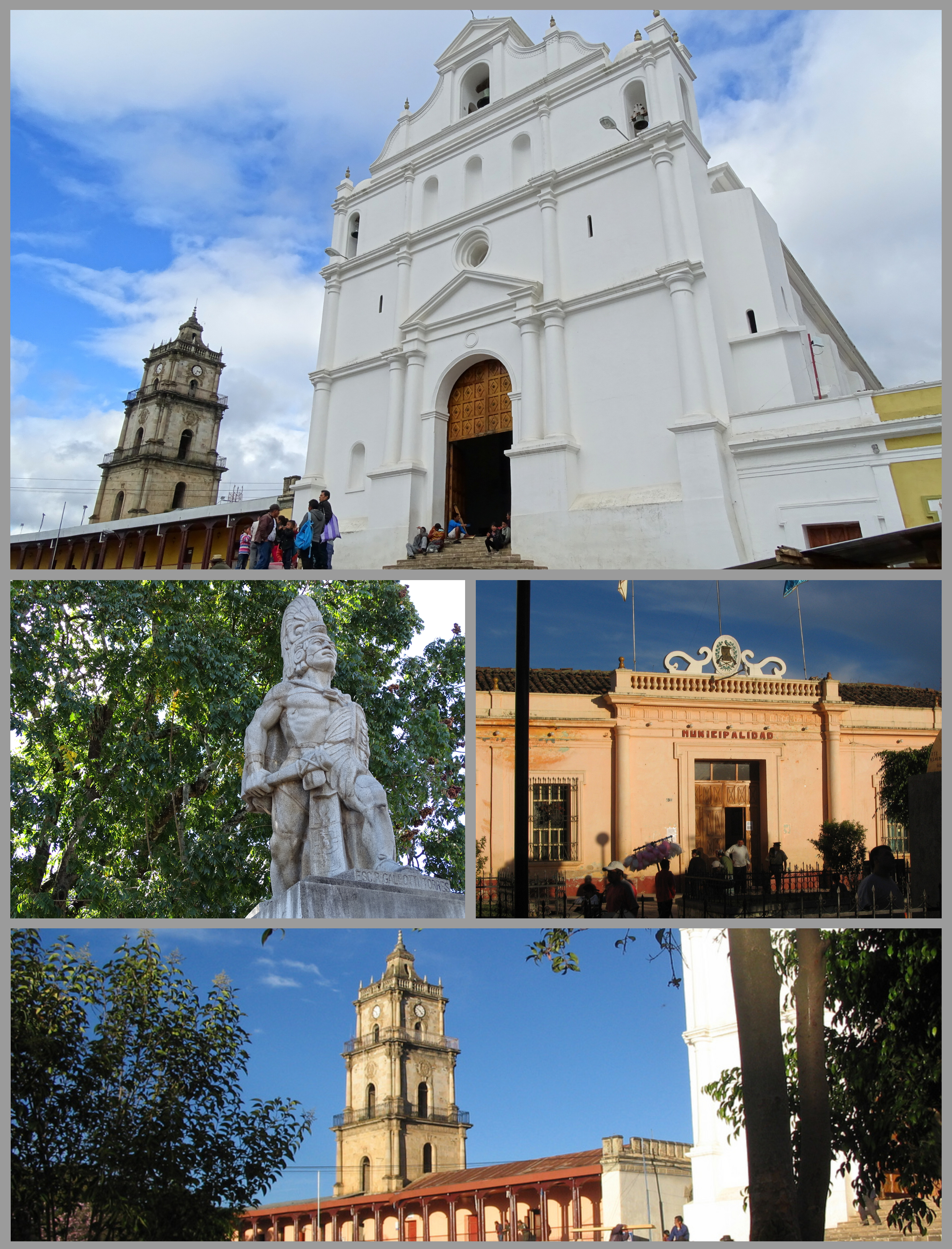
- Holy Cross Cathedral, statue of Tecún Umán, municipal office, governmental palace

- Location in Guatemala Santa Cruz del Quiché (Quiché Department)
- Coordinates: 15°1′48″N 91°9′0″W
- Country: Guatemala
- Department: El Quiché
- Municipality: Santa Cruz del Quiché

Government
  - Type: Municipal
  - Mayor: Rosendo Jerónimo Salvador Cuterez (LIDER)

Area
  - Municipality: 271 km^{2} (105 sq mi)
- Elevation: 2,021 m (6,631 ft)
- Highest elevation: 2,500 m (8,200 ft)
- Lowest elevation: 1,500 m (4,900 ft)

Population (Census 2018)
  - Municipality: 78,279
  - Density: 289/km^{2} (748/sq mi)
  - Urban: 78,279
  - Ethnicities: K'iche' Ladino
  - Religions: Roman Catholicism Evangelicalism Maya
- Climate: Cwb
- Website: http://www.inforpressca.com/quiche/

Santa Cruz del Quiché is a city, with a population of 78,279 (2018 census), in Guatemala. It serves as the capital of the El Quiché department and the municipal seat of Santa Cruz del Quiché municipality. The city is located at 15.03°N 91.15°W, at an elevation of 2,021 m (6,631 feet) above sea level. It has an airport, Quiché Airport, located just south of the city.

== History ==
Santa Cruz del Quiché was founded by Pedro de Alvarado, a companion and second in-command of conquistador Hernán Cortés, after he burned down the nearby Maya capital city of Q'umarkaj (or Utatlán, in the Nahuatl language). The oldest buildings, including a large cathedral and clock tower in the central plaza, were constructed out of the stones of the Q'umarkaj ruins by the Dominicans. Some think it likely that it was in Santa Cruz where a group of anonymous K'iche' nobles of the Nim Ch'okoj class transcribed the Popol Vuh, the sacred text of the Maya.

In Santa Cruz, the former rulers of Q'umarkaj were reduced to the status of peasant.

=== Pacific conquest by the Dominican friars ===
On his second visit to Guatemala, in 1537, friar Bartolomé de las Casas, O.P. wanted to employ his new method of conversion based on two principles: 1) to preach the Gospel to all men and treat them as equals, and 2) to assert that conversion must be voluntary and based on knowledge and understanding of the Faith. It was important for Las Casas that this method be tested without meddling from secular colonists, so he chose a territory in the heart of Guatemala where there were no previous colonies and where the natives were considered fierce and war-like. Because it had not been possible to conquer the land by military means, the governor of Guatemala, Alonso de Maldonado, agreed to sign a contract promising that if the venture was successful he would not establish any new encomiendas in the area. Las Casas's group of friars established a Dominican presence in Rabinal, Sacapulas and Cobán, reaching as far as Chahal. Through the efforts of Las Casas' missionaries the so-called "Land of War" came to be called "Verapaz", "True Peace". Las Casas's strategy was to teach Christian songs to merchant Indian Christians who then ventured into the area. In this way he was successful in converting several native chiefs, among them those of Atitlán and Chichicastenango, and in building several churches in the territory named Alta Verapaz. These congregated a group of Christian Indians in the location of what is now the town of Rabinal. In 1538 Las Casas was recalled from his mission by Bishop Francisco Marroquín who wanted him to go to Mexico and then on to Spain in order to seek more Dominicans to assist in the mission.

=== Monastery and doctrine of Order of Preachers ===
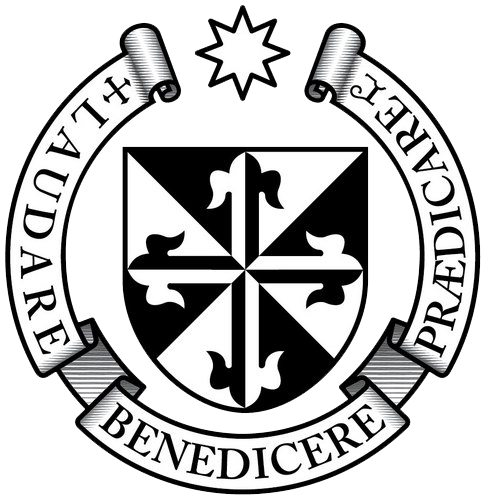
Order of Preachers coat of arms

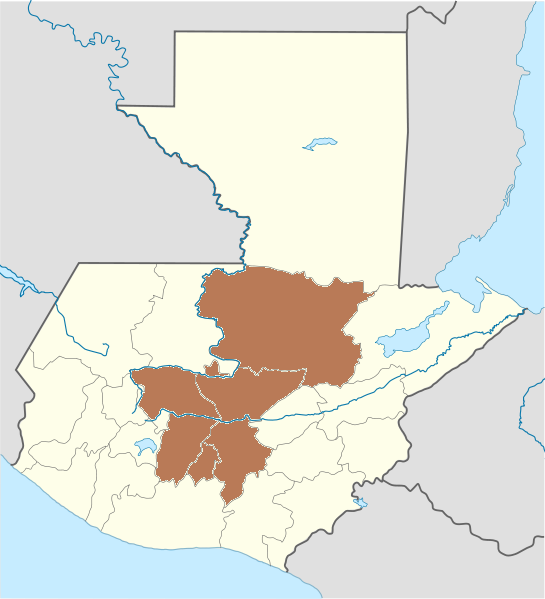
Order of Preachers convents during the Spanish colony en Guatemala and the approximate area of their surrounding doctrines

After the conquest, the Spanish crown focused on the Catholic indoctrination of the natives. Human settlements founded by royal missionaries in the New World were called "Indian doctrines" or simply "doctrines". Originally, friars had only temporary missions: teach the Catholic faith to the natives, and then transfer the settlements to secular parishes, just like the ones that existed in Spain at the time; the friars were supposed to teach Spanish and Catholicism to the natives. When the natives were ready, they could start living in parishes and contribute with mandatory tithing, just like the people in Spain.

However, this plan never materialized, mainly because the Spanish crown lost control of the regular orders as soon as their friars set course to America. Shielded by their apostolic privileges granted to convert natives into Catholicism, the missionaries only responded to their order local authorities, and never to that of the Spanish government or the secular bishops. The orders local authorities, in turn, only dealt with their own order and not with the Spanish crown. Once a doctrine had been established, the protected their own economic interests, even against those of the King and thus, the doctrines became Indian towns that remains unaltered for the rest of the Spanish colony.

The doctrines were founded at the friars discretion, given that they were completely at liberty to settle communities provided the main purpose was to eventually transfer it as a secular parish which would be tithing of the bishop. In reality, what happened was that the doctrines grew uncontrollably and were never transferred to any secular parish; they formed around the place where the friars had their monastery and from there, they would go out to preach to settlements that belong to the doctrine and were called "annexes", "visits" or "visit towns". Therefore, the doctrines had three main characteristics:

- they were independent from external controls (both ecclesiastical and secular)
- were run by a group of friars
- had a relatively larger number of annexes

The main characteristic of the doctrines was that they were run by a group of friars, because it made sure that the community system would continue without any issue when one of the members died.

In 1638, the Order of Preachers split their large doctrines — which meant large economic benefits for them — in groups centered around each one of their six monasteries, including the Sacapulas monastery:

Order of Preachers' doctrines in Sacapulas in 1638
Convent	Doctrines
Sacapulas	Sacapulas; Cunén; Nebaj; Santa Cruz del Quiché; San Andrés Sajcabajá; Zacualpa; Chichicastenango

In 1754, the Order of Preachers had to transfer all of their doctrines and convents to the secular clergy, as part of the Bourbon reforms.

=== Pan American highway ===
In the 20th century, the Pan-American Highway passed Santa Cruz by, making it less a gateway to the Western Highlands and only the main stop on the road to the North of el Quiché. As the living conditions for the Indigenous people were so pitiful in the city, the town of Santo Tomás Chichicastenango, about 20 miles to the south of Santa Cruz, began to swell with the immigration of displaced Mayas and soon passed up Santa Cruz in both size and importance.

=== Guatemalan Civil War ===
During the Guatemalan Civil War Santa Cruz del Quiché found itself in the area where the Ejército Guerrillero de los Pobres - one of the guerrilla organizations that operated in Guatemala - was active. This organization justified its terrorist attacks against private and public infrastructure by saying that they only impacted the economic interests of both the state and the country's productive sector, and that it made the Guatemalan Army more vulnerable. In the Comisión para el Esclarecimiento Histórico final report, former EGP members said that "destroying infrastructure just under the concept of destroying the country's infrastructure, to damage the country, that did not happen. There was always an explanation... in context with the war that we were sustaining at the time and in context within the tactic moment when we were going to blow up a bridge, yes, we were going to blow it up so that the Army could not go through and to stop it from its barbarism... to cut its advances and withdraws- But from Nentón to the North, the highway was closed [end of 1981 to beginning of 1982], the Army did not get in, not a single authority would come in, and the telegraph posts -which were the other communication device that existed- were taken down". "When we cut power to some (Army) barracks the power to the closest towns and village was cut as well, creating resentment in the population. Afterwards, the sabotages were commonplace in order to create chaos along the country and preparing the conditions of a pre insurrection state".

The EGP attacks that affected Santa Cruz del Quiché were:

Date	Target	Result
16 November 1981	State Power Institute facilities in Santa Cruz del Quiché	Left without power all of the nearby municipalities.
18 December 1981	«El Tesoro» Bruidge in Quiché Department	The bridge was completely destroyed, cutting any Army access.
21 December 1981	Cunén's town hall building and telegraph facilities	Set the buildings on fire to destroy any civil records.
19 January 1982	State Power Institute facilities in Santa Cruz del Quiché	Left without power all of the nearby municipalities.
27 January 1982	Bridges that communicated to San Miguel Uspantán, Nebaj and Chajul in Quiché Department	Completely destroyed both bridges, cutting any access to the Army.

In order to counterattack the guerrilla offensive after the victory of the Sandinista Revolution in Nicaragua in 1979, general Lucas García's government began a "Scorched earth" offensive of its own in the area controlled by the Ejército Guerrillero de los Pobres, -Chajul, Nebaj and Ixcán in Quiché Department-i.e., agricultural and oil-reach region of the Northern Transversal strip-; as part of this offensive, there were intense attacks on civil communities with resulted in massacres that were duly recorded in both the REHMI and Comisión para el Esclarecimiento Histórico final reports.

The Army Base outside the city of Santa Cruz del Quiché was a major staging point for military control of the lands to the north, which were presumed under guerrilla control as they had been a hotbed for both the CUC, the campesino union, and liberation theology. Many of the Vietnam-era tactics used during the intense fighting from 1977 to 1984 were launched from there, including the control of the Ixil Triangle, the settlements of "model villages" outside of Nebaj and other major violence.

In several cases, massacres occurred either at a special day for a community or during large scale operatives with large military force displays and aviation backup. The airplanes bombed certain zones; at least one of each nine communities suffered a bombing associated to a massacre, either in the previous or following days. The areas more heavily bombed were the Ixil triangle and Sacapulas, some parts of Baja Verapaz Department and also from Huehuetenango Department. After an attack of this kind it was common that up to 40% of the surviving population left town to survive, going into the mountains, into exile in Mexico or to another community. The maya k'iche' population that looked for refuge in the mountains was labeled as "guerrilla" by the Army, which tighten military controls around them and continuous attacks that made it extremely hard to get food or medical attention. These people remained in the mountains for almost two years until they finally moved to Las Guacamayas, where they became isolated due to the military pressure. A lot of people died of starvation.

== Climate ==
Santa Cruz del Quiché has a subtropical highland climate (Köppen: Cwb).

Climate data for Santa Cruz del Quiché
Month	Jan	Feb	Mar	Apr	May	Jun	Jul	Aug	Sep	Oct	Nov	Dec	Year
Mean daily maximum °C (°F)	21.0 (69.8)	22.3 (72.1)	23.6 (74.5)	24.6 (76.3)	24.4 (75.9)	22.8 (73.0)	22.6 (72.7)	23.2 (73.8)	22.9 (73.2)	22.4 (72.3)	22.1 (71.8)	21.3 (70.3)	22.8 (73.0)
Daily mean °C (°F)	15.1 (59.2)	15.8 (60.4)	17.0 (62.6)	18.2 (64.8)	18.9 (66.0)	18.2 (64.8)	17.6 (63.7)	17.5 (63.5)	17.6 (63.7)	17.2 (63.0)	16.2 (61.2)	15.3 (59.5)	17.1 (62.7)
Mean daily minimum °C (°F)	9.3 (48.7)	9.4 (48.9)	10.5 (50.9)	11.9 (53.4)	13.4 (56.1)	13.6 (56.5)	12.7 (54.9)	11.9 (53.4)	12.3 (54.1)	12.1 (53.8)	10.3 (50.5)	9.3 (48.7)	11.4 (52.5)
Average precipitation mm (inches)	1 (0.0)	1 (0.0)	9 (0.4)	25 (1.0)	72 (2.8)	242 (9.5)	179 (7.0)	162 (6.4)	186 (7.3)	116 (4.6)	34 (1.3)	1 (0.0)	1,028 (40.3)
Source: Climate-Data.org

== Geographic location ==
Santa Cruz del Quiché is surrounded by municipalities of the department of El Quiché:

== See also ==
- Bartolomé de las Casas
- El Quiché
- Guatemalan Civil War
- List of places in Guatemala
- Luis Cáncer
- Spanish conquest of Guatemala

== Notes and references ==
=== Bibliography ===
- Belaubre, Christopohe (2001). "Poder y redes sociales en Centroamérica: el caso de la Orden de los Dominicos (1757-1829)" (PDF). Mesoamérica (in Spanish). 41. Archived from the original (PDF) on 21 January 2015.
- Comisión para el Esclarecimiento Histórico: Vol. IV (1999). "Atentados contra sedes municipales". Guatemala: Memoria del Silencio (in Spanish). Programa de Ciencia y Derechos Humanos, Asociación Americana del Avance de la Ciencia. Archived from the original (online edition) on 6 May 2013.
- Juarros, Domingo (1818). Compendio de la historia de la Ciudad de Guatemala (in Spanish). Guatemala: Ignacio Beteta.
- Limón Aguirre, Fernando (2008). "La ciudadanía del pueblo chuj en México: Una dialéctica negativa de identidades" (PDF) (in Spanish). San Cristóbal de Las Casas, Mexico: El Colegio de la Frontera Sur – Unidad San Cristóbal de Las Casas. Archived from the original (PDF) on 2012-07-22.
- Lovell, W. George (2005). Conquest and Survival in Colonial Guatemala: A Historical Geography of the Cuchumatán Highlands, 1500–1821 (3rd ed.). Montreal, Canada: McGill-Queen's University Press. ISBN 0-7735-2741-9. OCLC 58051691.
- van Oss, Adriaan C. (1986). Catholic Colonialism: A Parish History of Guatemala, 1524-1821. Cambridge, UK: Cambridge University Press. ISBN 9780521527125.
- Wagner, Henry Raup; Parish, Helen Rand (1967). The Life and Writings of Bartolomé de Las Casas. University of New Mexico Press.
