= Herbert Meneses =

Guatemalan actor (1939–2021)

- Born: Herbert Meneses; July 17, 1939; Ciudad de Guatemala, Guatemala
- Died: March 6, 2021 (aged 81)
- Occupation: Actor

Herbert Meneses (July 17, 1939 – March 6, 2021) was a Guatemalan actor, writer, teacher, and director of film, television, and theater productions. He began his acting career at age 11. He was part of many radio play series. The government of Guatemala produced a homage to Meneses in 2015.

== Filmography ==
- Sólo de noche vienes (1967)
- The Silence of Neto (1994)
- Donde acaban los caminos
- Invisible evidence
- El ogro
- Trampa para una niña
- La vaca
