= Holy Week processions in Guatemala =

Holy Week in Guatemala

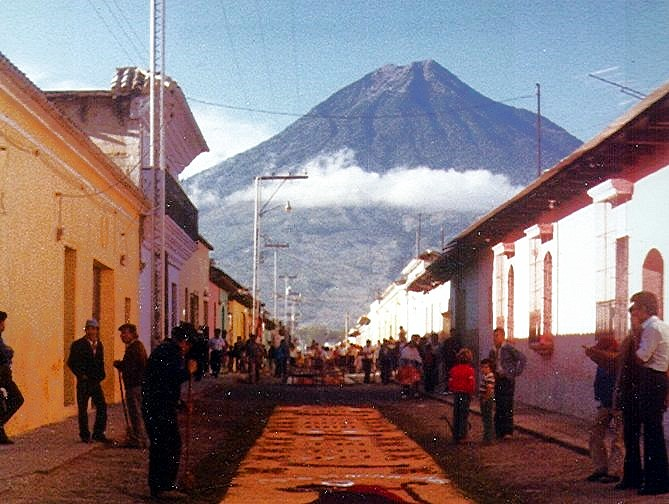
Sawdust carpet in Antigua Guatemala. In the background, Volcán de Agua.

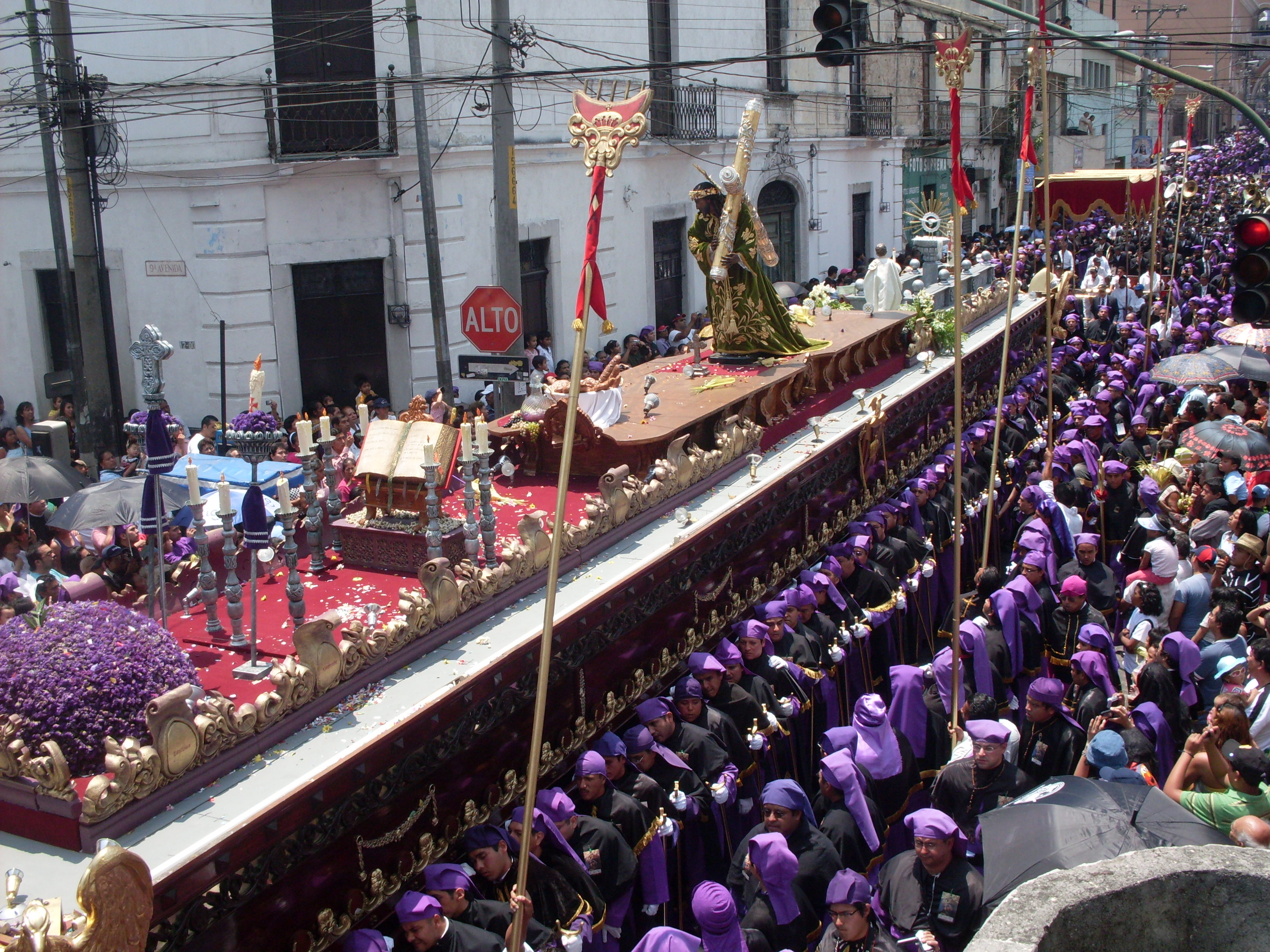
Jesús de los Milagros procession, San José Church, Palm Sunday in Guatemala City

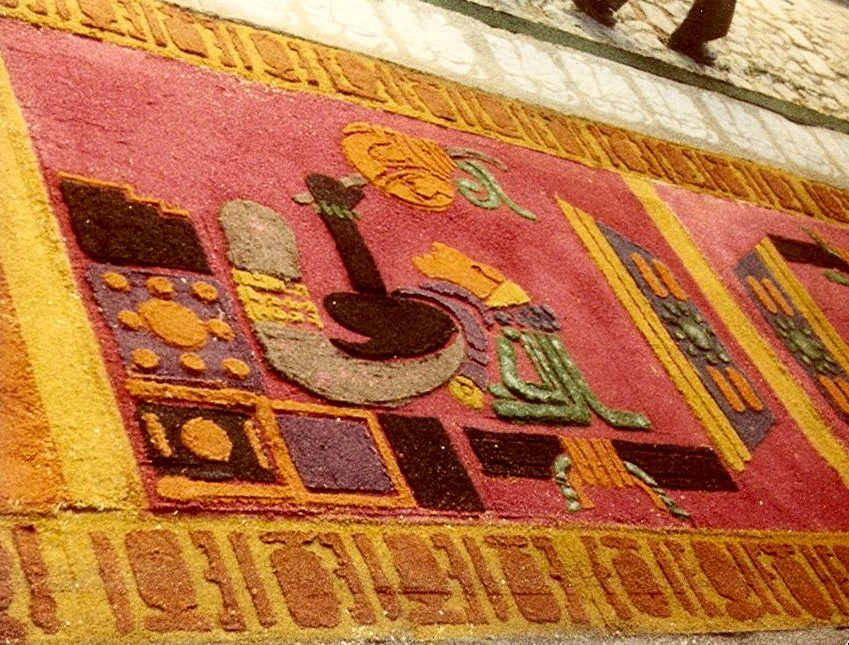
Sawdust carpet in Antigua Guatemala with Maya motives.

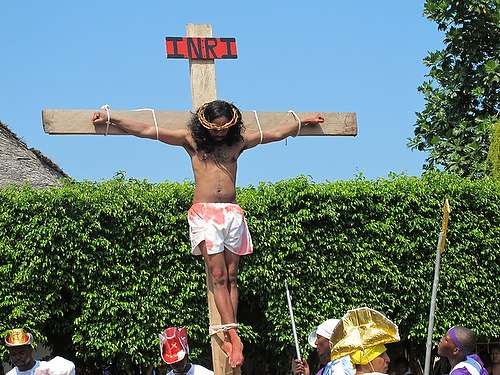
Live crucifixion representation in Livingston, Izabal

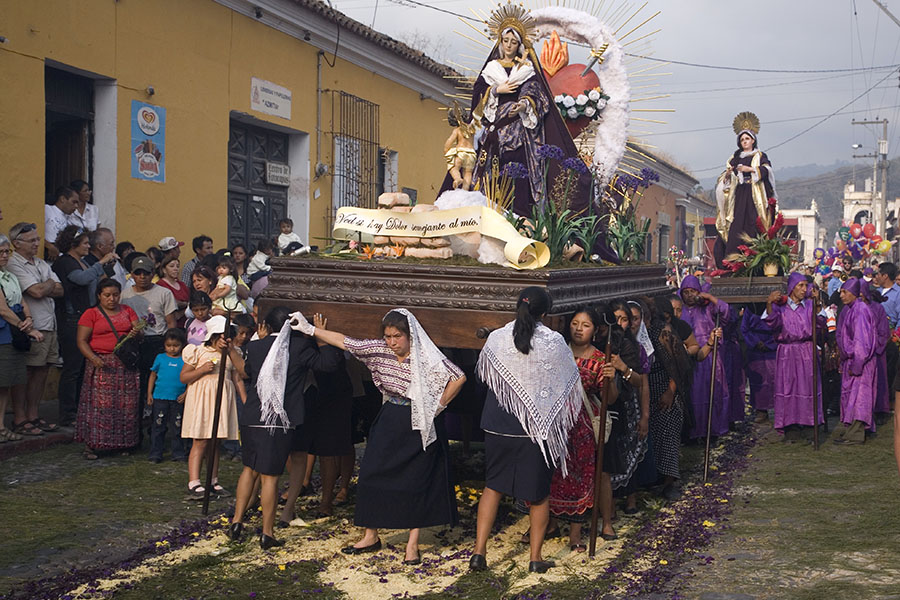
Virgen Dolorosa in her Good Friday procession.

Semana Santa or Holy Week in Guatemala is celebrated with street expressions of faith, called processions, usually organized by a "hermandad". Each procession of Holy Week has processional floats and steps, which are often religious images of the Passion of Christ, or Marian images, although there are exceptions, like the allegorical steps of saints.

== History ==
The Catholic fervor that currently exists in Guatemala has almost magical and mystical dyes due to the syncretism between the Mayan religion and the Catholic doctrine; it combines elements dating from the old American cultures and from Catholicism imposed by the Spanish in the Colonial era.

Syncretism appears in subtle factors such as figure drawing of a butterfly on the sawdust carpet for a Christ procession, because the butterfly was more than a mere insect for the Maya. It symbolized the Sun -one of their most important deities- and also represented life and the afterlife. That image does not appear anywhere in Holy Week activities held in Spain.

=== Pre-columbine era ===
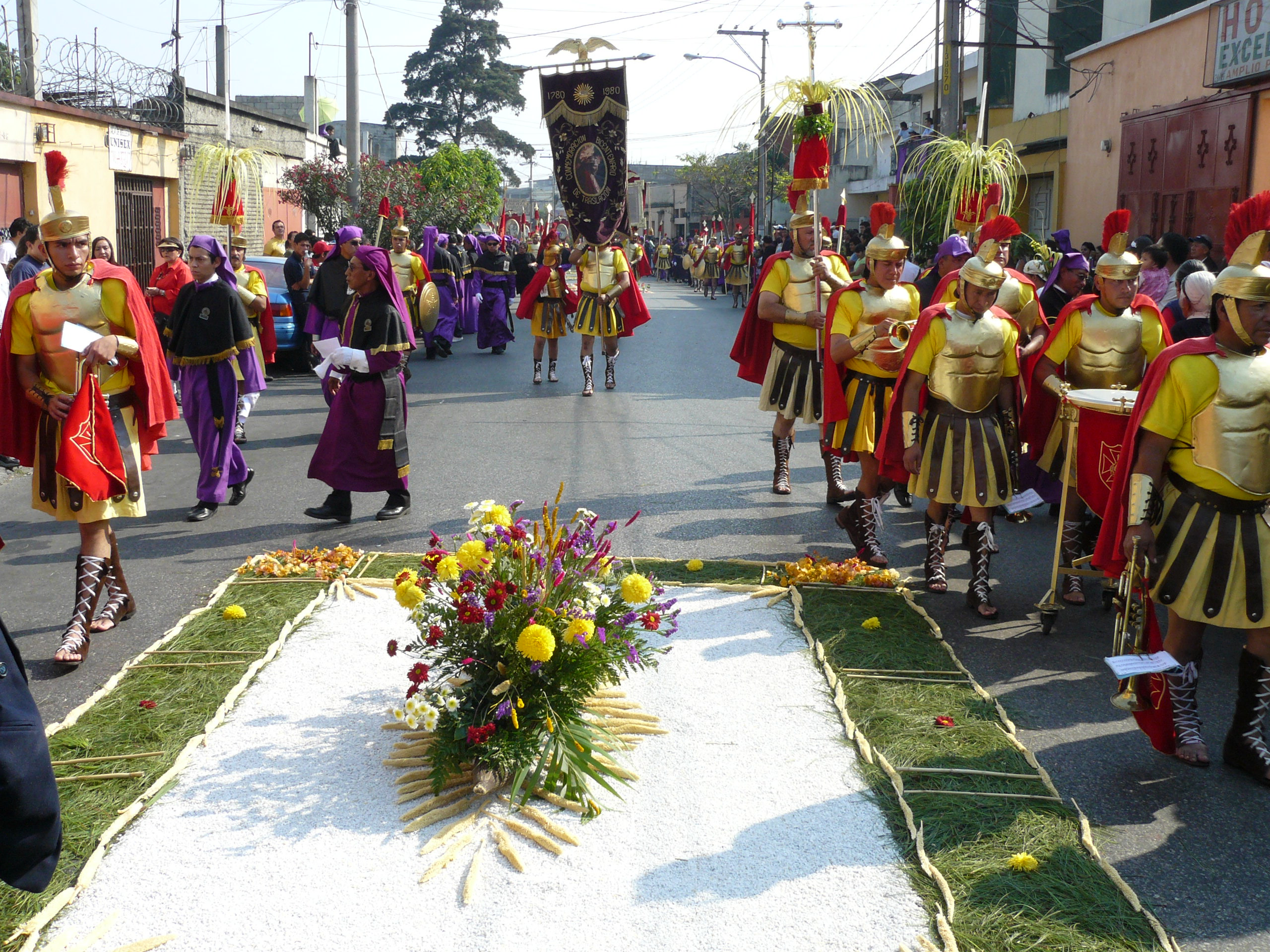
Jesús Nazareno de San José procession in Guatemala City which traditionally goes on Palm Sunday. Notice both the Catholic and the mayan insignia: Roman pendants and uniforms on one hand, and a carpet made of flowers on the other.

To understand the current Guatemalan Holy Week one must go back to the religion of the Maya, where there were amazing coincidences that perhaps helped the Catholic religion fit more with the beliefs of Native Americans. One of these similarities is that indigenous Guatemalans used a palanquin to transport wealthy citizens and rulers. (Note: As shown in the Ratinlinxul Cup, From Alta Verapaz, where there is a painting of a procession with a nobleman sit on top of several servants that are carrying him. Behind them there are five musicians, with instruments similar to trumpets. Also, a door frame in Temple I in Tikal has a sculpted scene in which a divine lord (K’ul Ahaw) is being carried on the shoulders of several people.)

The cross is not exclusive of Judeo-Christian; even in Chiapas and parts of Huehuetenango it is still used to keep out evil spirits in some villages. Also as symbolic of purification, the Mayas fasted in the final five days of your calendar as well as for special holidays.

— Juan Antonio Valdés, PhD in Archaeology

For the natives it was not difficult to understand or accept the existence of the Holy Trinity because for them, the creators of this world were three, known by Mayan scholars as "G1", "G2" and "G3"; neither was to assimilate Virgin Mary, because they associated her with Ixchel -the moon, creative life- mother.

=== Holy Week in medieval Europe ===
Holy Week was created in the Council of Nicea – set up by the Roman Emperor Constantine I in the year 325 A.D.- because in that council it was decided when to celebrate Passover and how to calculate the date for the celebration. Subsequently, the Order of the Knights Templar promoted the praise for the Passion of Christ. After the disappearance of that order, -close order fourteenth century - the Franciscans were dedicated to preserve the traditions that had been acquired over time; they were the ones who developed the Via Crucis, one of the most representative aspects of the Holy Week festivities.

The first liturgies were celebrated only among religious enclosed in churches, and sinners were not admitted. Later they evolved into processions where people took to the streets to express their guilt.

=== Bourbon Reforms ===
In 1765 the Bourbon reforms were published by the Spanish Crown, which sought to recover the real power over the colonies and increase tax collection. With these reforms, specific trade regulators were created to control the production of alcoholic beverages, snuff, gunpowder, playing cards and cock fights. The Royal Treasury auctioned annually some trade regulators and then bought them, thus becoming the owner of the monopoly of a certain product. That same year, four sub-delegations of the Royal Treasury were created in San Salvador, Ciudad Real, Comayagua and León and the political and administrative structure of the Captaincy General of Guatemala changed to 15 provinces.

In addition to this administrative redistribution, the Spanish crown established a policy to diminish the power of the Catholic Church, power that until then was virtually all over the Spanish vassals. The policy of reducing power of the church was based on the Enlightenment and had six main points:

1. Decline of Jesuit cultural heritage
2. Trend towards a secular and secularized culture
3. Decidedly rationalist attitude
4. Precedence of natural science over religious dogma
5. Severe criticism of the role of the church in society, especially the fraier and nun monasteries. These laws sought to limit excessive economic power of some brotherhoods, their large number, the lack of administrative and fiscal control by the authorities and public manifestations of piety, the latter listed as signs of backwardness and fanaticism, especially those of Holy Week.

=== 19th century ===
After the overthrow and expulsion of members of Aycinena Clan in 1829, the Liberals ousted the regular orders and just left the secular clergy in the country, although without the fixed income from mandatory tithing. This greatly weakened the Catholic Church in Guatemala, but after the failure of liberal governor Mariano Gálvez to combat an epidema of cholera morbus, parish priests incited the peasant population against him, and under the leadership of Rafael Carrera, drove Gálvez and liberal out of power. After a decade of government, Carrera allowed the return of the regular orders and conservative elite Catholics and authorized compulsory tithing again, reinforcing the church in the country and the manifestations of faith such as Holy Week flourished. Indeed, in 1852, Guatemala and the Holy See signed a concordat in which the latter was entrusted with the education of the Guatemalan population and church-state union in the country was reinforced.

After the fall of the Conservative regime and the Liberal victory in 1871, the Catholic Church suffered renewed attacks on its economic and political influence, as happened in 1829 when it was attacked by the Liberal government of Francisco Morazán. In 1873, the regular orders were again evicted, their property confiscated -including convents, haciendas and doctrines of Indians throughout the country- and mandatory tithing was abolished, leaving the secular clergy relegated to their parishes without stable income.

Article 32: It guarantees the right of association for the various purposes of life, according to law. The establishment of monastic congregations and all kind of monastic institutions or associations, as well as the formation and operation of political organizations, either of international or foreign character is prohibited. Are not included in this prohibition, organizations that advocate the Central American Union and the Pan-American or continental solidarity doctrines.

— Constitution of Guatemala of 1945

In May 1891, Pope Leo XIII issued his Rerum Novarum encyclical -The situation of workers- key document that helped Catholic Church parishes gradually transform to fit in liberal states; in Guatemala this reorganization was reinforced by a new form of reproduction of ideas expressed in the press whose images and speeches were sent to the faithful for an efficient postal service developed by the Liberal State. The progress of Catholicism in the United States began to serve as an example in the reconquest of ideological power in totally liberal states.

There was a strengthening of Catholicism during the government of General José María Reyna Barrios (1892–1898), thanks to the political opening of his government to secular clergy and his concern for the dissemination of art and the defense of local culture, which led him to subscribe to the Berne Convention, respecting the popular manifestations of faith, expressed primarily in the processions of the Passion of christ. And this was accomplished even though Reyna Barrios was a high degree Freemason. However, the official entry of the regular orders was not allowed because the Guatemalan constitution forbid their presence in its soil at the time.

=== 20th century ===
After the fall of Jacobo Arbenz regime, the Catholic Church regained some of the power he had had during the Conservative government of Rafael Carrera in the nineteenth century, and as part of it, private religious education boomed from 1955 on, with the founding of several elite schools for boys which absorbed the elite students who had previously attended classes in secular government institutions.

Even though the Archbishop of Guatemala, Mariano Rossell y Arellano, published a letter explaining that the Catholic Church was not seeking privileges in its fight against Arbenz, he managed to get that the government of Colonel Carlos Castillo Armas incorporated in the Constitution of 1956 these:

- the legal capacity of the Catholic Church-and all other churches- to acquire, hold and dispose of property, provided they are intended for religious and social work or education.
- religious education was declared optional in official premises: Article 97 of the Constitution states that the law would regulate regard to religious education in official premises and that the State did not impart but declared optional. It also guarantees freedom of education in all other establishments.
- the state would contribute to the maintenance of religious education: Article 111 states that private institutions providing free education will be exempt from certain state and municipal tax in compensation for their services.

Rossell y Arellano started an aggressive campaign to get Catholicism back in Guatemala: he restored the Archbishop's Palace and the residence of Bishop Francisco Marroquín in San Juan del Obispo, Sacatepequez; on July 22, 1953 he received fathers Antonio Rodríguez Pedrazuela and José María Báscones who began the work of Opus Dei in Guatemala; and in 1959 held the First Central American Eucharistic Congress. Gradually he managed the get regular orders back to Guatemala and participated in several sessions of the Second Vatican Council, organized by Pope John XXIII.

Over the years, and with advances in transportation and communication, the number of pilgrims and devotion to the Lord of Esquipulas made the city "Latin American Capital of Faith". In 1956 Pope Pius XII erected the Prelature Nullius Cristi of Esquipulas, which is formed by the Municipality of Esquipulas and its cathedral Sanctuary. The Pope also appointed as Prime Esquipulas Prelate Archbishop Rossell y Arellano. One of the first concerns of Rossell was seeking a religious community to take over the pastoral care of the temple; after many failed initiatives, he managed to find support from the Benedictine Abbey of San José in Louisiana, United States. On Palm Sunday of 1959, the first three Benedictine monks arrived at Esquipulas and founded the Benedictine Monastery. (Note: United Fruit Company headquarters were in New Orleans at the time.) Considering many religious, cultural and historical aspects Pope John XXIII agreed to the request made by Bishop Rossell Arellano and raised the Sanctuary of Esquipulas to the rank of Minor Basilica in 1961.

Some older traditions have declined, such as the tall, cone-shaped capirote hats, formerly worn by the penitents, who are called cucuruchos ("cones", after the shape of the hat). Echoes of this may still be seen in ceremonial parades, in which purple-robed Catholics carry a statue down the street over a temporary, handmade alfombra ("rug") made of colored sawdust, sand, and other materials. Each alfombra is an artwork that takes hours to make and is destroyed as people walk across it.

== Holy Week art ==
=== Sculptures ===
Procession sculptures

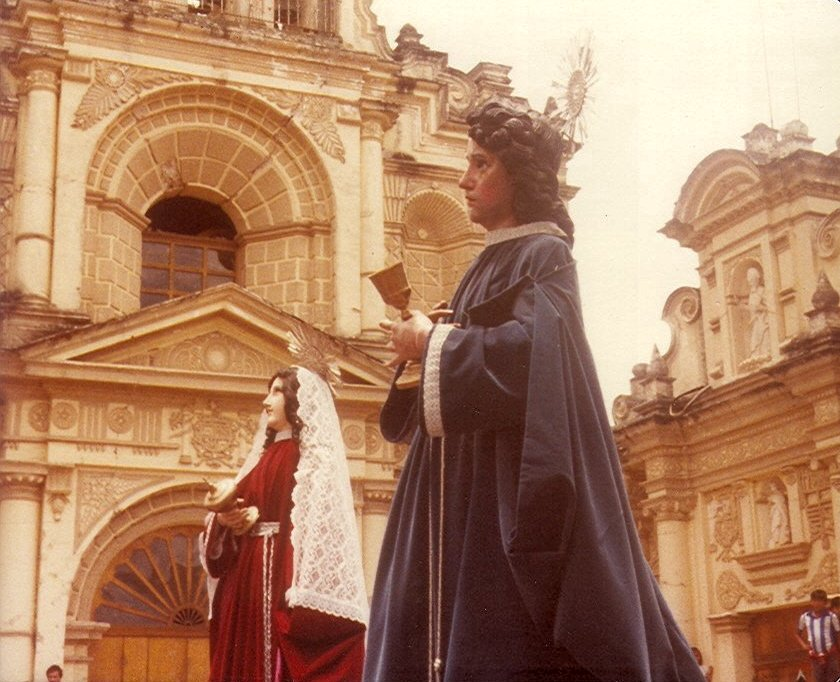
María Magdalena y San Juan de la iglesia de La Merced, Antigua Guatemala

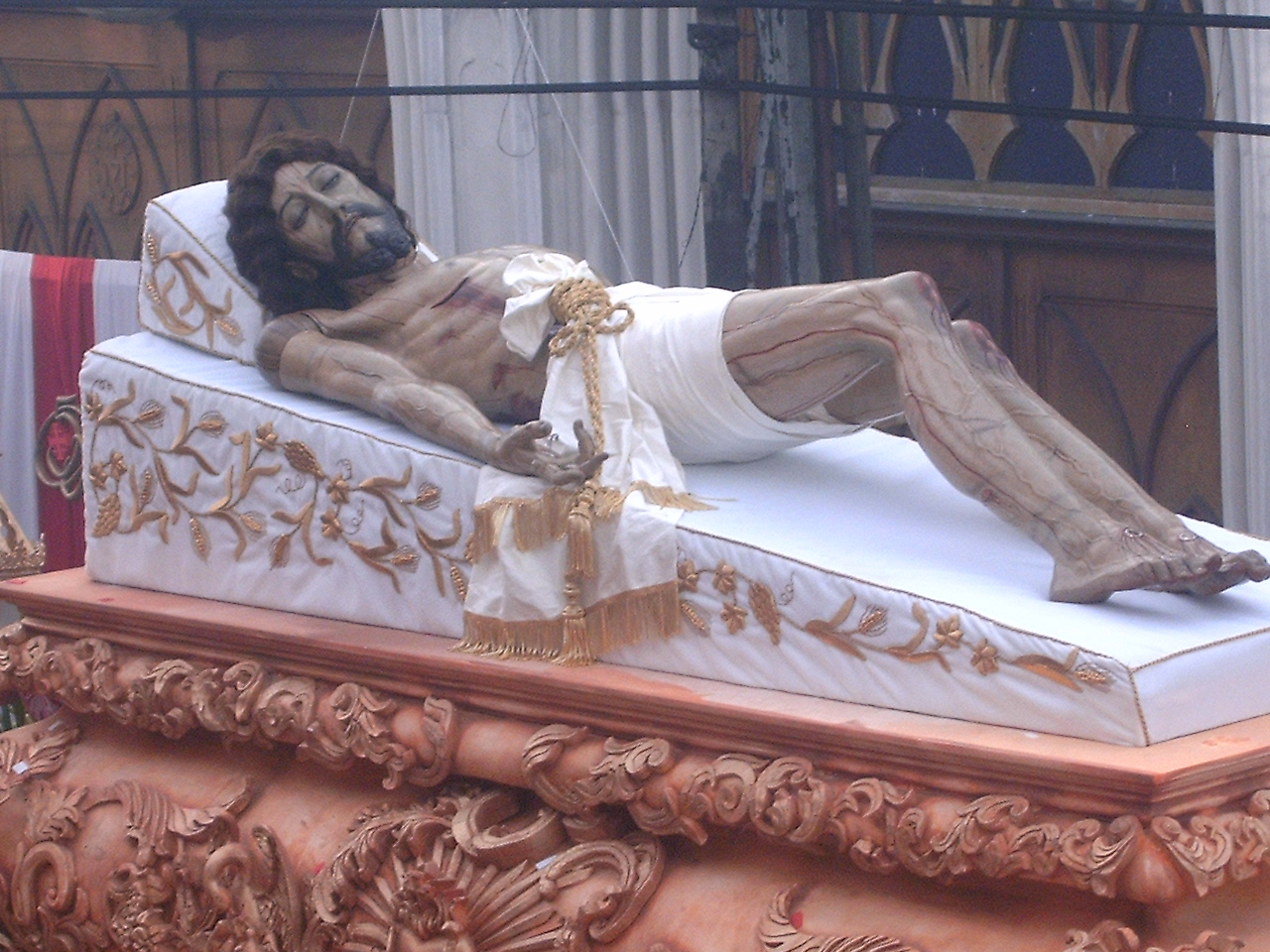
Cristo Yacente from La Recoleccion in Guatemala City.

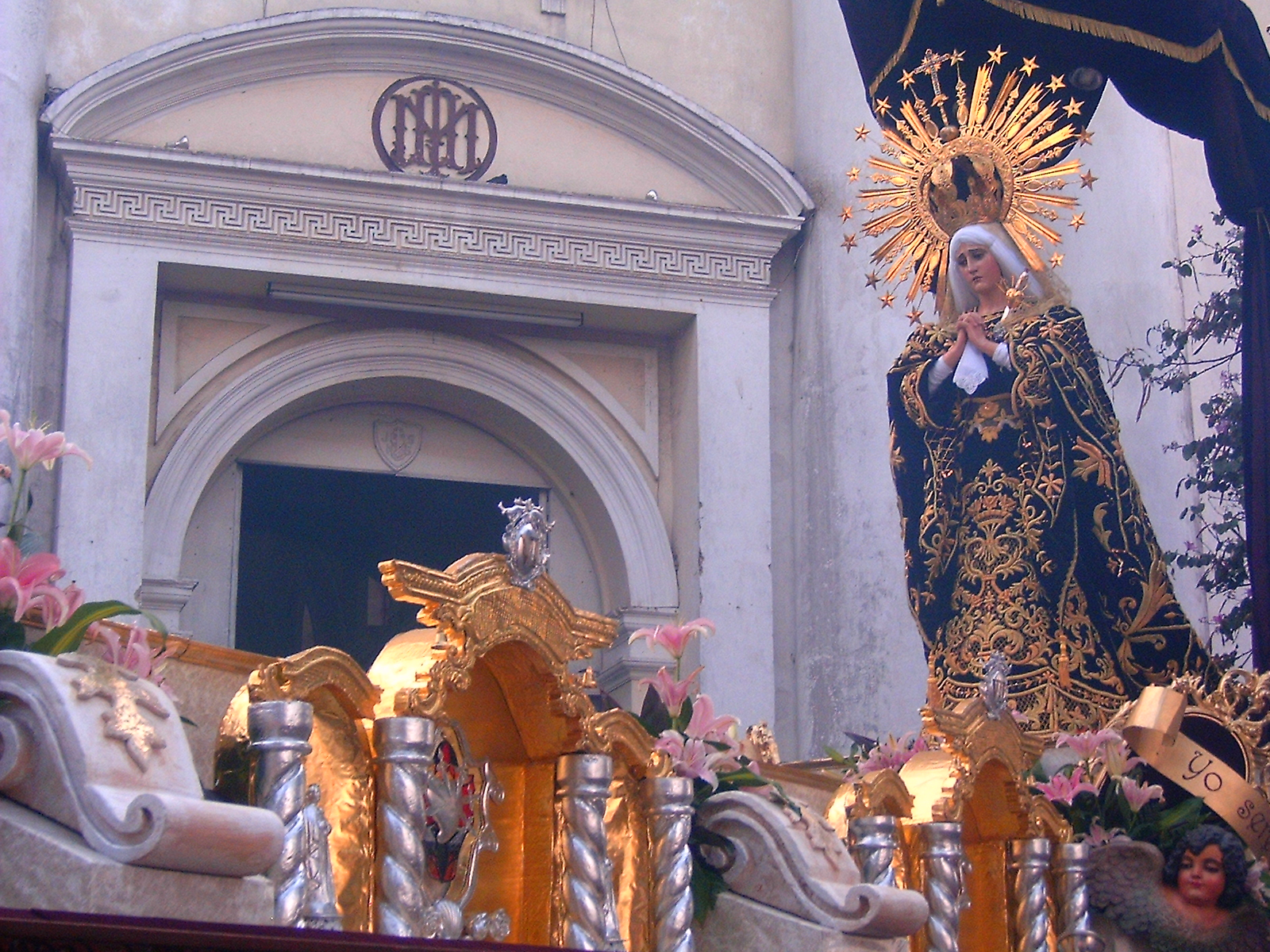
Virgen Dolorosa from La Recoleccion.

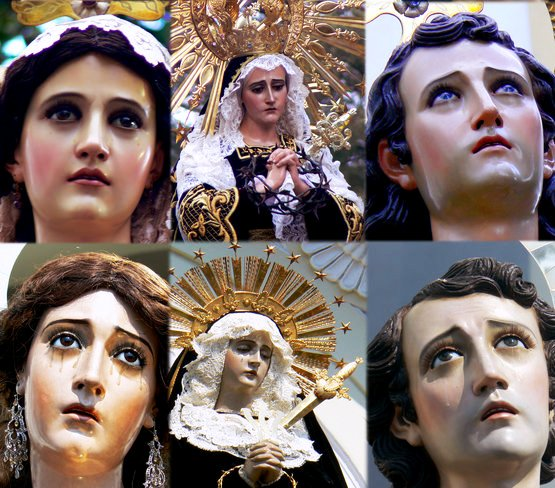
Procession sculptures from various churches. Guatemala City.

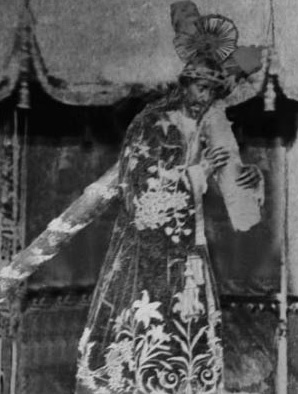
Jesús de Candelaria in 1898; Guatemala City

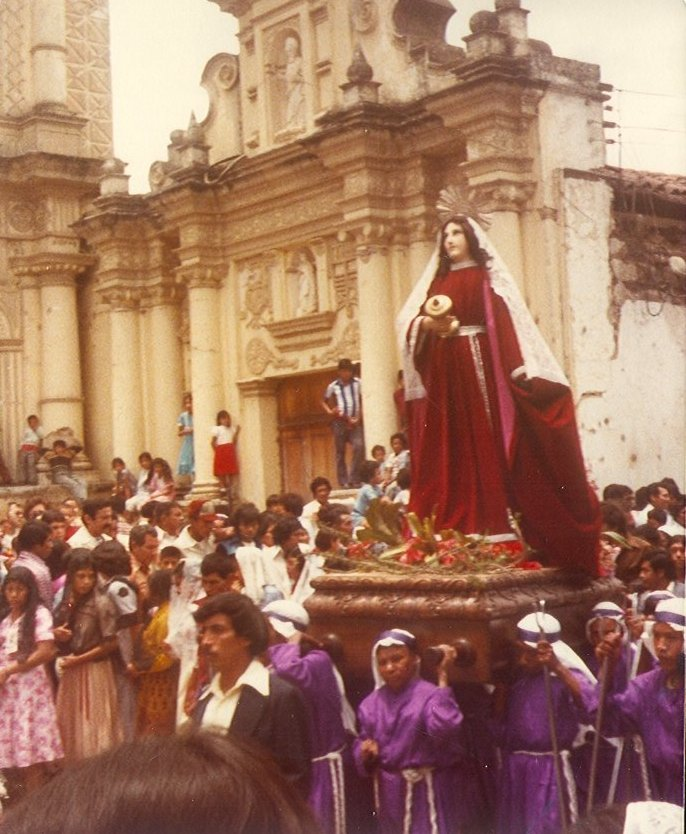
Mary of Magdala from La Merced, Antigua Guatemala

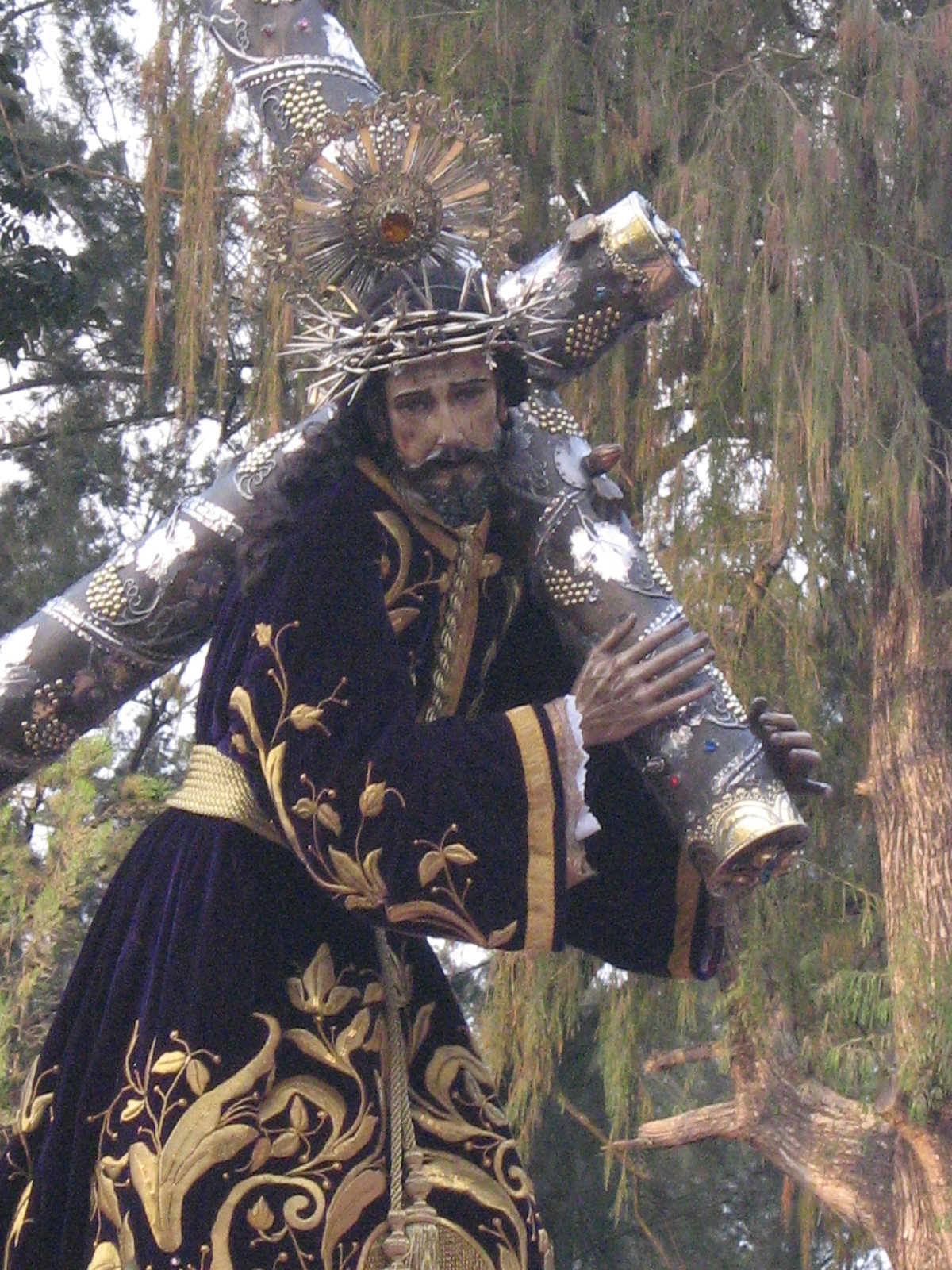
Jesús de la Merced, Guatemala City

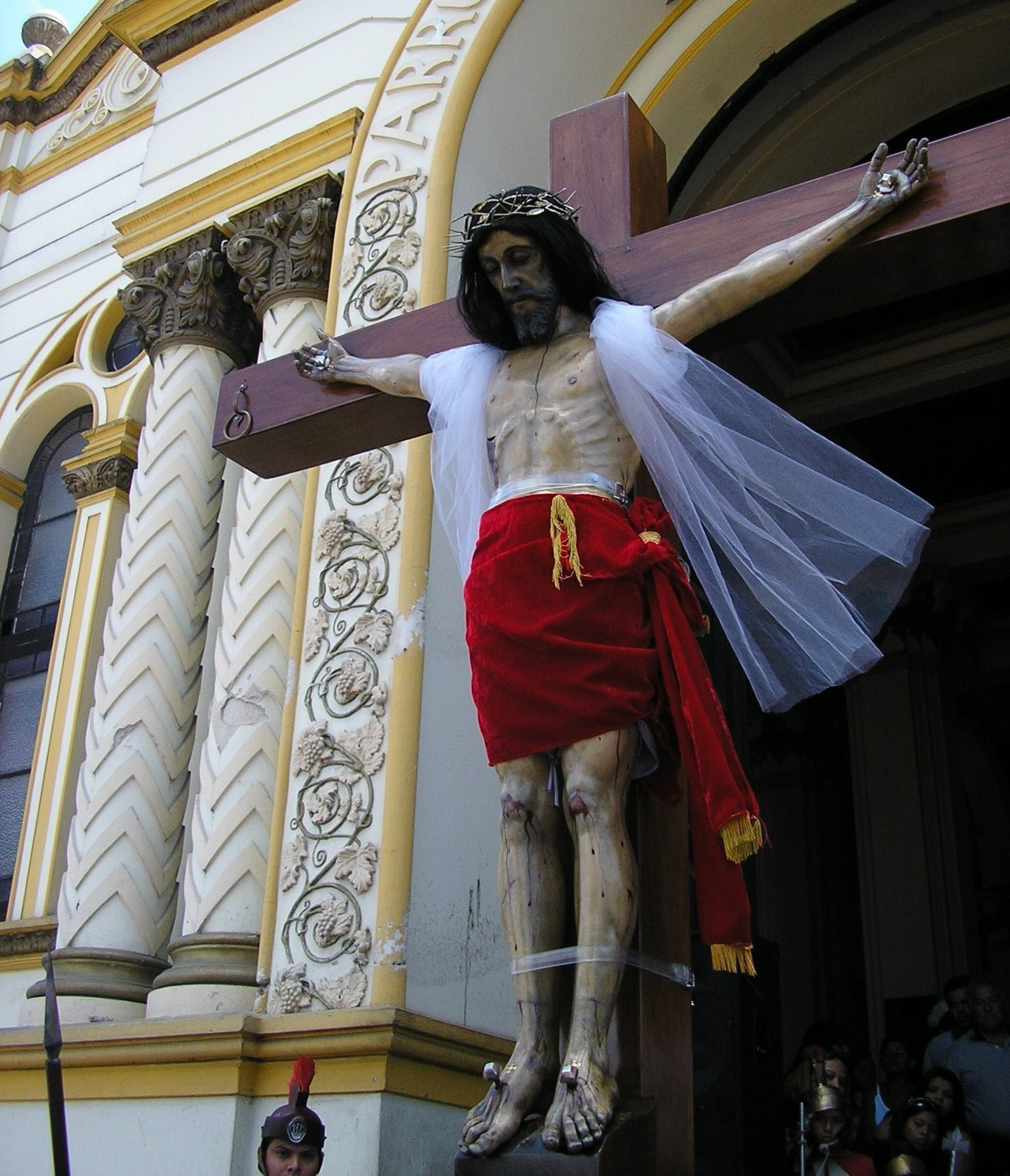
Cristo Yacente of El Calvario, Guatemala city

=== Ephemeral Art ===
The city of Antigua is known for the creation of alfombras, or temporary carpets made of colored sawdust and flowers, along the processional routes.

Antigua Guatemala sawdust carpets
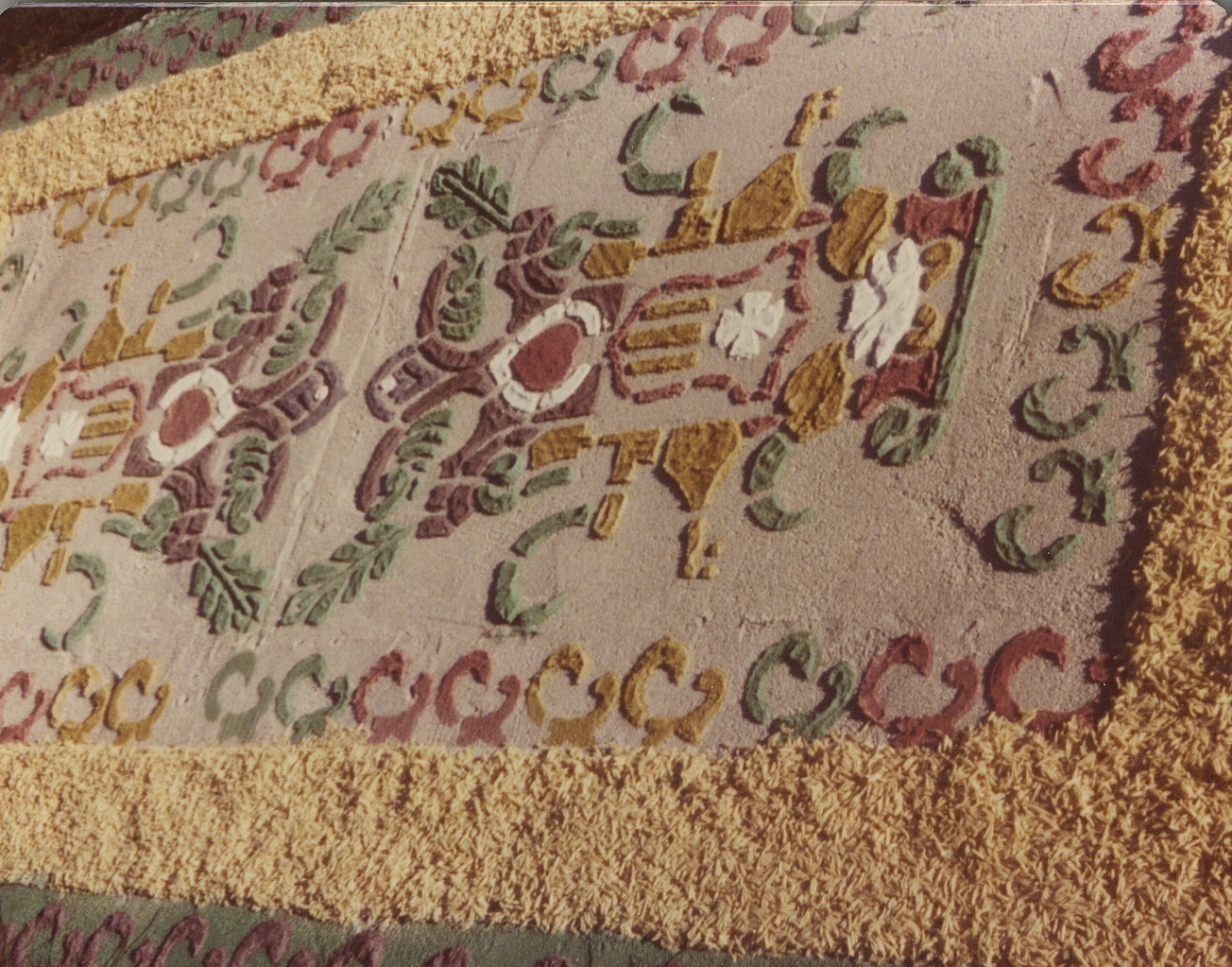
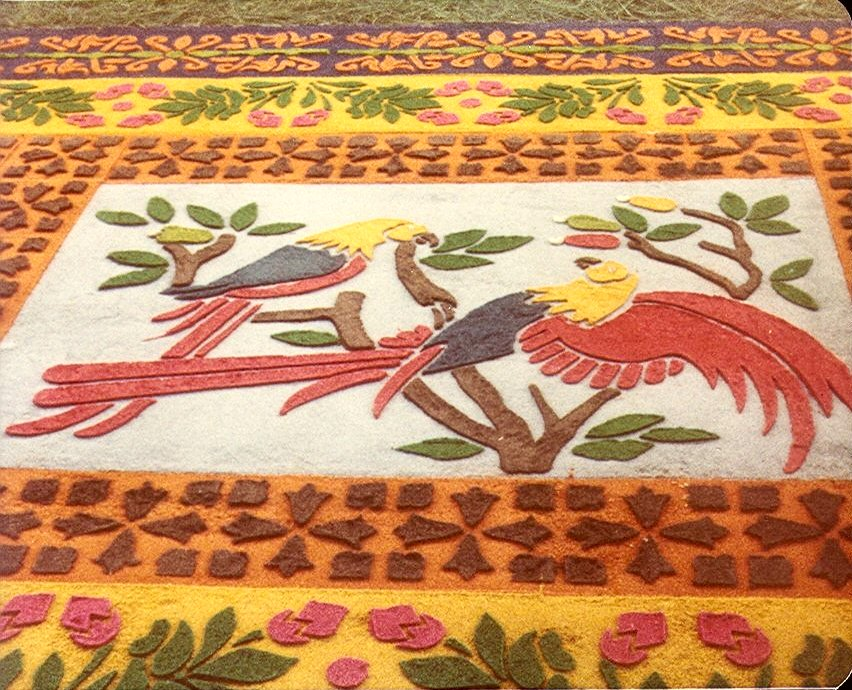
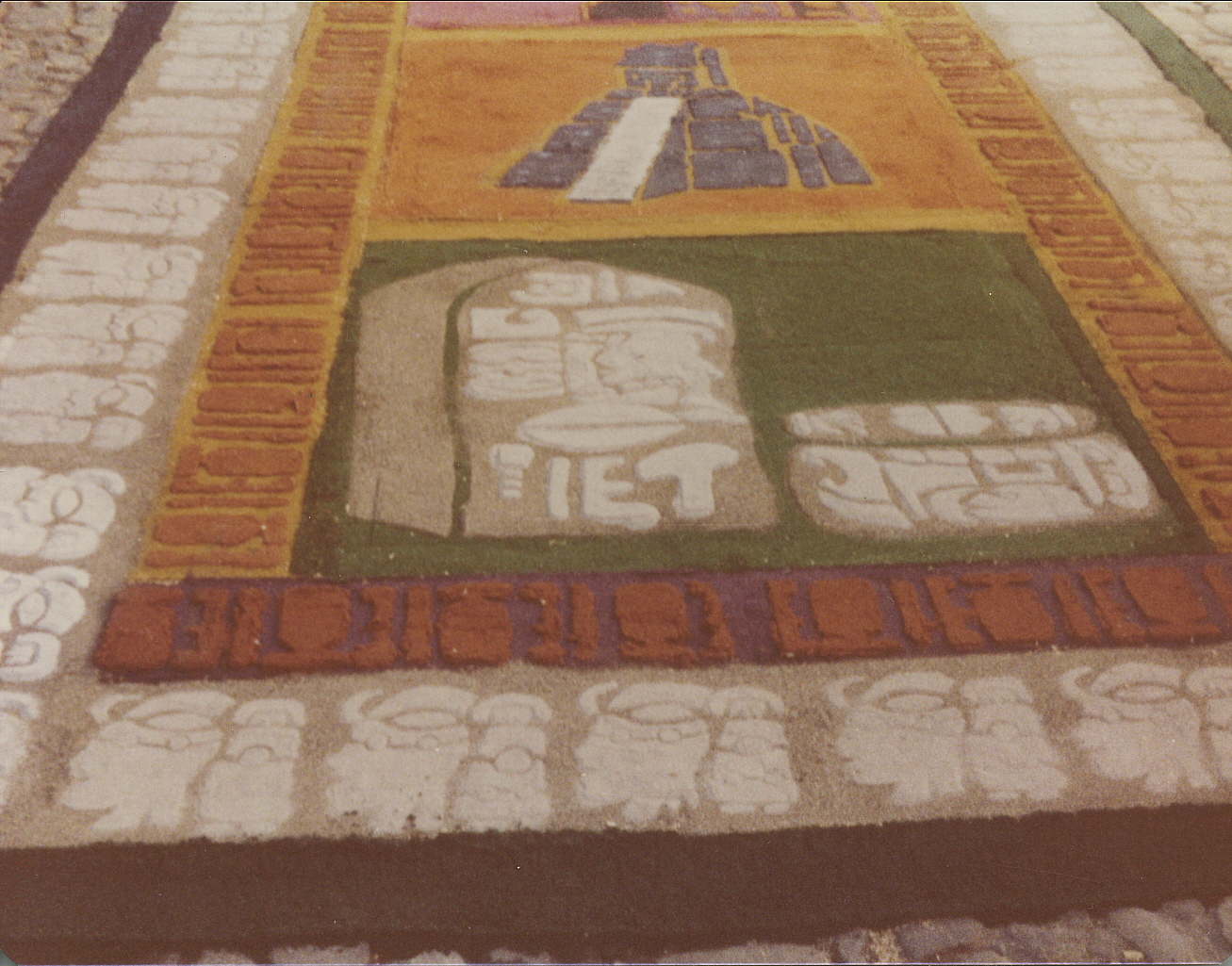
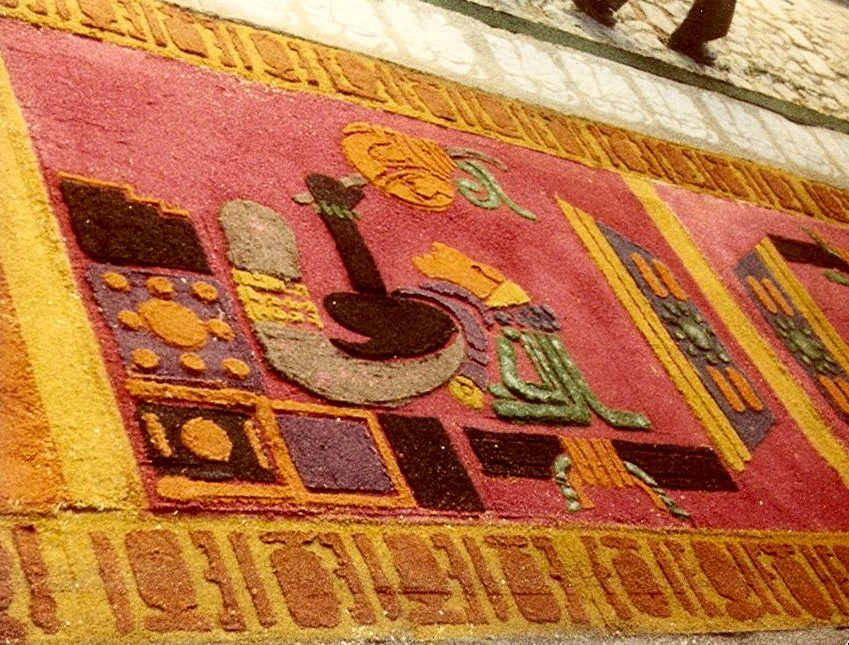
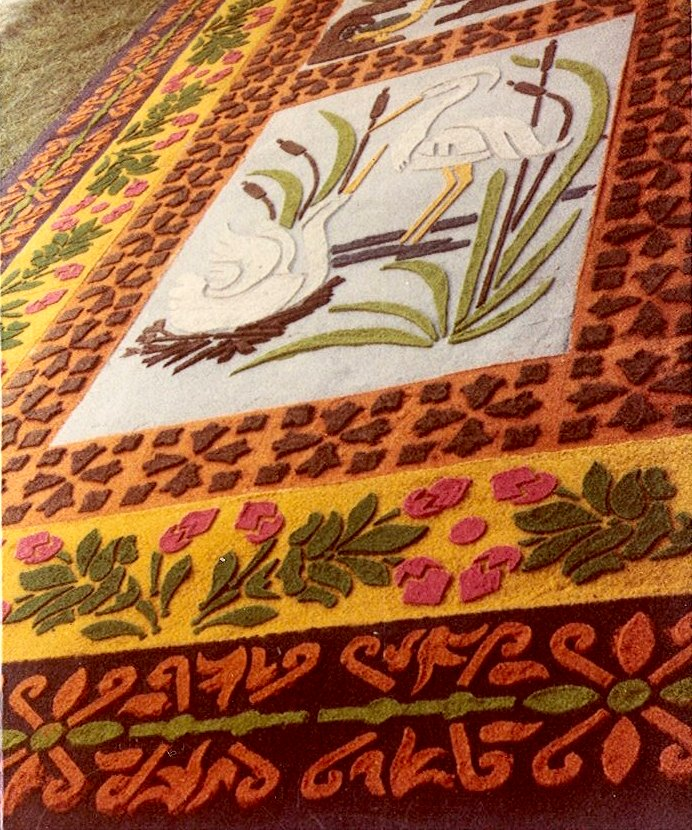
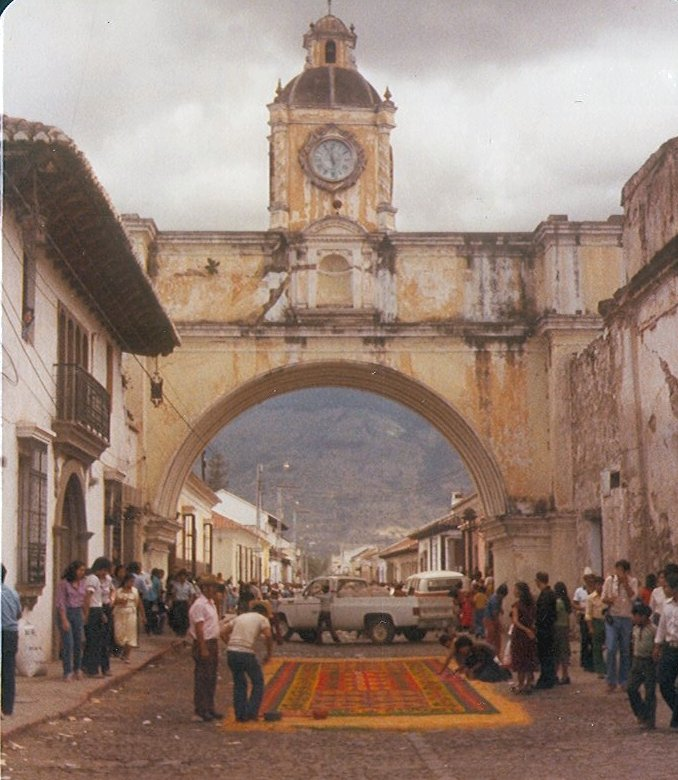
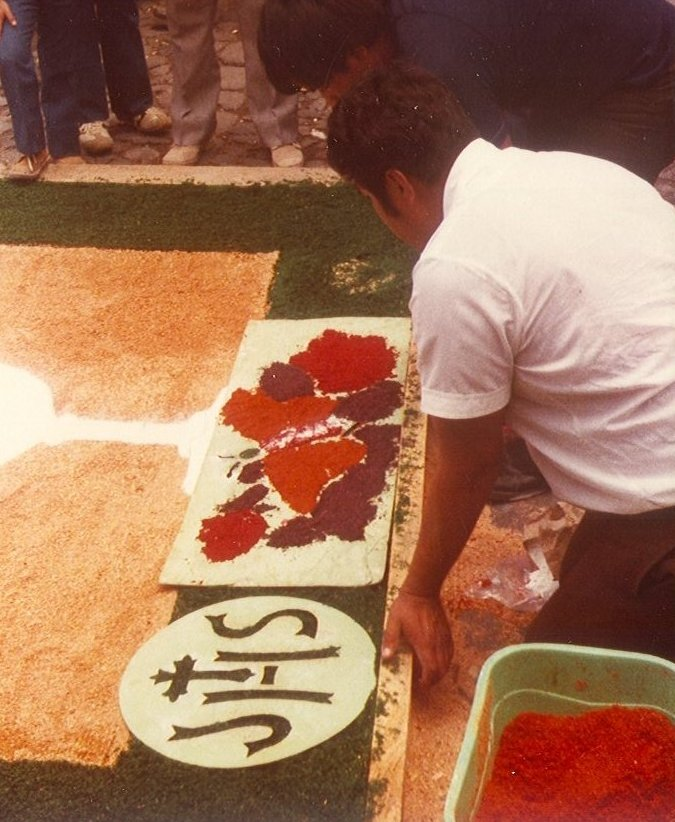
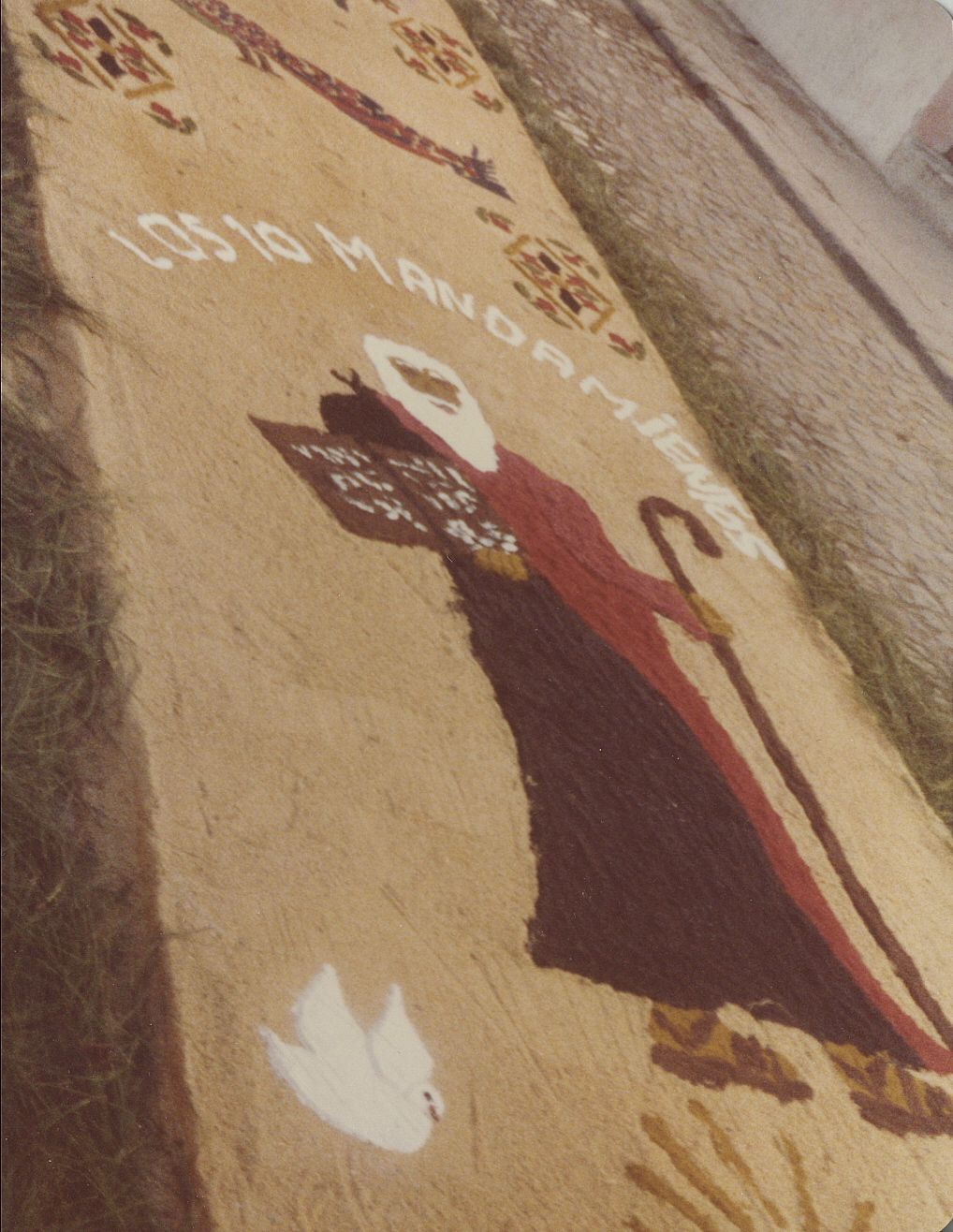

== Processions ==
=== Guatemala City ===
Day	Church	Original religious order since 1829	Current religious order since 1956	Sculpture	Hours	Film
Saturday before Palm Sunday	Iglesia de La Recolección	Propaganda Fide congregation	Franciscans	Jesús Nazareno del Consuelo	10:00 am – 2:00 am	1989 procession
Palm Sunday	Iglesia de Capuchinas	There was no procession.	Secular clergy	Jesús de las Palmas	5:00 am – 12:00 pm	
Palm Sunday	Iglesia de San José	Secular clergy	Secular clergy	Jesús Nazareno de los Milagros	9:00 am – 1:00 am	2014 procession
Holy Monday	Iglesia de La Parroquia	San Felipe Neri Congregation	Clero secular	Jesús Nazareno de las Tres Potencias (Note: Also known as "Jesús Nazareno de los Nobles" in Antigua Guatemala and as "Jesús Nazareno of the poor" in Guatemala city after the earthquakes of 1917-18.)	3:00 pm – 12:00 am	2011 procession
Holy Tuesday	Iglesia de La Merced	Mercedarians	Jesuits	Jesús Nazareno del Perdón	10:00 am – 12:00 pm	
Holy Tuesday	Iglesia de Beatas de Belén			Jesús Nazareno de la Indulgencia	2:00 pm – 12:00 am	
Holy Wednesday	Iglesia de Santa Teresa		Secular clergy	Jesús Nazareno del Rescate	3:00 pm – 12:00 am	1969 procession
Holy Thursday	Iglesia de La Candelaria	Secular clergy	Secular clergy	Jesús Nazareno «Cristo Rey»	7:00 am – 2:00 am	2014 procession
Good Friday	Iglesia de La Merced	Mercedarians	Jesuits	Jesús Nazareno del Perdón	7:00 am – 3:00 pm	1991 procession
Good Friday	Iglesia de La Recolección	Congregación de Propaganda Fide	Franciscans	Señor Sepultado de La Recolección	4:00 pm – 2:00 am	2014 procession
Good Friday	Iglesia de El Calvario	Secular clergy	Secular clergy		Señor Sepultado de El Calvario4:00 pm – 3:00 am	2011 crucifixion
Good Friday	Iglesia de Santo Domingo	Order of Preachers	Order of Preachers (Note: The Order of Preachers returned to Guatemala in 1956.)	Cristo del Amor	4:00 pm – 2:00 am	2014 procession

=== Antigua Guatemala ===
Day	Sculpture	Church	Hours
Fifth Sunday of Lent	Jesús de la Caída	San Bartolomé Becerra	7:00 am – 10:00 pm
Friday before Holy Week	Hermano Pedro Viacrucis (male only)	San Francisco el Grande	3:00 pm – 6:00 pm
Palm Sunday	Palm procession	Iglesia de Jocotenango Sacatepéquez	6:30 am – 12:00 pm
Palm Sunday	Palm procession (live)	Iglesia de La Merced, Iglesia de Santa Ana, Iglesia Escuela de Cristo, Iglesia de San Felipe de Jesús	8:00 am – 12:00 pm
Palm Sunday	Jesús Nazareno de la Reseña	La Merced	11:00 am – 11:00 pm
Holy Monday	Jesús Nazareno	Santa Inés del Monte Pulciano	N/A
Holy Tuesday	Jesús Nazareno del Silencio	El Calvario	4:00 pm – 11:00 pm
Holy Wednesday	Jesús Nazareno del Milagro	San Felipe de Jesús	2:50 pm – 10:00 pm
Holy Wednesday	Jesús Nazareno	San Mateo Milpas Altas	4:00 pm – 10:00 pm
Holy Thursday	Jesús Nazareno de la Humildad	San Cristóbal el Bajo	11:00 am – 10:00 pm
Holy Thursday	Jesús Nazareno del Perdón	San Francisco el Grande	1:00 pm 12:00 am
Good Friday	Jesús Nazareno de la Penitencia	La Merced	4:00 am – 3:00 pm
Good Friday	Acto de Crucifixión	Parroquia de San José Catedral, Escuela de Cristo	12:00 pm – 3:00 pm
Good Friday	Señor Sepultado y Virgen de Soledad	Parroquia de San José Catedral	3:00 pm – 1:00 am
Good Friday	Señor Sepultado	San Felipe de Jesús	3:00 pm – 1:00 am
Good Friday	Señor Sepultado	Escuela de Cristo	4:00 pm – 1:00 am

== See also ==
- Antigua Guatemala
- Guatemala City
- Sólo de noche vienes

General:

- Public holidays in Guatemala
- Chivarreto boxing- a sports tournament held annually on good Friday near Guatemala City

== Notes and references ==
=== Bibliography ===
- Asamblea Constituyente (1945). Constitución política de la República de Guatemala (PDF) (Report) (in Spanish). Guatemala: Asamblea Nacional Constituyente.
- Asamblea Constituyente (1956). Constitución de la República de Guatemala (PDF) (Report) (in Spanish). Guatemala: Asamblea Nacional Constituyente.
- Asociación de Amigos del País (2004). Diccionario Histórico-Biográfico de Guatemala (in Spanish). Guatemala: Amigos del País.
- Aycinena, Pedro de (1854). Concordato entre la Santa Sede y el presidente de la República de Guatemala (in Latin and Spanish). Guatemala: Imprenta La Paz.
- Esquipulas online (n.d.). "Biografia de Mariano Rossell Arellano". Esquipulas en línea. Esquipulas, Guatemala. Archived from the original on 20 December 2013.
- González Davison, Fernando (2008). La montaña infinita; Carrera, caudillo de Guatemala (in Spanish). Guatemala: Artemis y Edinter. ISBN 978-84-89452-81-7.
- Martínez Peláez, Severo (1990). La patrio del criollo; ensayo de interpretación de la realidad colonial guatemalteca (in Spanish). México, D. F.: Ediciones en Marcha.
- Melchor Toledo, Johann Estuardo (2011). "El arte religioso de la Antigua Guatemala, 1773-1821; crónica de la emigración de sus imágenes" (PDF). Tesis doctoral en Historia del Arte (in Spanish). México, D. F.: Universidad Nacional Autónoma de México. Archived from the original (PDF) on 17 December 2014.
- Periodismo Católico (2011). "Los tres viajes de Juan Pablo II dejaron paz y esperanza". Prensa Libre (in Spanish). Guatemala. Archived from the original on 25 December 2014.
- Rodríguez Pedrazuela, Antonio (1999). Un mar sin orillas. Madrid: Rialp.
- Rossell y Arellano, Mariano (1954). Declaración contra la demagogia comunista y liberal. La Iglesia no busca privilegios (in Spanish). Guatemala: Arzobispado de Guatemala.
- Sabino, Carlos (2007). Guatemala, la historia silenciada (1944-1989) Tomo 1: Revolución y Liberación. Guatemala: Fondo de Cultura Económica.
- Semana Santa en Línea (n.d.). "Crónicas y recuerdos de Jesús Nazareno de Candelaria, 1891-1900". Semana Santa en Línea (in Spanish). Guatemala. Archived from the original on 2 March 2015.
- Villalobos, Roberto (2009). "Sincretismo guatemalteco" (in Spanish).
