= Manuel Zeceña Diéguez =

Guatemalan film producer and director

- Born: January 12, 1918; Guatemala
- Died: June 9, 1991; Guatemala City, Guatemala
- Other names: M. Zeceña Dieguez
- Occupation(s): Film producer, director
- Years active: 1954 - 1979

Manuel Zeceña Diéguez (1918-1991) was a Guatemalan film producer, director and writer. As a producer, his work commenced in 1954 with De ranchero a empresario. In the early 1960s he produced Pecado, Paloma herida and Me ha gustado un hombre. As a director he worked on Amor en las nubes which was released in 1968, El deseo llega de noche in 1969, Mi mesera in 1973 and the ill-fated The Hughes Mystery which was released in 1979. The majority of his films were made in Mexico and he worked with prominent Mexican actors and filmmakers.

== Career ==
=== 1950s–1960s ===
As a writer he wrote the script for the 1954 comedy film Sindicato de telemirones which was directed by René Cardona. He produced the film De ranchero a empresario which was released in 1954. For the film Pecado starring Jorge Mistral, Teresa Velázquez and Martha Elena Cervantes, he was both writer and producer. It was released around 1962. He was asked to produce the film Paloma herida which was a joint Mexican/Guatemalan production, released in 1963. It was directed by Emilio Fernandez with cinematography by Raúl Martínez Solares, and starred Patricia Conde, Emilio Fernandez and Andrés Soler. In the late 1960s he worked on Amor en las nubes (English title Love in the Clouds) which was produced by Panamerican Films and distributed by Peliculas Nacionales. The film, which was released in 1968, featured Leonorilda Ochoa, Eric del Castillo and Norma Mora.

=== 1970s ===
He directed the 1970 film Una mujer para los sábados which starred Julio Alemán, Tere Velázquez and Amadee Chabot. His last film in the 1970s seems to be The Hughes Mystery which starred Jackson Bostwick, Broderick Crawford, José Ferrer, Hope Holiday, Guy Madison and Cameron Mitchell. The production company was S.A. Filmadora Panamericana. It was finished by 1979 and released that year. According to the book The Complete Films of Broderick Crawford by Ralph Schiller, there seems to be a mystery as to what happened to the film; it was never released in the United States and nobody seems to have seen it. There was an indication that it was sold in Australia. After that film Zeceña Diéguez appears to have stopped working.

== Death ==
Zeceña Diéguez died in Guatemala on June 9, 1991, aged 73.

== Filmography ==
Films
Title	Role	Year	Notes #
Sindicato de telemirones	Writer	1954	
De ranchero a empresario	Producer, writer	1954	
Pecado	Producer, writer	1962	
Paloma herida	Producer	1963	
Me ha gustado un hombre	Producer	1965	
Alma llanera	Producer	1965	
Solo de noche vienes	Producer, writer	1966	
Amor en las nubes	Director, producer, writer	1968	
El deseo llega de noche	Director	1969	
Una mujer para los sabados	Director, producer, writer	1970	
Tápame contigo	Director, producer	1970	
Ave sin nido	Director, producer, writer	1971	
Mi mesera	Director	1973	
Renzo, el gitano	Director, producer	1973	
Detras de esa puerta	Director, producer, writer	1975	
The Hughes Mystery	Director, producer	1979	
