= San Bartolomé Milpas Altas =

- Municipality
- Location within Guatemala
- Coordinates: 14°36′26″N 90°40′41″W
- Country: Guatemala
- Department: Sacatepéquez
- Foundation: Unknown

Government
  - Type: Municipality
  - Mayor (2016-2020): Rosalío Aspuac Martínez (LIDER)

Area
  - Municipality: 5.18 km^{2} (2.00 sq mi)
  - Urban: 5.18 km^{2} (2.00 sq mi)
- Elevation: 2,090 m (6,860 ft)

Population (2018 census)
  - Municipality: 7,816
  - Density: 1,510/km^{2} (3,910/sq mi)
  - Urban: 7,816
- Time zone: UTC-6 (Central America)
- Climate: Cwb

San Bartolomé Milpas Altas is a town and municipality in the Guatemalan department of Sacatepéquez.

== History ==
In the 1540s, bishop Francisco Marroquín split the ecclesiastical administration of the central valley of Guatemala between the Order of Preachers and the Franciscans, assigning Sumpango's curato to the former. In 1638, the Dominicans separated their large doctrines in groups revolving around six convents:

Order of Preachers convents and doctrines in 1638
| Convent | Doctrines or curatos | Convent | Doctrines or curatos |
|---|---|---|---|
| Guatemala | Chimaltenango; Jocotenango; Sumpango; San Juan Sacatepéquez; San Pedro Sacatepéquez; Santiago Sacatepéquez; Rabinal; San Martín Jilotepeque; Escuintla; Milpas Altas; Milpas Bajas; San Lucas Sacatepéquez; Santo Domingo neighborhood | Amatitlán | Amatitlán; Petapa; Mixco; San Cristóbal |
| Guatemala | Chimaltenango; Jocotenango; Sumpango; San Juan Sacatepéquez; San Pedro Sacatepéquez; Santiago Sacatepéquez; Rabinal; San Martín Jilotepeque; Escuintla; Milpas Altas; Milpas Bajas; San Lucas Sacatepéquez; Santo Domingo neighborhood | Verapaz | Cahabón; Cobán; Chamelco; San Cristóbal; Tactic |
| Guatemala | Chimaltenango; Jocotenango; Sumpango; San Juan Sacatepéquez; San Pedro Sacatepéquez; Santiago Sacatepéquez; Rabinal; San Martín Jilotepeque; Escuintla; Milpas Altas; Milpas Bajas; San Lucas Sacatepéquez; Santo Domingo neighborhood | Sonsonate | Nahuizalco; Tacuxcalco |
| San Salvador | Apastepeque; Chontales; Cojutepeque; Cuscatlán; Milpas Bajas; Tonacatepeque | Sacapulas | Sacapulas; Cunén; Nebaj; Santa Cruz; San Andrés Sajcabajá; Zacualpa; Chichicastenango |

Ecclesiastic historian Domingo Juarros wrote that in 1754, by virtue of a royal order of the borbon reforms of king Carlos III all curatos and doctrines of the regular clergy were moved on to the secular clergy.

== Climate ==
San Bartolomé Milpas Altas has temperate climate (Köppen: Cwb).

Climate data for San Bartolomé Milpas Altas
| Month | Jan | Feb | Mar | Apr | May | Jun | Jul | Aug | Sep | Oct | Nov | Dec | Year |
|---|---|---|---|---|---|---|---|---|---|---|---|---|---|
| Mean daily maximum °C (°F) | 19.5 (67.1) | 20.6 (69.1) | 21.9 (71.4) | 22.8 (73.0) | 21.9 (71.4) | 20.4 (68.7) | 20.4 (68.7) | 21.0 (69.8) | 20.2 (68.4) | 19.7 (67.5) | 19.6 (67.3) | 19.6 (67.3) | 20.6 (69.1) |
| Daily mean °C (°F) | 14.1 (57.4) | 14.8 (58.6) | 15.9 (60.6) | 17.0 (62.6) | 17.1 (62.8) | 16.5 (61.7) | 16.2 (61.2) | 16.4 (61.5) | 16.0 (60.8) | 15.6 (60.1) | 14.8 (58.6) | 14.3 (57.7) | 15.7 (60.3) |
| Mean daily minimum °C (°F) | 8.7 (47.7) | 9.0 (48.2) | 10.0 (50.0) | 11.3 (52.3) | 12.3 (54.1) | 12.6 (54.7) | 12.1 (53.8) | 11.8 (53.2) | 11.9 (53.4) | 11.5 (52.7) | 10.1 (50.2) | 9.1 (48.4) | 10.9 (51.6) |
| Average precipitation mm (inches) | 7 (0.3) | 6 (0.2) | 7 (0.3) | 42 (1.7) | 140 (5.5) | 301 (11.9) | 233 (9.2) | 212 (8.3) | 277 (10.9) | 154 (6.1) | 39 (1.5) | 11 (0.4) | 1,429 (56.3) |
Source: Climate-Data.org

== See also ==
- List of places in Guatemala

== Notes and references ==
=== Bibliography ===
- Belaubre, Christopohe (2001). "Poder y redes sociales en Centroamérica: el caso de la Orden de los Dominicos (1757-1829)" (PDF). Mesoamérica (in Spanish). 41. Archived from the original (PDF) on 21 January 2015.
- Cortés y Larraz, Pedro (2001) [1770]. García, Jesús María; Blasco, Julio Martín (eds.). Descripción Geográfico-Moral de la Diócesis de Goathemala. Corpus Hispanorum de Pace. Segunda Serie (in Spanish). Consejo Superior de Investigaciones Científicas. ISBN 9788400080013. ISSN 0589-8056.
- Escalante Herrera, Marco Antonio (2007). "Breve información del municipio de San Bartolomé Milpas Altas". Pbase (in Spanish). Guatemala. Archived from the original on July 10, 2010.
- Fuentes y Guzmán, Francisco Antonio de (1883) [1690]. Zaragoza, Justo; Navarro, Luis (eds.). Recordación Florida. Discurso historial y demostración natural, material, militar y política del Reyno de Guatemala (in Spanish). Vol. II. Madrid, Spain: Central.
- Juarros, Domingo (1818). Compendio de la historia de la Ciudad de Guatemala (in Spanish). Guatemala: Ignacio Beteta.
- van Oss, Adriaan C. (1986). Catholic Colonialism: A Parish History of Guatemala, 1524-1821. Cambridge, UK: Cambridge University Press. ISBN 9780521527125.
