= Santa Lucía Milpas Altas =

- Municipality and town
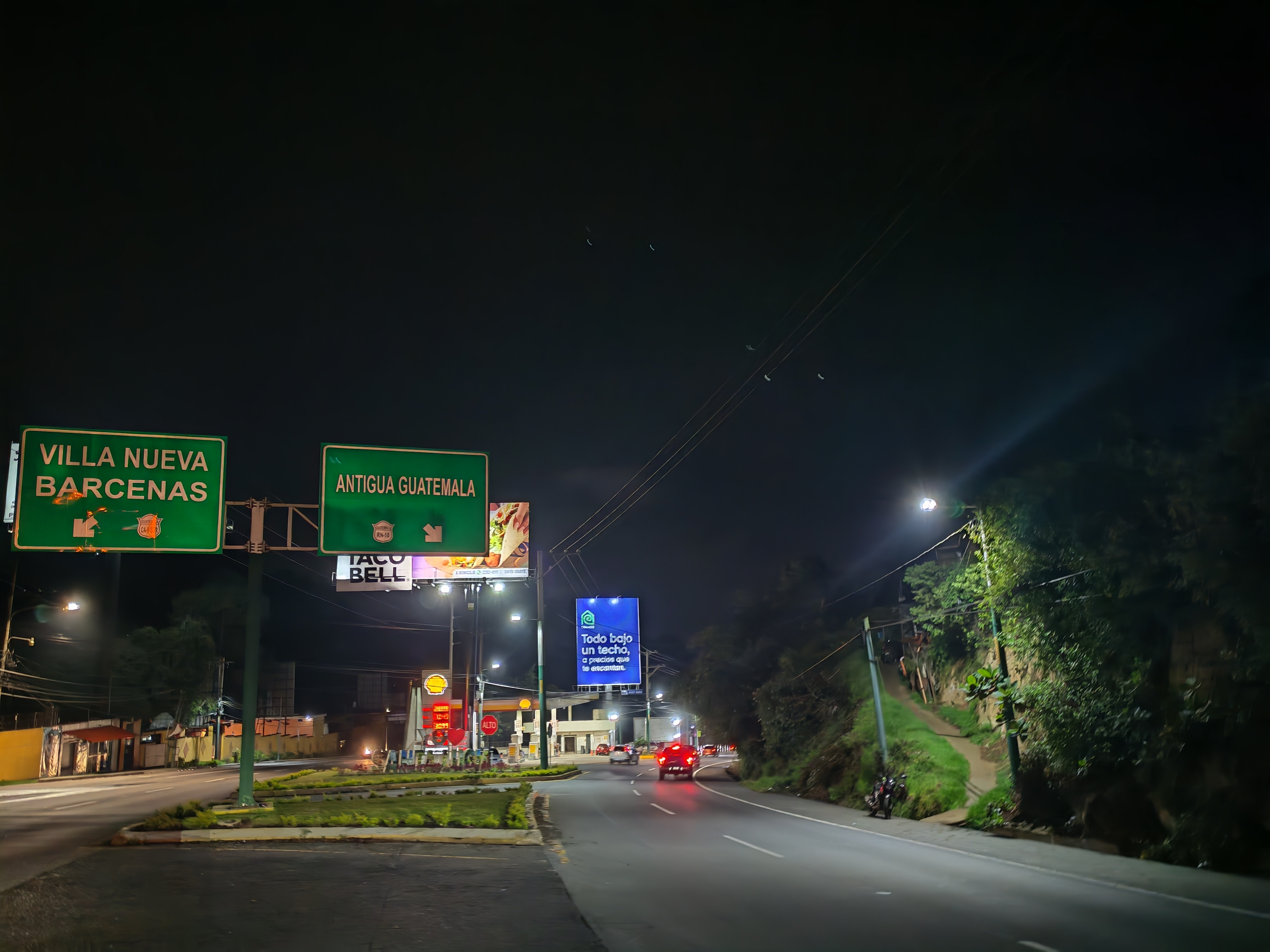
- Santa Lucía Milpas Altas at night

- Location in Guatemala
- Coordinates: 14°35′00″N 90°41′00″W
- Country: Guatemala
- Department: Sacatepéquez Department

Area
  - Total: 7.4 sq mi (19.1 km^{2})

Population (2018 census)
  - Total: 15,570
  - Density: 2,110/sq mi (815/km^{2})
- Climate: Cwb

Santa Lucía Milpas Altas (Spanish pronunciation: [ˈsanta luˈsi.a ˈmilpas ˈaltas]) is a town and municipality in the Guatemalan department of Sacatepéquez. The town has a population of 12,234 (2018 census).

== History ==
In the 1540s, bishop Francisco Marroquín split the ecclesiastical administration of the central valley of Guatemala between the Order of Preachers and the Franciscans, assigning Sumpango's curato to the former. In 1638, the Dominicans separated their large doctrines in groups revolving around six convents:

Order of Preachers convents and doctrines in 1638
Convent	Doctrines or curatos	Convent	Doctrines or curatos
Guatemala	Chimaltenango; Jocotenango; Sumpango; San Juan Sacatepéquez; San Pedro Sacatepéquez; Santiago Sacatepéquez; Rabinal; San Martín Jilotepeque; Escuintla; Milpas Altas; Milpas Bajas; San Lucas Sacatepéquez; Santo Domingo neighborhood	Amatitlán	Amatitlán; Petapa; Mixco; San Cristóbal
Guatemala	Chimaltenango; Jocotenango; Sumpango; San Juan Sacatepéquez; San Pedro Sacatepéquez; Santiago Sacatepéquez; Rabinal; San Martín Jilotepeque; Escuintla; Milpas Altas; Milpas Bajas; San Lucas Sacatepéquez; Santo Domingo neighborhood	Verapaz	Cahabón; Cobán; Chamelco; San Cristóbal; Tactic
Guatemala	Chimaltenango; Jocotenango; Sumpango; San Juan Sacatepéquez; San Pedro Sacatepéquez; Santiago Sacatepéquez; Rabinal; San Martín Jilotepeque; Escuintla; Milpas Altas; Milpas Bajas; San Lucas Sacatepéquez; Santo Domingo neighborhood	Sonsonate	Nahuizalco; Tacuxcalco
San Salvador	Apastepeque; Chontales; Cojutepeque; Cuscatlán; Milpas Bajas; Tonacatepeque	Sacapulas	Sacapulas; Cunén; Nebaj; Santa Cruz; San Andrés Sajcabajá; Zacualpa; Chichicastenango

Ecclesiastic historian Domingo Juarros wrote that in 1754, by virtue of a royal order of the borbon reforms of king Carlos III all curatos and doctrines of the regular clergy were moved on to the secular clergy.

== Climate ==
Santa Lucía Milpas Altas has a subtropical highland climate (Köppen climate classification: Cwb).

Climate data for Santa Lucía Milpas Altas
Month	Jan	Feb	Mar	Apr	May	Jun	Jul	Aug	Sep	Oct	Nov	Dec	Year
Mean daily maximum °C (°F)	20.6 (69.1)	21.7 (71.1)	23.1 (73.6)	24.0 (75.2)	22.9 (73.2)	21.3 (70.3)	21.4 (70.5)	22.0 (71.6)	21.3 (70.3)	20.7 (69.3)	20.6 (69.1)	20.7 (69.3)	21.7 (71.1)
Daily mean °C (°F)	15.0 (59.0)	15.7 (60.3)	16.9 (62.4)	18.1 (64.6)	17.9 (64.2)	17.3 (63.1)	17.1 (62.8)	17.3 (63.1)	17.0 (62.6)	16.5 (61.7)	15.7 (60.3)	15.3 (59.5)	16.7 (62.0)
Mean daily minimum °C (°F)	9.4 (48.9)	9.8 (49.6)	10.8 (51.4)	12.2 (54.0)	12.9 (55.2)	13.3 (55.9)	12.8 (55.0)	12.6 (54.7)	12.7 (54.9)	12.3 (54.1)	10.9 (51.6)	9.9 (49.8)	11.6 (52.9)
Average precipitation mm (inches)	5 (0.2)	5 (0.2)	5 (0.2)	37 (1.5)	131 (5.2)	281 (11.1)	223 (8.8)	187 (7.4)	259 (10.2)	146 (5.7)	32 (1.3)	9 (0.4)	1,320 (52.2)
Source: Climate-Data.org

== Geographic location ==
This municipality is 9 km from Antigua Guatemala.

== See also ==
- List of places in Guatemala

== Notes and references ==
=== Bibliography ===
- Belaubre, Christopohe (2001). "Poder y redes sociales en Centroamérica: el caso de la Orden de los Dominicos (1757-1829)" (PDF). Mesoamérica (in Spanish). 41. Archived from the original (PDF) on 21 January 2015.
- Escalante Herrera, Marco Antonio (2007). "Breve información de Santa Lucía Milpas Alta". pbase.com (in Spanish). Guatemala. Archived from the original on June 20, 2010.
- Juarros, Domingo (1818). Compendio de la historia de la Ciudad de Guatemala (in Spanish). Guatemala: Ignacio Beteta.
