= Santiago Sacatepéquez =

- Municipality
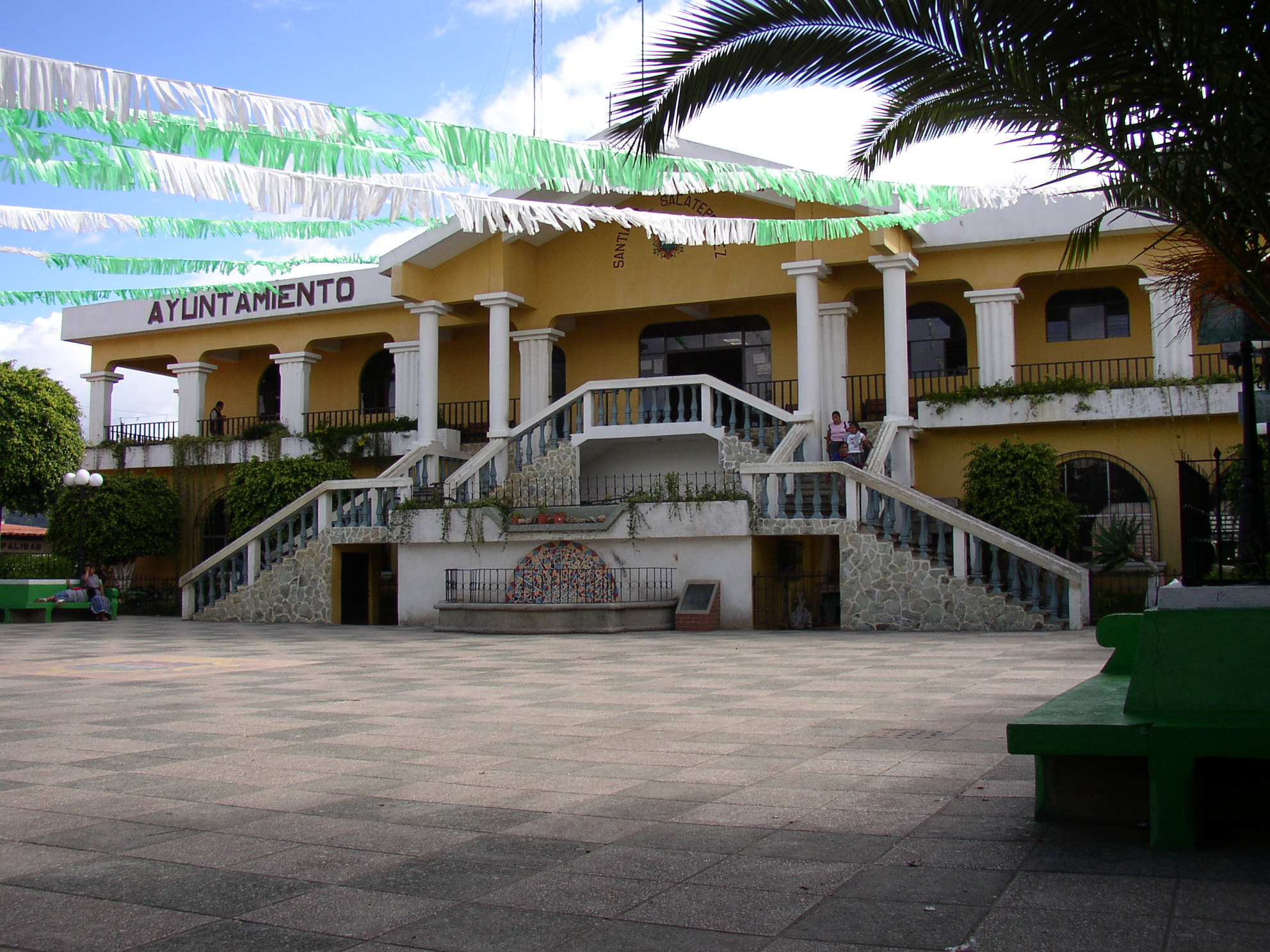
- Townhall of Santiago Sacatépéquez

- Location in Guatemala
- Coordinates: 14°39′11″N 90°39′09″W
- Country: Guatemala
- Department: Sacatepéquez Department

Government
  - Mayor (2016-2020): Juan Carlos Barrios Rodríguez (Convergencia Social Santiago)

Area
  - Total: 13.9 sq mi (36.1 km^{2})
- Elevation: 6,690 ft (2,040 m)

Population (2018 census)
  - Total: 29,238
  - Density: 2,100/sq mi (810/km^{2})
- Climate: Cwb

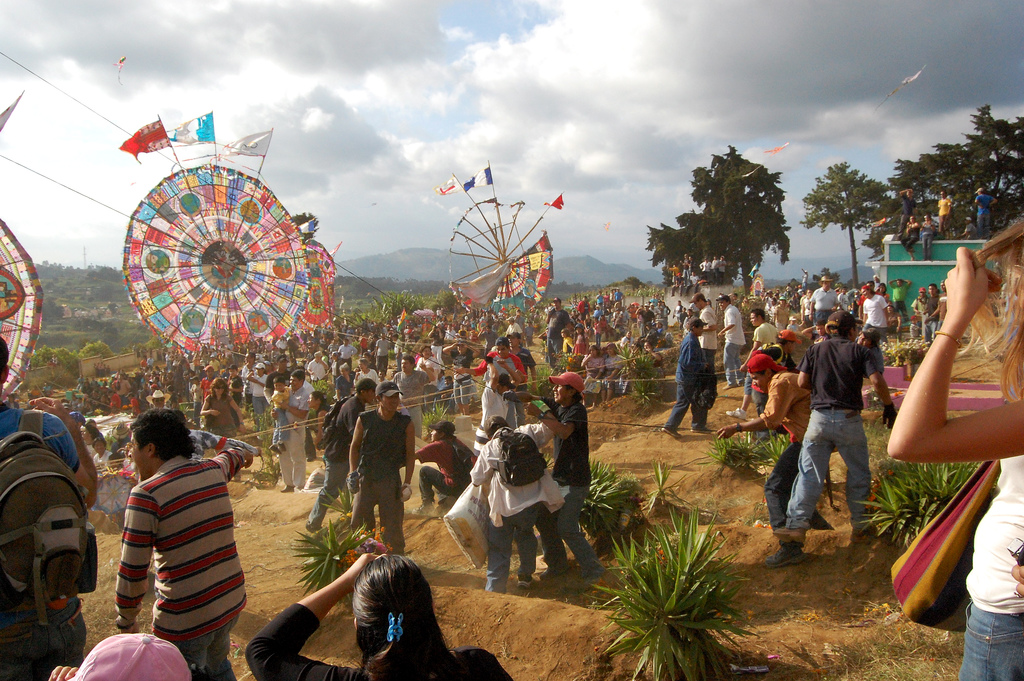
Santiago Sacatepéquez kite festival, 2007

Santiago Sacatepéquez (Spanish pronunciation: [sanˈtjaɣo sakateˈpekes]) is a town, with a population of 24,100 (2018 census), and a municipality in the Guatemalan department of Sacatepéquez. It is well known for a kite festival held here annually on November 1.

== History ==
Santiago Sacatepéquez is located in a valley that the Spanish conquistadores called "de Sacatepéquez" (English: Valle of Sacatepéquez) in the 1520s. That valley was bordered by the valley of Xilotepeque on the West, those of Mixco and las Vacas on the North, and by the Chiquimula province and the South and East. The town was described as a rich town with several hundred families and as having "cold climate" by Irish friar Thomas Gage in his 1648 book about his travels through America in the 1620s and 1630s.

In the 1540s, bishop Francisco Marroquín split the ecclesiastical administration of the central valley of Guatemala between the Order of Preachers and the Franciscans, assigning Sumpango's curato to the former. In 1638, the Dominicans separated their large doctrines in groups revolving around six convents:

Order of Preachers convents and doctrines in 1638
Convent	Doctrines or curatos	Convent	Doctrines or curatos
Guatemala	Chimaltenango; Jocotenango; Sumpango; San Juan Sacatepéquez; San Pedro Sacatepéquez; Santiago Sacatepéquez; Rabinal; San Martín Jilotepeque; Escuintla; Milpas Altas; Milpas Bajas; San Lucas Sacatepéquez; Santo Domingo neighborhood	Amatitlán	Amatitlán; Petapa; Mixco; San Cristóbal
Guatemala	Chimaltenango; Jocotenango; Sumpango; San Juan Sacatepéquez; San Pedro Sacatepéquez; Santiago Sacatepéquez; Rabinal; San Martín Jilotepeque; Escuintla; Milpas Altas; Milpas Bajas; San Lucas Sacatepéquez; Santo Domingo neighborhood	Verapaz	Cahabón; Cobán; Chamelco; San Cristóbal; Tactic
Guatemala	Chimaltenango; Jocotenango; Sumpango; San Juan Sacatepéquez; San Pedro Sacatepéquez; Santiago Sacatepéquez; Rabinal; San Martín Jilotepeque; Escuintla; Milpas Altas; Milpas Bajas; San Lucas Sacatepéquez; Santo Domingo neighborhood	Sonsonate	Nahuizalco; Tacuxcalco
San Salvador	Apastepeque; Chontales; Cojutepeque; Cuscatlán; Milpas Bajas; Tonacatepeque	Sacapulas	Sacapulas; Cunén; Nebaj; Santa Cruz; San Andrés Sajcabajá; Zacualpa; Chichicastenango

Ecclesiastic historian Domingo Juarros wrote that in 1754, by virtue of a royal order of the borbon reforms of king Carlos III all curatos and doctrines of the regular clergy were moved on to the secular clergy. Also, in 1766 the Chimaltenango and Sacatepéquez municipalities tried to join, but it did not work out and they remained split until after independence from Spain in 1821.

== Education ==
Education percentages
Level	Male	Female
Preschool	52.2 %	51.7 %
Elementary	93.1 %	93.5 %
Junior high	33.9 %	28.0 %
High school	1.6 %	1.2 %

Illiteracy by gender
Male	Female
89.8%	73.8%

Illiteracy human settlements (Note: Illiterary percentage for people older than 15 years old is 28% with a population of 5274 people younger than 15 year.)
Urban population	Rural population
25%	53%

== Climate ==
Santiago Sacatepéquez has a subtropical highland climate (Köppen: Cwb).

Climate data for Santiago Sacatepéquez
Month	Jan	Feb	Mar	Apr	May	Jun	Jul	Aug	Sep	Oct	Nov	Dec	Year
Mean daily maximum °C (°F)	20.2 (68.4)	21.4 (70.5)	22.7 (72.9)	23.5 (74.3)	22.5 (72.5)	21.0 (69.8)	21.0 (69.8)	21.6 (70.9)	20.9 (69.6)	20.3 (68.5)	20.3 (68.5)	20.3 (68.5)	21.3 (70.4)
Daily mean °C (°F)	14.7 (58.5)	15.5 (59.9)	16.6 (61.9)	17.7 (63.9)	17.5 (63.5)	17.0 (62.6)	16.7 (62.1)	16.9 (62.4)	16.6 (61.9)	16.0 (60.8)	15.4 (59.7)	14.9 (58.8)	16.3 (61.3)
Mean daily minimum °C (°F)	9.2 (48.6)	9.6 (49.3)	10.5 (50.9)	11.9 (53.4)	12.6 (54.7)	13.0 (55.4)	12.5 (54.5)	12.3 (54.1)	12.4 (54.3)	11.8 (53.2)	10.6 (51.1)	9.6 (49.3)	11.3 (52.4)
Average precipitation mm (inches)	7 (0.3)	5 (0.2)	5 (0.2)	39 (1.5)	132 (5.2)	290 (11.4)	231 (9.1)	204 (8.0)	268 (10.6)	146 (5.7)	37 (1.5)	9 (0.4)	1,373 (54.1)
Source: Climate-Data.org

== Geographic location ==
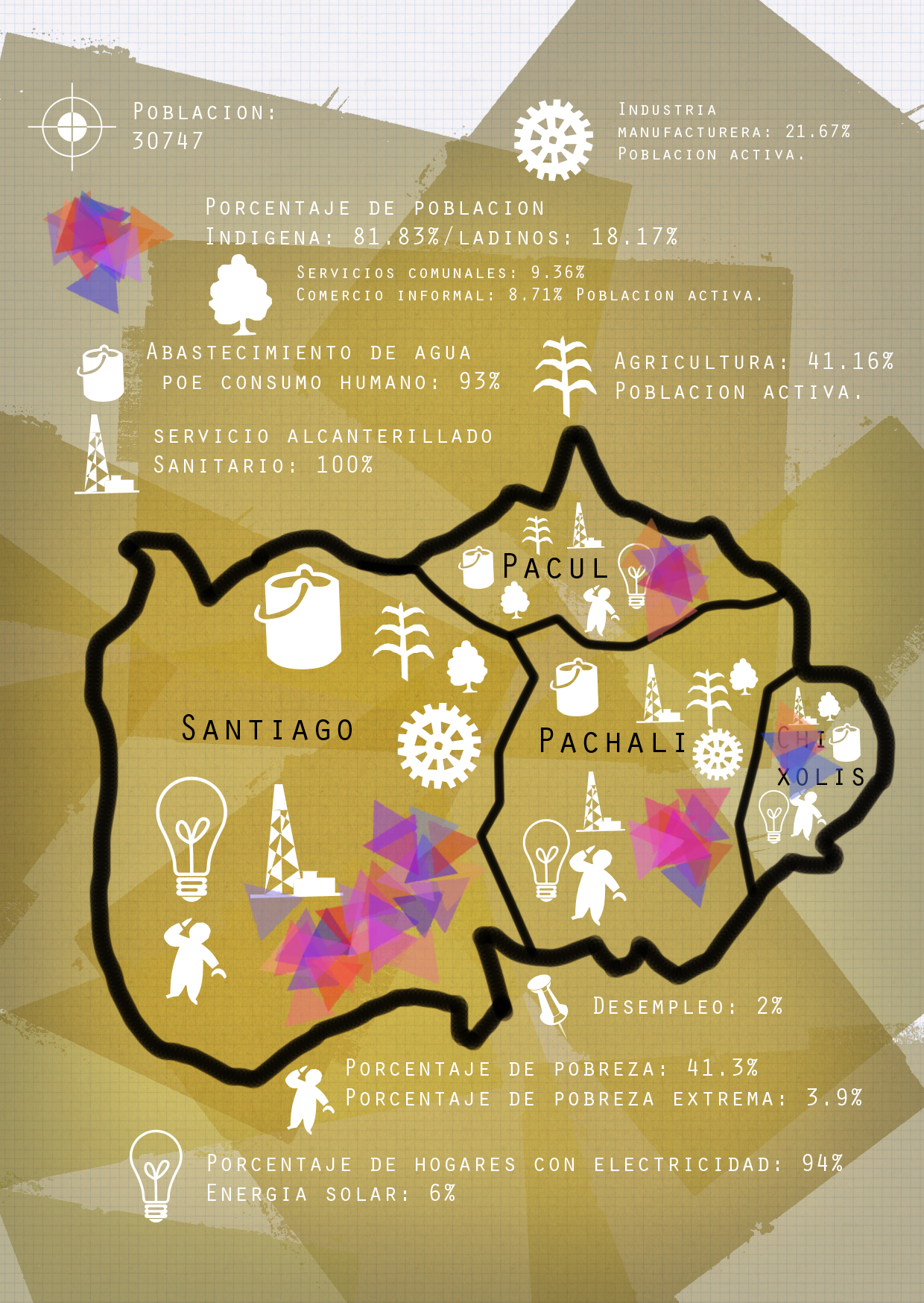
Santiago Sacatepéquez qualitative map.

== See also ==
- Chajoma
- La Aurora International Airport

== Notes and references ==
=== Bibliography ===
- Belaubre, Christopohe (2001). "Poder y redes sociales en Centroamérica: el caso de la Orden de los Dominicos (1757-1829)" (PDF). Mesoamérica (in Spanish). 41. Archived from the original (PDF) on 21 January 2015.
- Gage, Thomas (2014) [1648]. A. P. Newton (ed.). The English-American: A New Survey of the West Indies. Routledge. p. 472. ISBN 9781134285143.
- Juarros, Domingo (1818). Compendio de la historia de la Ciudad de Guatemala (in Spanish). Guatemala: Ignacio Beteta.
