= Sacatepéquez Department =

Department of Guatemala

Coordinates: 14°33′24″N 90°44′02″W

Sacatepéquez Department Departmento de Sacatepéquez
- Department of Guatemala
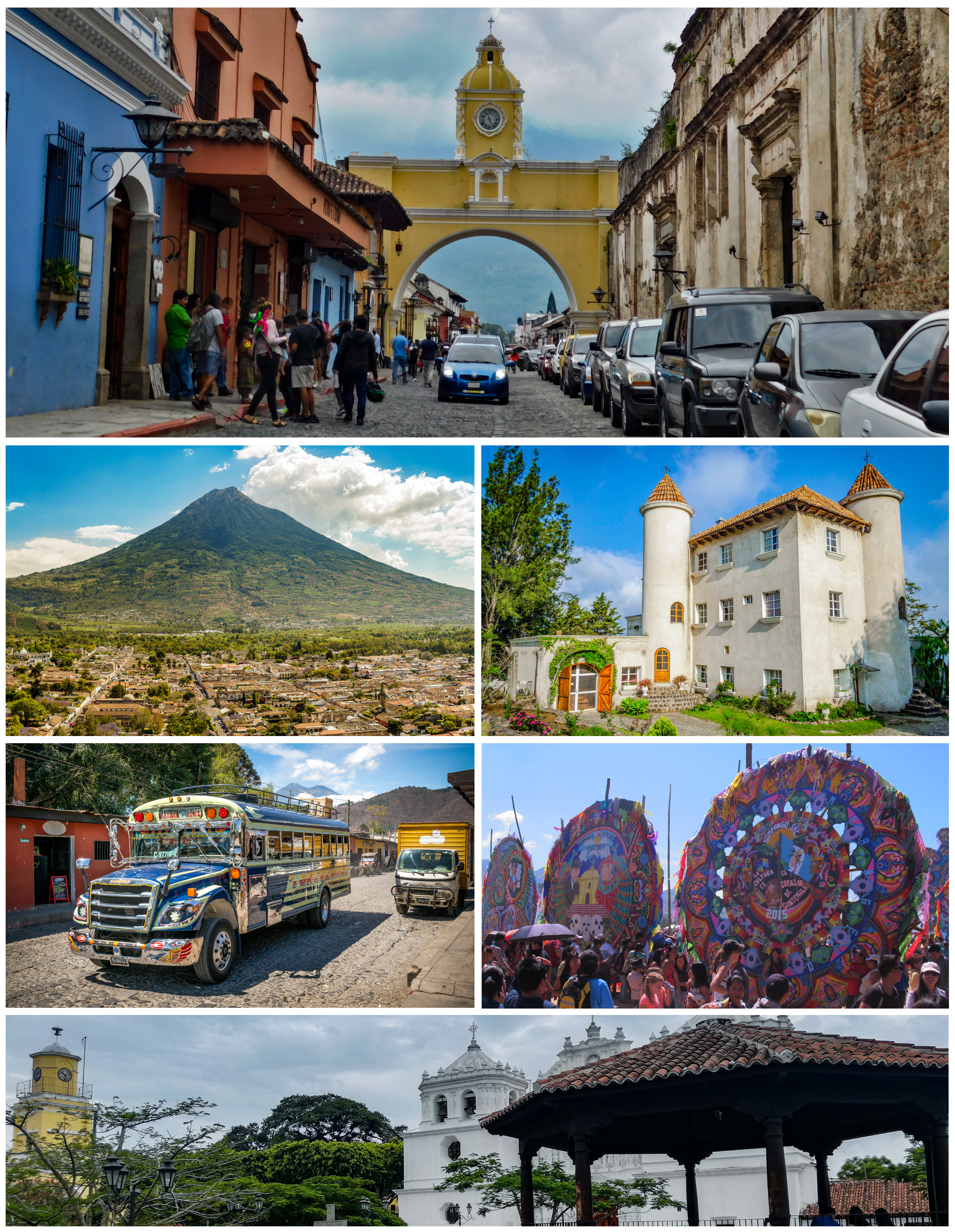
- From top to bottom, from left to right: Arch of Santa Catalina, Water Volcano, Defay Castle, Traditional Chicken Bus, Sumpango giant kites and Central Plaza of the Old City.

- Flag Coat of arms

- Sacatepéquez in Guatemala
- Country: Guatemala
- Capital and largest city: Antigua
- Municipalities: 16

Government
  - Type: Departmental

Area
  - Department of Guatemala: 465 km^{2} (180 sq mi)

Population (2018)
  - Department of Guatemala: 330,469
  - Density: 711/km^{2} (1,840/sq mi)
  - Urban: 292,366
  - Religions: Roman Catholicism Evangelicalism Maya
- Time zone: UTC-6

Sacatepéquez (Spanish pronunciation: [sakateˈpekes]) is one of the 22 departments of Guatemala. The name comes from Sacatepéquez, a city from 21 November 1542, until 29 July 1773, when it was destroyed by the 1773 Guatemala earthquake.

The capital of the department is Antigua Guatemala. Other important cities include Ciudad Vieja and San Lucas Sacatepéquez, which also hosts a marketplace and is a culinary attraction. The Chajoma were a group of indigenous people who were Kaqchikel speaking Maya, they identified Mixco Viejo as their capital, and spread throughout the Sacatepequez Department until their capital was moved to Ciudad Vieja, in Antigua.

== Name ==
The name Sacatepéquez is derived from a Nahuatl word which means "grasshill", referring to the hilly terrain in the department.

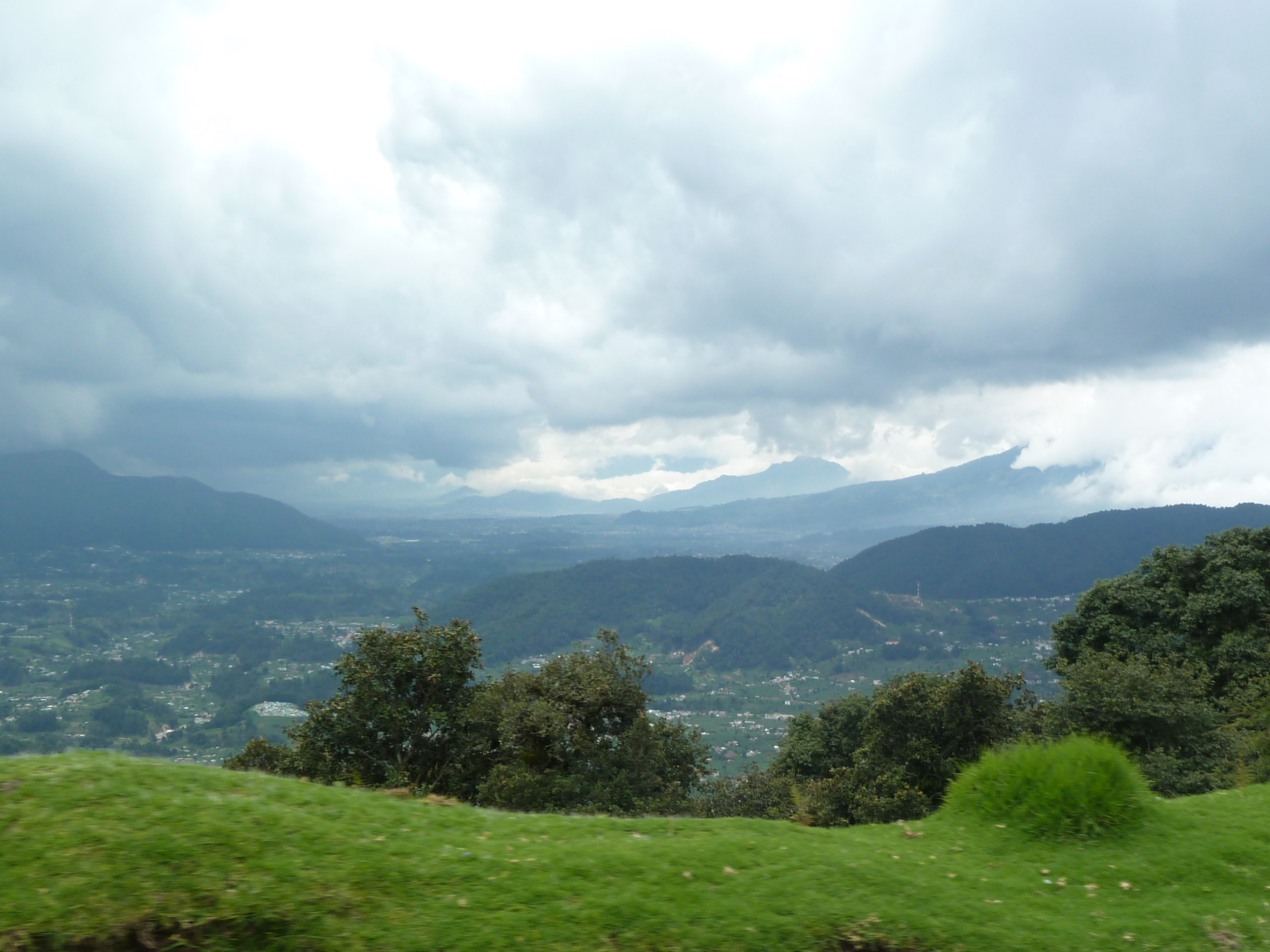
The hilly terrain of Guatemala gave rise to the name Sacatepéquez

It has also been spelled Zacatepeques.

== Geography ==
The area is mountainous, with what the British described, in 1850, as a "mild climate." Guatemala hosts a chain of active and dormant volcanoes, with those in Sacatepequez including Acatenango, Volcán de Agua (Volcano of Water), and Volcán de Fuego (Volcano of Fire). Jocotes, a fruit of the cashew family, grow in the region.

== Population ==
Sacatepéquez Department has a population of 330,469 (2018 census). 40.2% of the population identifies as Maya, with 37.7% belonging to the Kaqchikel Maya. In 1850, the area had a population of an estimated 56,000. The southern area, which is closer to Guatemala City, has the largest population.

== Municipalities ==
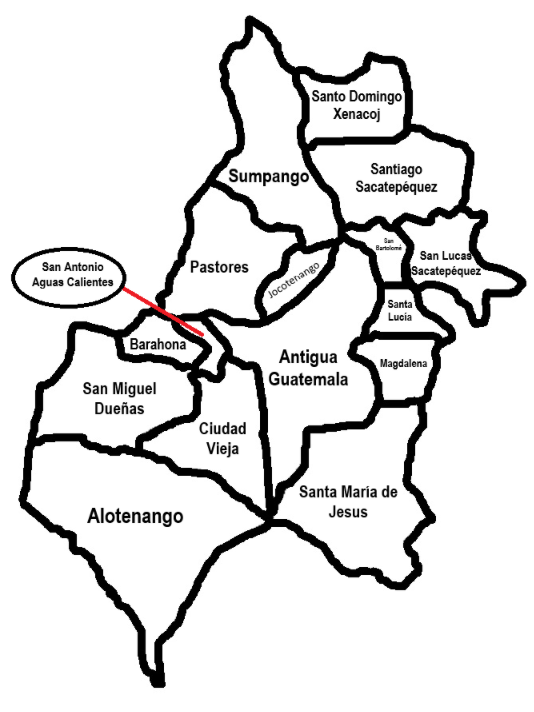
Map of the Municipalities of Sacatepéquez

#	Municipality	Population (2018)	Density (/km²)	Area (km^{2})
1	Antigua	46,054	667/km^{2}	69
2	Sumpango	37,260	601/km^{2}	62
3	Ciudad Vieja	33,405	1,237/km^{2}	27
4	Santiago Sacatepéquez	29,238	812/km^{2}	36
5	San Lucas Sacatepéquez	23,986	959/km^{2}	25
6	Alotenango	23,369	615/km^{2}	38
7	Santa María de Jesús	21,938	954/km^{2}	23
8	Jocotenango	21,657	2,166/km^{2}	10
9	Pastores	17,814	938/km^{2}	19
10	Santa Lucía Milpas Altas	15,570	819/km^{2}	19
11	San Miguel Dueñas	12,696	282/km^{2}	45
12	Santo Domingo Xenacoj	12,402	653/km^{2}	19
14	Magdalena Milpas Altas	11,856	624/km^{2}	19
13	San Antonio Aguas Calientes	11,347	1,621/km^{2}	7
15	San Bartolomé Milpas Altas	7,816	1,563/km^{2}	5
16	Santa Catarina Barahona	4,061	131/km^{2}	31
	Sacatepéquez	330,469	725/km²	454 km^{2}

== Economy ==
The more populated areas produce fruit and various crops, including maize. Livestock is also raised, with trade going towards Guatemala City. The southern area of the department produces coffee, sugar, tobacco, and cotton. As of 1850, products were being shipped out of Iztapa. Although Guatemala is able to produce cash crops such as bananas and textiles, 72% of people living in rural areas live in poverty with 31% of them reaching extreme poverty.

== Culture ==
=== Art ===
Sacatepéquez is also home to the National Museum of Guatemalan Art, which is located in Antigua Guatemala.

== See also ==
- Chajoma
- Guatemalan Highlands
