= Sumpango, Sacatepéquez =

Sumpango
- Municipality
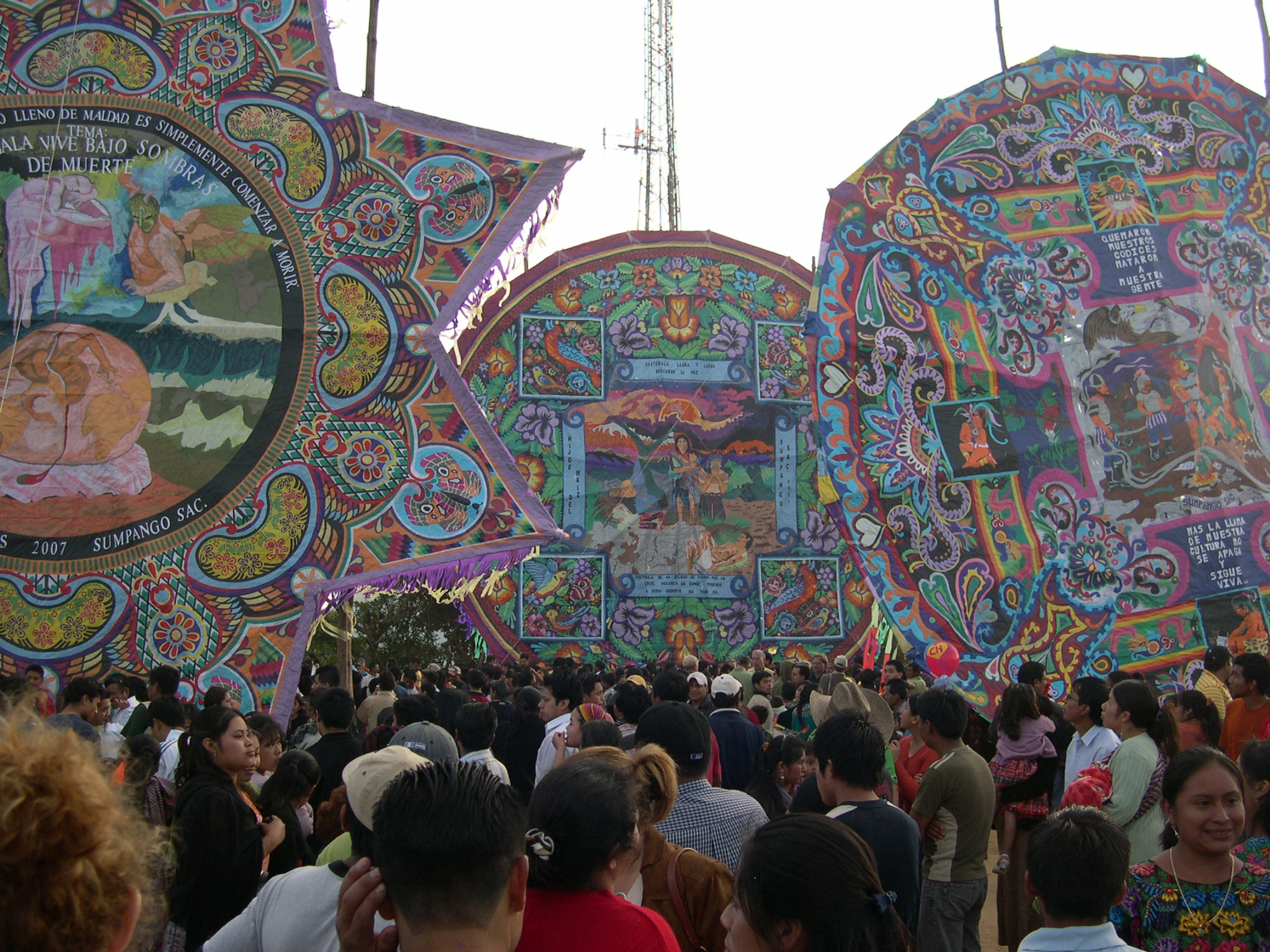
- Sumpango Giant Kite Festival

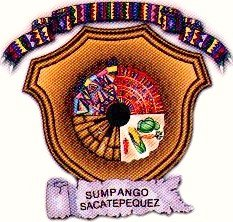
- Coat of arms

- Location in Guatemala
- Coordinates: 14°38′52″N 90°44′05″W
- Country: Guatemala
- Department: Sacatepéquez Department

Area
  - Total: 23.8 sq mi (61.6 km^{2})
- Elevation: 6,200 ft (1,900 m)

Population (2018 census)
  - Total: 37,206
  - Density: 1,560/sq mi (604/km^{2})
- Climate: Cwb

Sumpango is a town, with a population of 28,488 (2018 census), and a municipality in the Guatemalan department of Sacatepéquez.

== History ==
In the 1540s, bishop Francisco Marroquín split the ecclesiastical administration of the central valley of Guatemala between the Order of Preachers and the Franciscans, assigning Sumpango's curato to the former. In 1638, the Dominicans separated their large doctrines in groups revolving around six convents:

Order of Preachers convents and doctrines in 1638
| Convent | Doctrines or curatos | Convent | Doctrines or curatos |
|---|---|---|---|
| Guatemala | Chimaltenango; Jocotenango; Sumpango; San Juan Sacatepéquez; San Pedro Sacatepéquez; Santiago Sacatepéquez; Rabinal; San Martín Jilotepeque; Escuintla; Milpas Altas; Milpas Bajas; San Lucas Sacatepéquez; Santo Domingo neighborhood | Amatitlán | Amatitlán; Petapa; Mixco; San Cristóbal |
| Guatemala | Chimaltenango; Jocotenango; Sumpango; San Juan Sacatepéquez; San Pedro Sacatepéquez; Santiago Sacatepéquez; Rabinal; San Martín Jilotepeque; Escuintla; Milpas Altas; Milpas Bajas; San Lucas Sacatepéquez; Santo Domingo neighborhood | Verapaz | Cahabón; Cobán; Chamelco; San Cristóbal; Tactic |
| Guatemala | Chimaltenango; Jocotenango; Sumpango; San Juan Sacatepéquez; San Pedro Sacatepéquez; Santiago Sacatepéquez; Rabinal; San Martín Jilotepeque; Escuintla; Milpas Altas; Milpas Bajas; San Lucas Sacatepéquez; Santo Domingo neighborhood | Sonsonate | Nahuizalco; Tacuxcalco |
| San Salvador | Apastepeque; Chontales; Cojutepeque; Cuscatlán; Milpas Bajas; Tonacatepeque | Sacapulas | Sacapulas; Cunén; Nebaj; Santa Cruz; San Andrés Sajcabajá; Zacualpa; Chichicastenango |

Ecclesiastic historian Domingo Juarros wrote that in 1754, by virtue of a royal order of the enlightened absolutism of king Carlos III all curatos and doctrines of the regular clergy were moved on to the secular clergy.

== Giant kite festival ==
Sumpango's Festival, also known as the "Giant Kite Festival", is a cultural event that takes place on the first of November each year. On that day, people from the town gather at the football field near the town's cemetery to take part in a giant kite contest. Entrants have typically spent months creating their kites, and participating kites are graded on both creativity and length of flight. This contest has been around for several centuries and is now recognized as a Cultural Good of Guatemala. It was also granted a Cultural Award by then president Óscar Berger Perdomo in the mid 2000s.

== Climate ==
Sumpango has a subtropical highland climate (Köppen climate classification: Cwb).

Climate data for Sumpango
| Month | Jan | Feb | Mar | Apr | May | Jun | Jul | Aug | Sep | Oct | Nov | Dec | Year |
|---|---|---|---|---|---|---|---|---|---|---|---|---|---|
| Mean daily maximum °C (°F) | 21.1 (70.0) | 22.2 (72.0) | 23.7 (74.7) | 24.3 (75.7) | 23.8 (74.8) | 22.1 (71.8) | 22.2 (72.0) | 22.7 (72.9) | 21.9 (71.4) | 21.3 (70.3) | 21.4 (70.5) | 21.2 (70.2) | 22.3 (72.2) |
| Daily mean °C (°F) | 15.2 (59.4) | 15.9 (60.6) | 17.1 (62.8) | 18.2 (64.8) | 18.4 (65.1) | 17.8 (64.0) | 17.5 (63.5) | 17.7 (63.9) | 17.3 (63.1) | 16.7 (62.1) | 16.2 (61.2) | 15.4 (59.7) | 17.0 (62.5) |
| Mean daily minimum °C (°F) | 9.3 (48.7) | 9.7 (49.5) | 10.6 (51.1) | 12.2 (54.0) | 13.0 (55.4) | 13.5 (56.3) | 12.9 (55.2) | 12.7 (54.9) | 12.8 (55.0) | 12.2 (54.0) | 11.0 (51.8) | 9.7 (49.5) | 11.6 (52.9) |
| Average precipitation mm (inches) | 6 (0.2) | 5 (0.2) | 4 (0.2) | 38 (1.5) | 122 (4.8) | 276 (10.9) | 221 (8.7) | 205 (8.1) | 260 (10.2) | 138 (5.4) | 36 (1.4) | 7 (0.3) | 1,318 (51.9) |
Source: Climate-Data.org

== See also ==
- List of places in Guatemala

== Notes and references ==
=== Bibliography ===
- Belaubre, Christopohe (2001). "Poder y redes sociales en Centroamérica: el caso de la Orden de los Dominicos (1757-1829)" (PDF). Mesoamérica (in Spanish). 41. Archived from the original (PDF) on 21 January 2015.
- Juarros, Domingo (1818). Compendio de la historia de la Ciudad de Guatemala (in Spanish). Guatemala: Ignacio Beteta.
- Morales, César (2010). "Historia del baile de la conquista". Iglesia de Ciudad Vieja (in Spanish).
- Wikiguate. "Baile de la Conquista". Wikiguate (in Spanish). Archived from the original on 5 December 2014.
