= Santo Domingo Xenacoj =

- Municipality

- Location in Guatemala
- Coordinates: 14°40′56″N 90°42′24″W
- Country: Guatemala
- Department: Sacatepéquez Department

Area
  - Total: 7.5 sq mi (19.3 km^{2})
- Elevation: 6,010 ft (1,832 m)

Population (2018 census)
  - Total: 12,402
  - Density: 1,660/sq mi (643/km^{2})
- Climate: Cwb

Santo Domingo Xenacoj is a town, with a population of 10,632 (2018 census), and a municipality in the Guatemalan department of Sacatepéquez.

== Name origin ==
The native term Xenacoj has been evolving over the centuries: in 1625, Irish friar Thomas Gage, call it Sinacao; later, friar Francisco Ximenes, O.P. in 1717, calls it Xencoc. In the San Pedro documents is shown as Senacoc and in 1806 was written as Xinacó, in 1880 as Xinacó and, finally, in the early 20th century is written as Xenacoj. The origin of the name comes from the word "Xe" which means under or beneath and Nacoj, which is the name of a hill; therefore, the name Xenacoj means "under the Nacoj hill". Another version claims that instead of Hill, Na means mouth and Coj means lion.

== History ==
Santo Domingo Xenacoj is located in a valley that the Spanish conquistadores called "de Sacatepéquez" (English: Valle of Sacatepéquez) in the 1520s. That valley was bordered by the valley of Xilotepeque on the West, those of Mixco and las Vacas on the North, and by the Chiquimula province and the South and East. The town was described as having "warm climate" by Irish friar Thomas Gage in his 1648 book about his travels through America in the 1620s and 1630s.

Historian Domingo Juarros wrote that in 1766 the Chimaltenango and Sacatepéquez municipalities tried to join, but it did not work out and they remained split until after independence from Spain in 1821.

== Climate ==
Santo Domingo Xenacoj has a subtropical highland climate (Köppen: Cwb).

Climate data for Santo Domingo Xenacoj
Month	Jan	Feb	Mar	Apr	May	Jun	Jul	Aug	Sep	Oct	Nov	Dec	Year
Mean daily maximum °C (°F)	21.5 (70.7)	22.5 (72.5)	24.1 (75.4)	24.6 (76.3)	24.1 (75.4)	22.5 (72.5)	22.6 (72.7)	23.1 (73.6)	22.4 (72.3)	21.6 (70.9)	21.6 (70.9)	21.7 (71.1)	22.7 (72.9)
Daily mean °C (°F)	15.5 (59.9)	16.2 (61.2)	17.4 (63.3)	18.4 (65.1)	18.5 (65.3)	18.0 (64.4)	17.8 (64.0)	17.9 (64.2)	17.7 (63.9)	17.0 (62.6)	16.3 (61.3)	15.8 (60.4)	17.2 (63.0)
Mean daily minimum °C (°F)	9.5 (49.1)	9.9 (49.8)	10.7 (51.3)	12.3 (54.1)	13.0 (55.4)	13.6 (56.5)	13.1 (55.6)	12.8 (55.0)	13.0 (55.4)	12.4 (54.3)	11.1 (52.0)	9.9 (49.8)	11.8 (53.2)
Average precipitation mm (inches)	5 (0.2)	4 (0.2)	3 (0.1)	37 (1.5)	115 (4.5)	262 (10.3)	209 (8.2)	202 (8.0)	253 (10.0)	130 (5.1)	32 (1.3)	6 (0.2)	1,258 (49.6)
Source: Climate-Data.org
