= Magdalena Milpas Altas =

- Municipality and town
- Location in Guatemala
- Coordinates: 14°32′43″N 90°40′31″W
- Country: Guatemala
- Department: Sacatepéquez
- Founded: 1585

Government
  - Type: Municipality
  - Mayor: Juan Martinez Mendez

Area
  - Municipality and town: 19 km^{2} (7.3 sq mi)

Population (2018 census)
  - Municipality and town: 11,856
  - Density: 620/km^{2} (1,600/sq mi)
  - Urban: 7,841
  - Languages: Spanish Quiche Cakchiquel
- Time zone: UTC-6 (Central Time)
- Climate: Cwb

Magdalena Milpas Altas (Spanish pronunciation: [maɣðaˈlena ˈmilpas ˈaltas]) is a town and municipality in the Guatemalan department of Sacatepéquez.

As of the 2018 census, the population of the municipality is 11,856
