= San Miguel Dueñas =

Coordinates: 14°31′N 90°48′W

- Municipality
- Interactive map of San Miguel Dueñas
- Country: Guatemala
- Department: Sacatepéquez

Area
  - Municipality: 45.3 km^{2} (17.5 sq mi)

Population (2018 census)
  - Municipality: 12,696
  - Density: 280/km^{2} (726/sq mi)
  - Urban: 10,892

San Miguel Dueñas is a town and municipality in the Guatemalan department of Sacatepéquez.
