= San Antonio Aguas Calientes =

Coordinates: 14°32′N 90°46′W

- Municipality
- Interactive map of San Antonio Aguas Calientes
- Country: Guatemala
- Department: Sacatepéquez

Area
  - Municipality: 7.01 km^{2} (2.71 sq mi)

Population (2018 census)
  - Municipality: 11,347
  - Density: 1,620/km^{2} (4,190/sq mi)
  - Urban: 9,669

San Antonio Aguas Calientes (Spanish pronunciation: [san anˈtonjo ˈaɣwas kaˈljentes]) is a municipality in the Guatemalan department of Sacatepéquez.

The municipal seat is the town of San Andrés Ceballos which is known for its weavers. Maya women in the area use a backstrap loom to weave traditional patterns. There is a two-story market on the square that sells weavings and other crafts. Several of the women have their looms set up and will demonstrate their skills. There are a couple other stores outside of town that also sell weavings.
