= Pastores =

Municipality of Sacatepéquez Department, Guatemala

Coordinates: 14°36′N 90°45′W

Pastores is a town, with a population of 12,621 (2018 census), and a municipality, with a population of 17,814 (2018 census), in the Guatemalan department of Sacatepéquez.
