= San Juan Sacatepéquez =

- Municipality
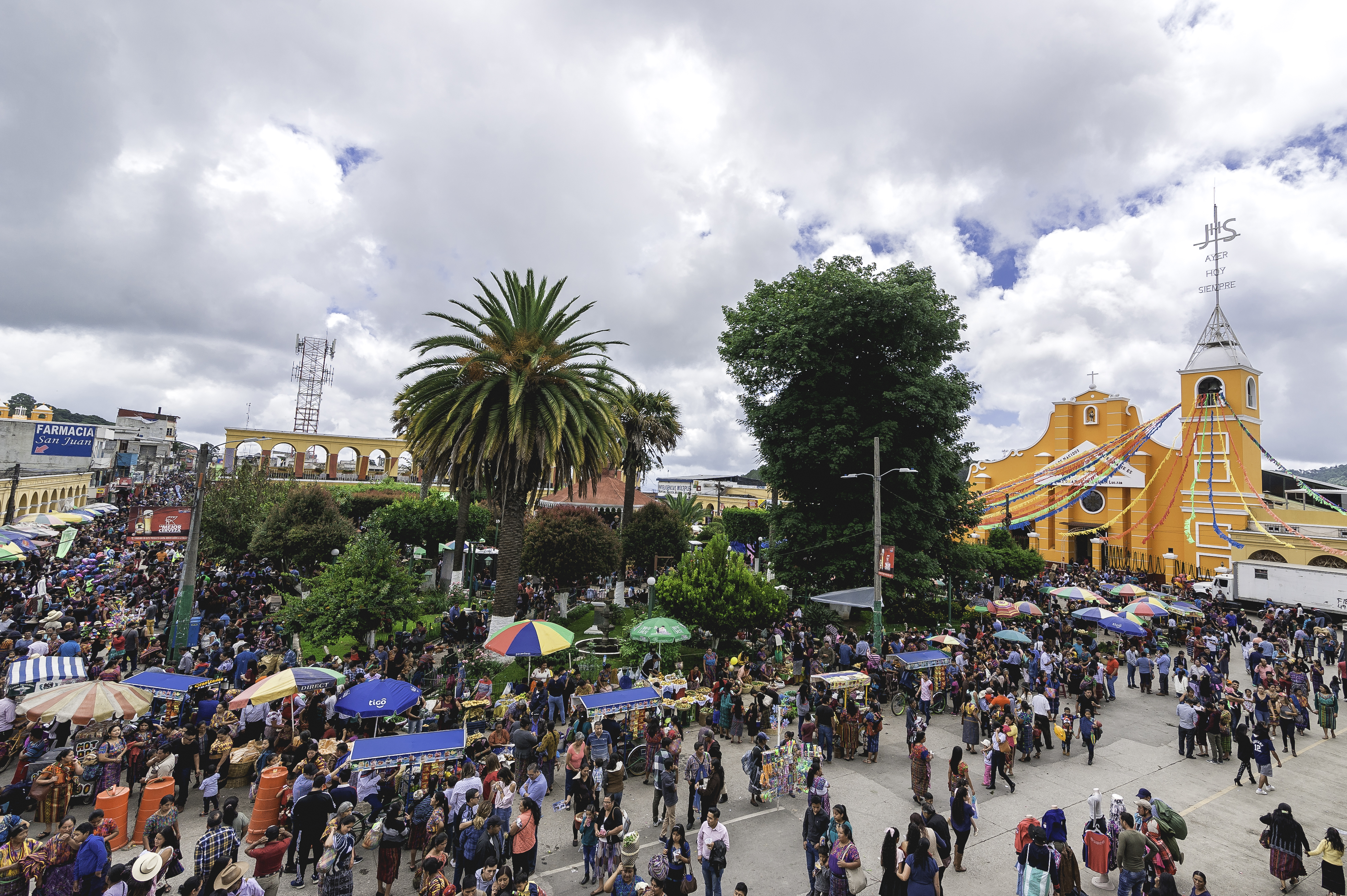
- People in San Juan Sacatepéquez

- Location in Guatemala
- Coordinates: 14°43′8″N 90°38′39″W
- Country: Guatemala
- Department: Guatemala

Government
  - Mayor: Fernando Bracamonte (PP)

Area
  - Municipality: 113 sq mi (292 km^{2})

Population (2018 census)
  - Municipality: 218,156
  - Density: 1,940/sq mi (747/km^{2})
  - Urban: 155,965
- Climate: Cwb

San Juan Sacatepéquez (Spanish pronunciation: [saŋ ˈxwan sakateˈpekes]) is a city, with a population of 155,965 (2018 census) making it the eighth largest in Guatemala, and a municipality in the Guatemala department of Guatemala, northwest of Guatemala City. The city is known for flower-growing and wooden furniture.

== History ==
=== Doctrine of Order of Preachers ===
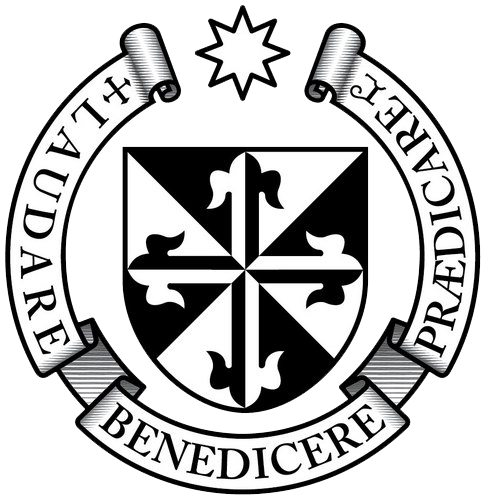
Order of Preachers coat of arms.

After the conquest, the Spanish crown focused on the Catholic evangelism of the natives. Settlements founded by royal missionaries in the New World were called "Indian doctrines" or simply "doctrines". Originally, friars had only temporary missions: teach the Catholic faith to the natives, and then transfer the settlements to secular parishes, just like ones that existed in Spain at the time; the friars were supposed to teach Spanish and Catholicism to the natives. When the natives were ready, they could start living in parishes and contribute with mandatory tithing, just as people in Spain did.

But this plan never materialized, mainly because the Spanish crown lost control of the regular orders as soon as their friars set course to America. Shielded by their apostolic privileges granted to convert natives into Catholicism, the missionaries only responded to their order's local authorities, and never to that of the Spanish government or the secular bishops. The orders' local authorities, in turn, only dealt with their own order and not with the Spanish crown. Once a doctrine had been established, it protected its own economic interests, even against those of the King and thus, the doctrines became Indian towns that remains unaltered for the remainder of the Spanish colonial period.

The doctrines were founded at the friars' discretion, given that they were completely at liberty to settle communities provided the main purpose was eventually to transfer it as a secular parish which would be tithing of the bishop. In reality, what happened was that the doctrines grew uncontrollably and were never transferred to any secular parish; they formed around the locality of the monastery and from there, they would go out to preach to settlements that belong to the doctrine and were called "annexes", "visits" or "visit towns". Therefore, the doctrines had three main characteristics:

1. they were independent from external controls (both ecclesiastical and civilian )
2. were run by a group of friars
3. had a relatively larger number of annexes.

The main characteristic of the doctrines was that they were run by a group of friars, because it made sure that the community system would continue without any issue when one of the members died.

In 1638, the Order of Preachers split their large doctrines, which meant large economic benefits for them, in groups centred around each one of their six monasteries, and the San Juan Sacatepéquez doctrine was moved under the Santiago de los Caballeros de Guatemala monastery jurisdiction:

Monastery	Doctrines
Santiago de los Caballeros de Guatemala	Chimaltenango; Jocotenango; Sumpango; San Juan Sacatepéquez; San Pedro Sacatepéquez; Santiago Sacatepéquez; Rabinal; San Martín Jilotepeque; Escuintla; Milpas Altas; Milpas Bajas; San Lucas Sacatepéquez; Barrio de Santo Domingo

In 1754, the Order of Preachers had to give away all of its doctrines and curatos to the secular clergy, as part of the Enlightened absolutism sponsored by the Spanish Monarch Carlos III.

== Climate ==
San Juan Sacatepéquez has temperate climate (Köppen: Csb).

Climate data for San Juan Sacatepéquez
Month	Jan	Feb	Mar	Apr	May	Jun	Jul	Aug	Sep	Oct	Nov	Dec	Year
Mean daily maximum °C (°F)	21.5 (70.7)	22.6 (72.7)	23.9 (75.0)	24.4 (75.9)	24.0 (75.2)	22.5 (72.5)	22.6 (72.7)	23.0 (73.4)	22.3 (72.1)	21.5 (70.7)	21.6 (70.9)	21.6 (70.9)	22.6 (72.7)
Daily mean °C (°F)	15.6 (60.1)	16.4 (61.5)	17.3 (63.1)	18.3 (64.9)	18.4 (65.1)	18.0 (64.4)	17.9 (64.2)	18.0 (64.4)	17.6 (63.7)	16.9 (62.4)	16.4 (61.5)	15.8 (60.4)	17.2 (63.0)
Mean daily minimum °C (°F)	9.8 (49.6)	10.2 (50.4)	10.8 (51.4)	12.3 (54.1)	12.9 (55.2)	13.6 (56.5)	13.2 (55.8)	13.0 (55.4)	12.9 (55.2)	12.4 (54.3)	11.3 (52.3)	10.1 (50.2)	11.9 (53.4)
Average precipitation mm (inches)	6 (0.2)	4 (0.2)	3 (0.1)	37 (1.5)	111 (4.4)	250 (9.8)	201 (7.9)	201 (7.9)	248 (9.8)	122 (4.8)	29 (1.1)	6 (0.2)	1,218 (47.9)
Source: Climate-Data.org

== See also ==
- Chajoma
- List of places in Guatemala
- Guatemala Department

== Notes and references ==
=== Bibliography ===
- Juarros, Domingo (1818). Compendio de la historia de la Ciudad de Guatemala (in Spanish). Guatemala: Ignacio Beteta.
- van Oss, Adriaan C. (1986). Catholic Colonialism: A Parish History of Guatemala, 1524-1821. Cambridge, UK: Cambridge University Press. ISBN 9780521527125.
