= Rabinal =

- Municipality
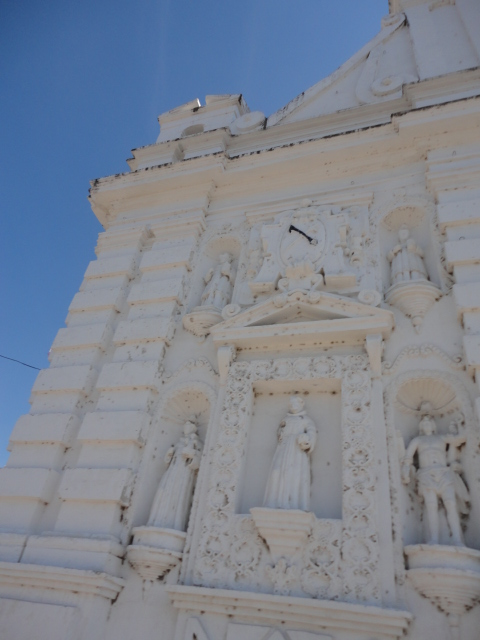
- Saints of Rabinal facade

- Location in Guatemala Rabinal (Baja Verapaz Department)
- Coordinates: 15°4′4.70″N 90°29′20.50″W
- Country: Guatemala
- Department: Baja Verapaz
- Founded: 1537

Government
  - Mayor: Luis Morales (PP)

Area
  - Total: 336 km^{2} (130 sq mi)

Population (2018 census)
  - Total: 40,797
  - Density: 121/km^{2} (314/sq mi)
- Climate: Aw
- Website: Official Website of the Municipality of Rabinal

Rabinal is a small town, with a population of 15,157 (2018 census), located in the Guatemalan department of Baja Verapaz, at 15°5′4.70″N 90°29′20.50″W. It serves as the administrative seat for the surrounding municipality of the same name. The municipality covers an area of 336 km^{2} with a population of 40,797 (2018 census). The local people are predominantly Achi Maya Native Americans who speak the Achi Maya language.

== History ==
The settlement of Rabinal is founded by Bartolomé de las Casas, during his expedition into the lands of the Maya in 1537.

=== Spanish conquest and the Dominican friars ===
On his second visit to Guatemala, in 1537, friar Bartolomé de las Casas, O.P. wanted to employ his new method of conversion based on two principles: 1) to preach the Gospel to all men and treat them as equals, and 2) to assert that conversion must be voluntary and based on knowledge and understanding of the Faith. It was important for Las Casas that this method be tested without meddling from secular colonists, so he chose a territory in the heart of Guatemala where there were no previous colonies and where the natives were considered fierce and war-like. Because the land had not been possible to conquer by military means, the governor of Guatemala, Alonso de Maldonado, agreed to sign a contract promising that if the venture was successful he would not establish any new encomiendas in the area. Las Casas's group of friars established a Dominican presence in Rabinal, Sacapulas and Cobán, reaching as far as Chahal. Through the efforts of Las Casas' missionaries the so-called "Land of War" came to be called "Verapaz", "True Peace". Las Casas's strategy was to teach Christian songs to merchant Indian Christians who then ventured into the area. In this way he was successful in converting several native chiefs, among them those of Atitlán and Chichicastenango, and in building several churches in the territory named Alta Verapaz. These congregated a group of Christian Indians in the location of what is now the town of Rabinal. In 1538 Las Casas was recalled from his mission by Bishop Francisco Marroquín who wanted him to go to Mexico and then on to Spain in order to seek more Dominicans to assist in the mission.

In 1572 construction finished on the grand colonial Catholic Baroque church, a project begun by then Bishop of Chiapas Bartolomé de las Casas.

During the mid-19th century Charles Étienne Brasseur de Bourbourg, serving as Parish Priest, conducts some of the first ethnographic studies of the highland Maya and collects folk tales and documents making the first translations into European languages, of the Rabinal Achí. As of 1850, the population was estimated to be 6,500.

Rabinal is the site of some of the bloodiest massacres in Guatemala's Civil War, including those of Plan de Sánchez and Río Negro. The actual town of Rabinal was also the site of a large-scale massacre during the Independence Day celebration of 1981.

=== Doctrine of Order of Preachers ===
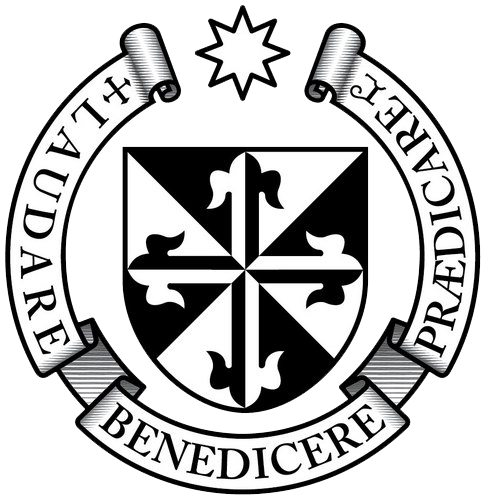
Order of Preachers coat of arms.

After the conquest, the Spanish crown focused on the Catholic indoctrination of the natives. Human settlements founded by royal missionaries in the New World were called "Indian doctrines" or simply "doctrines". Originally, friars had only temporary missions: teach the Catholic faith to the natives, and then transfer the settlements to secular parishes, just like the ones that existed in Spain at the time; the friars were supposed to teach Spanish and Catholicism to the natives. And when the natives were ready, they could start living in parishes and contribute with mandatory tithing, just like the people in Spain.

But this plan never materialized, mainly because the Spanish crown lost control of the regular orders as soon as their friars set course to America. Shielded by their apostolic privileges granted to convert natives into Catholicism, the missionaries only responded to their order local authorities, and never to that of the Spanish government or the secular bishops. The orders local authorities, in turn, only dealt with their own order and not with the Spanish crown. Once a doctrine had been established, they protected their own economic interests, even against the King, and thus the doctrines became Indian towns that remained unaltered for the rest of the Spanish colony.

The doctrines were founded at the friars discretion, given that they were completely at liberty to settle communities provided the main purpose was to eventually transfer it as a secular parish which would be tithing of the bishop. In reality, what happened was that the doctrines grew uncontrollably and were never transferred to any secular parish; they formed around the place where the friars had their monastery and from there, they would go out to preach to settlements that belong to the doctrine and were called "annexes", "visits" or "visit towns". Therefore, the doctrines had three main characteristics:

1. they were independent from external controls (both ecclesiastical and civilian )
2. were run by a group of friars
3. had a relatively larger number of annexes.

The main characteristic of the doctrines was that they were run by a group of friars, because it made sure that the community system would continue without any issue when one of the members died.

In 1638, the Order of Preachers split their large doctrines —which meant large economic benefits for them— in groups centered around each one of their six monasteries, and the Rabinal doctrine was moved under the Santiago de los Caballeros de Guatemala monastery jurisdiction:

Monastery	Doctrines
Santiago de los Caballeros de Guatemala	Chimaltenango; Jocotenango; Sumpango; San Juan Sacatepéquez; San Pedro Sacatepéquez; Santiago Sacatepéquez; Rabinal; San Martín Jilotepeque; Escuintla; Milpas Altas; Milpas Bajas; San Lucas Sacatepéquez; Barrio de Santo Domingo

=== Recent times ===
Rabinal was badly hit by the 1976 Guatemala earthquake. It was in the surroundings of Rabinal where John F. Kennedy Jr. served as a construction and aid worker in his teenage years.

== Culture ==
The town of Rabinal boasts a large, colonial-era baroque church. Alongside the church is a small municipal museum, with exhibits on the local culture (particularly native healing techniques) and a section dealing with the massacres of the 1980s. Various pre-Hispanic archaeological sites are also located in the surrounding hills.

The town's annual fiesta patronal takes place in late January each year and is famous for its dances, including one that recreates a legendary battle between the Achi and the K'iche Maya, declared a UNESCO World Heritage Cultural monument, known as The Rabinal Achí.

== Climate ==
Rabinal has a tropical savanna climate (Köppen: Aw).

Climate data for Rabinal
Month	Jan	Feb	Mar	Apr	May	Jun	Jul	Aug	Sep	Oct	Nov	Dec	Year
Mean daily maximum °C (°F)	27.5 (81.5)	28.8 (83.8)	30.5 (86.9)	30.7 (87.3)	30.0 (86.0)	28.5 (83.3)	28.4 (83.1)	28.7 (83.7)	28.3 (82.9)	27.8 (82.0)	27.7 (81.9)	27.8 (82.0)	28.7 (83.7)
Daily mean °C (°F)	20.5 (68.9)	21.4 (70.5)	23.1 (73.6)	23.8 (74.8)	23.7 (74.7)	23.2 (73.8)	23.0 (73.4)	23.0 (73.4)	22.7 (72.9)	22.2 (72.0)	21.3 (70.3)	20.8 (69.4)	22.4 (72.3)
Mean daily minimum °C (°F)	13.5 (56.3)	14.1 (57.4)	15.7 (60.3)	16.9 (62.4)	17.4 (63.3)	18.0 (64.4)	17.6 (63.7)	17.3 (63.1)	17.1 (62.8)	16.6 (61.9)	15.0 (59.0)	13.8 (56.8)	16.1 (61.0)
Average precipitation mm (inches)	5 (0.2)	9 (0.4)	10 (0.4)	24 (0.9)	90 (3.5)	188 (7.4)	125 (4.9)	69 (2.7)	132 (5.2)	84 (3.3)	27 (1.1)	6 (0.2)	769 (30.2)
Source: Climate-Data.org

== See also ==
- Bartolomé de las Casas
- Baja Verapaz

== Notes and references ==
=== Bibliography ===
- van Oss, Adriaan C. (1986). Catholic Colonialism: A Parish History of Guatemala, 1524-1821. Cambridge, UK: Cambridge University Press. ISBN 9780521527125.
- Wagner, Henry Raup; Parish, Helen Rand (1967). The Life and Writings of Bartolomé de Las Casas. University of New Mexico Press.
