= Chajoma =

Kaqchikel-speaking Maya people

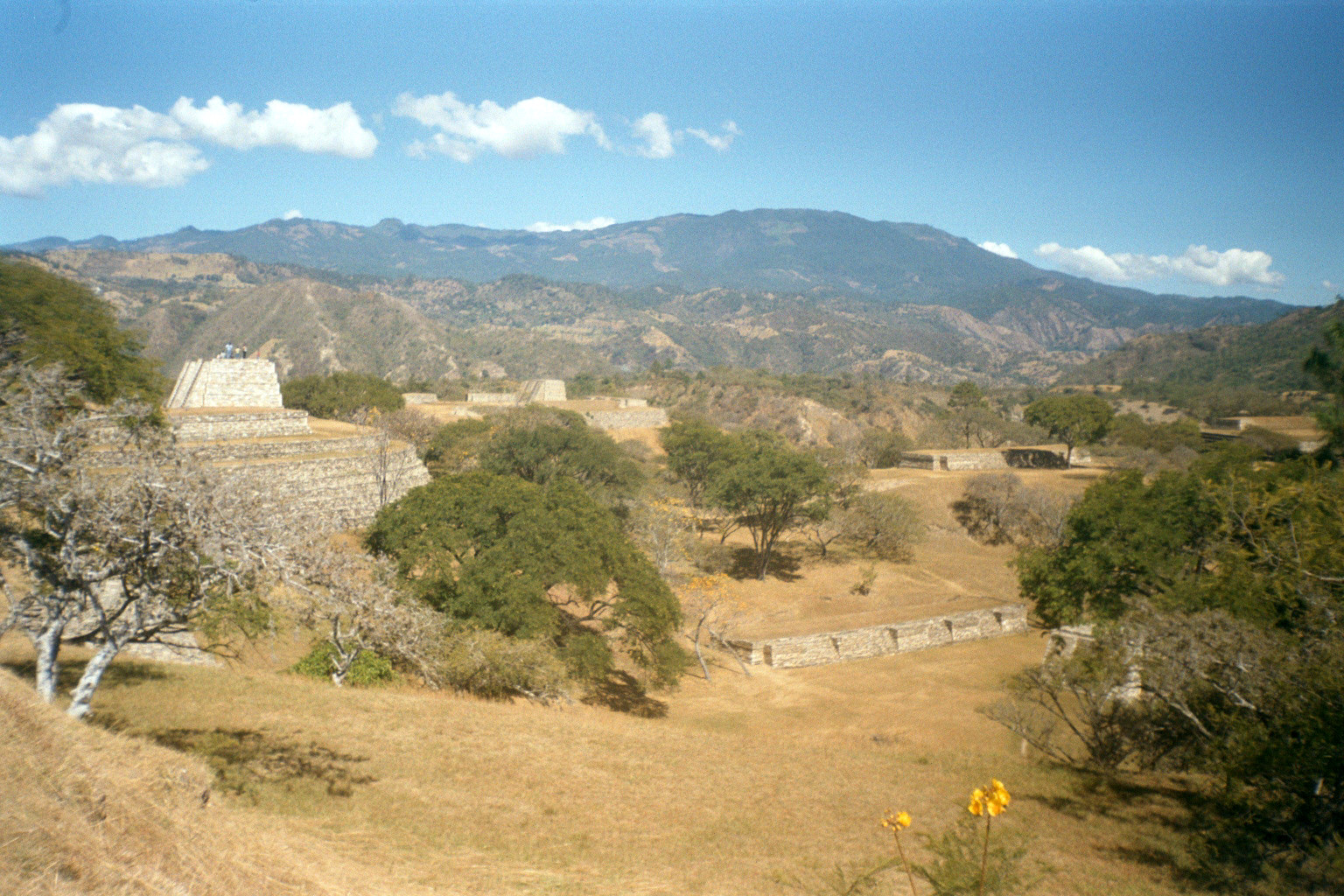
Mixco Viejo, capital of the Chajoma Maya

The Chajoma (Mayan pronunciation: [/tʃäχoˈmä/]) were a Kaqchikel-speaking Maya people of the Late Postclassic period, with a large kingdom in the highlands of Guatemala. According to the indigenous chronicles of the K'iche' and the Kaqchikel, there were three principal Postclassic highland kingdoms; the K'iche', the Kaqchikel and the Chajoma. In the Annals of the Cakchiquels the Chajoma of Jilotepeque were always referred to as the akajal vinak, in the Popul Vuh these can probably be identified with the akul vinak. Both akajal vinak and akul vinak mean "the bee people" or "the hive people".

Chajoma means "people of ocote" (a type of pine). In colonial times this was rendered into Nahuatl as sacatepēc "Grass mountain" which led to its current Hispanicized name Sacatepéquez. Early records, for example, record the placename San Juan Sacatepéquez as San Juan Chajoma. The Chajoma separated into six divisions, equivalent to the various colonial villages bearing Sacatepéquez in the name.

== Extent and population ==
The political geography of the Chajoma is described in some detail in a small group of early colonial documents composed by the Chajoma leadership. At its greatest extent, the Chajoma kingdom covered an area of 900–1000 km². It was bounded on the north by the Motagua River, on the east with the Las Vacas River, by San Pedro Ayampuc in the southeast, the River Chalcayá on the southwest and the River Quisayá to the west. Their neighbour to the south was the Poqomam kingdom, with its capital at Chinautla Viejo (Old Chinautla, identified as the Mixco Viejo of Colonial period records). To the west they were bordered by the Kaqchikel kingdom based at Iximche. This territory includes the northern third of the department of Guatemala and includes both the cooler highland area to the south and the hotter lowlands of the Motagua Valley to the north. The latter is a challenging area for agriculture, with the poor soil of the steep-sided lowland river valleys consisting of semi-weathered metamorphic schistose. The best land for agriculture lies in the southern highland portion of the Chajoma territory, with settlement concentrating there from the Classic Period onwards.

The Chajoma had their capital at the archaeological site currently known as Mixco Viejo (Old Mixco), apparently known to the Chajoma by a variety of names, including Chuapec Kekacajol Nima Abaj, Zakicajol and Nimcakajpec. Apart from Mixco Viejo, the principal archaeological sites associated with the Late Postclassic Chajoma kingdom are El Horno, Las Vegas, El Ciprés, Pueblo Viejo Jilotepeque, Chuisac, La Merced, Chuabaj, Chiboló and possibly Sacul. Of these, only El Horno, El Ciprés, Las Vegas and Sacul can be considered major settlements. Other sites, such as Pistun, La Canoa and Cerrito de las Minas, appear to have been remote outposts in strategically important locations or lookout points monitoring access routes.

Population estimates based on the number of archaeological sites put the Postclassic population of the Chajoma kingdom at 15–20,000 people divided between 15 and 20 clans. Evidence from Colonial documents suggest that 14 clans (or chinamit in Kaqchikel) survived into post-Conquest times, with 10 divided between San Pedro Sacatepéquez and San Juan Sacatepéquez and 4 in San Martín Jilotepeque. However, these were probably the most important chinamit clans, with survivors of smaller subservient chinamit groups being absorbed into the larger clans. An estimate based on archaeological sites with monumental architecture place 1 chinamit each at El Ciprés and Sacul, 4 at Las Vegas, 2–3 at El Horno and 5 at the archaeological site of Mixco Viejo; plus a possible 2 at Cucul and 1 at Pachalum on the north back of the Motagua, if these were Chajoma sites. This would give a total of 13–16 clans, which is roughly equivalent to the number comprising the other two major highland kingdoms, the K'iche' and the Kaqchikel.

== Known rulers ==
All dates are approximate.

Name	Ruled	Alternative names
Lajuj No'j	c.1450–c.1480	Ichalkan Chi Kumkwat, Ychal Amollac Chicumcuat
Achi Q'alel	early 16th century	-

== History ==
=== Origins ===
Indigenous documents describe how the ancestors of the Chajoma, Kaqchikel and K'iche' arrived at a mythical place called Tulan, and then left after a time and wandered until they eventually settled in the Guatemalan highlands.

Recent archaeological research suggests that the ancestors of the Chajoma and other K'iche'an peoples, including also the K'iche', the Kaqchikel and the Tz'utujil, were already occupying the Guatemalan highlands in the Classic Period.

A brief history of Chajoma movements and their rulers is contained in an early Colonial document entitled the Título de los de San Martín Jilotepeque, written in 1555. This same document has been used to prove that the Mixco Viejo archaeological site was actually the Chajoma capital and not that of the Poqomam, as previously believed.

=== The Postclassic Period ===
The Chajoma claimed not to have been settled long in the lands where the Conquistadors found them in 1524, rather they had originated in the area around Zacualpa and Joyabaj, north of the Motagua River. From Zacualpa they began a movement towards the south, southeast and southwest around AD 1400. Investigations at the Zacualpa archaeological site have shown that it was occupied from the Classic through to the Early Postclassic but was abandoned by the Late Postclassic. The Chajoma migration appears to have been well organised and rapid, and they quickly established sites to defend the borders of their new territory, being placed in defensible locations that had previously been identified after extensive scouting over a large area.

The Chajoma apparently intermarried with the Xpantzay clan of the main branch of the Kaqchikel when these occupied the site of Ochal, identified with the archaeological site of Chuisac, located 2 km west of San Martín Jilotepeque. According to the Testamento de los Xpantzay, the Chajoma supplied the Xpantzay with wives from their aristocratic class, an arrangement that appears to have been established as far back as the Early Postclassic.

By around 1410, according to the Anales de los Cakchiqueles, Ochal had become a Chajoma town. It appears that, provoked by the aggressive expansion of the K'iche' Kingdom of Q'umarkaj, the Chajoma abandoned their old capital of Zacualpa when Ochal was vacated by the Xpantzay, who claimed to have left Ochal in order to serve the K'iche' king Q'uq'umatz together with other Kaqchikel groups. In the 15th century Ochal (known to the Chajoma as Och'al Kab'awil Siwan) became the new Chajoma capital. Around 1425, the K'iche' of Q'umarkaj seized the largely abandoned former Chajoma capital at Zacualpa.

==== Rule of Lajuj No'j ====
A powerful 15th century Chajoma lord was known by the name Ichalkan Chi Kumkwat in Nahuatl and Lajuj No'j in Kaqchikel. Around 1450, with Kaqchikel help, he put down a rebellion by vassals along the Motagua river. As a result of the rebellion, this lord left his capital at Och'al Kab'awil Siwan (Pan Och'al in San Martín Jilotepeque) and moved it to Saqik'ajol Kaqapek (Jilotepeque Viejo, the archaeological site known as Mixco Viejo). The Chajoma alliance with the Kaqchikel became more powerful until the Kaqchikels turned on Lajuj No'j and his Chajoma and completely defeated them.

The Chajoma were involved in wars with their neighbours the K'iche', the Kaqchiquel and the Poqomam. In the late 15th century when Lajuj No'j was the Chajoma king, the Kaqchikel conquered several Chajoma villages on behalf of their K'iche' overlords, pushing the border between the two kingdoms eastwards. Lajuj No'j was murdered with much of his entourage at Iximche, the Kaqchikel capital, around 1480. In the Annals of the Cakchiquels, the Kaqchikel record that they attacked the Akajal (Chajoma) settlements of Panah and Chiholom, conquering the former. After these battles and prior to the Spanish Conquest the Chajoma probably made tribute payments to the Kaqchiquel of Iximche but were not completely subject to them. Even after the Conquest, the western boundary between the Chajoma and the Kaqchikel of Iximché remained a source of dispute, even down to modern times.

In 1493 the lords of Iximche judged in favour of the Chajoma in a land dispute between these and the Tukuche clan of the Kaqchikels, this caused the Tukuche to rebel against their rulers and resulted in their expulsion from Iximche.

Shortly before the Spanish Conquest, the Chajoma under their lord Achi Q'alel rebelled against the Kaqchikels of Iximche. Just before the Conquest, the Chajoma occupied the area of the modern municipalities of San Martín Jilotepeque, Santo Domingo Xenacoj, San Pedro Sacatepéquez, San Juan Sacatepéquez, San Raimundo, Chuarrancho, San Pedro Ayampuc and the northern portion of Chinautla, an area that coincides with the Eastern Kaqchikel dialect area.

=== Spanish Conquest ===
There are no direct sources describing the conquest of the Chajoma by the Spanish but it appears to have been a drawn-out campaign rather than a rapid victory. The only description of the conquest of the Chajoma is a secondary account appearing in the work of Francisco Antonio de Fuentes y Guzmán in the 17th century, long after the event. After the Conquest, the inhabitants of the eastern part of the kingdom were relocated by the conquerors to San Pedro Sacatepéquez, including some of the inhabitants of the site now known as Mixco Viejo. The rest of the population of Mixco Viejo, together with the inhabitants of the western part of the kingdom, were moved to San Martín Jilotepeque.

The Chajoma rebelled against the Spanish in 1526, fighting a battle at Ukub'il, an unidentified site somewhere near the modern towns of San Juan Sacatepéquez and San Pedro Sacatepéquez. (Note: The rebellion and the Spanish response, led by Pedro de Portocarrero, is described in Part One Book 13 Chapter IV of the Recordación Florida.)

In the colonial period, most of the surviving Chajoma were forcibly settled in the towns of San Juan Sacatepéquez, San Pedro Sacatepéquez and San Martín Jilotepeque as a result of the Spanish policy of congregaciones, with the people being moved to whichever of these three towns was closest to their pre-Conquest land holdings. Some Iximche Kaqchikels seem also to have been relocated to the same towns with them. After their relocation to the new towns, some of the Chajoma drifted back to their pre-Conquest centres, creating informal settlements and provoking hostilities with the Poqomam of Mixco and Chinautla along the former border between the pre-Columbian kingdoms. Some of these settlements eventually received official recognition, such as San Raimundo near Sacul.

== Archaeological sites ==
=== La Canoa ===
La Canoa lies to the east of San Pedro Ayampuc, a short distance from the road to Petaca. It consists of a small hill that has been artificially flattened and that once probably supported a small number of houses built from perishable materials. The site has been severely damaged.

=== Cerrito de las Minas ===
Cerrito de las Minas was a small outpost situated in the northeastern extremity of the Chajoma kingdom, apparently to control the route to and from Baja Verapaz to the north. A modern road follows the course of a colonial road that was probably also an important route in the Late Preclassic. The site consists of a single small pyramid measuring 3 by 3 by 1 metre (9.8 by 9.8 by 3.3 ft) sat on top of a steep sided cone of volcanic ash, with some small house terraces extending some of the way down the side. A dozen house platforms are situated on a promontory immediately to the north but the group has not been investigated and it is likely that it is the remains of a post-Conquest settlement due to its open layout and absence of pyramids or a ballcourt.

=== Chuabaj ===
Chuabaj is located 12 kilometres (7.5 mi) north of San Martín Jilotepeque. It was a large site although the architecture has been destroyed.

=== Chuisac (Ochal) ===
Group D at Chuisac appears to have had a Late Postclassic occupation, which probably corresponds to the temporary occupation of the site by the Chajoma before they moved their capital to the archaeological site of Mixco Viejo.

=== El Ciprés ===
El Ciprés was first reported in 1941 by Edwin M. Shook, who named it Cimientos. The location of the site was lost by the 1970s and rediscovered in 1991. The site possesses a well-preserved I-shaped ballcourt. In common with other Postclassic sites, it is defensively situated on a plateau surrounded by deep ravines. Most of the structures of the site are small but possess fine flagstone masonry. The two larger structures are the ballcourt and a long structure on the east side of the site.

=== El Horno ===
El Horno is a major site in the eastern Chajoma region. It is situated near the eastern border of San Pedro Ayampuc with San José del Golfo. The structures of the site are divided into three easily defended groups, although they lie below the ridgelines of the surrounding hills, on promontories halfway up a ravine near the village of Petaca, 100 metres (330 ft) above the bottom of the ravine.

Group I is the largest group at the site. It contains an unfinished and heavily looted I-shaped ballcourt.

Group II is linked to Group I by a narrow neck of land. The group is dominated by two badly damaged and looted pyramids built of flagstone and also possesses a number of house platforms.

Group III is situated on a separate promontory to Groups I and II, some 500 metres (1,600 ft) to the west. Like Group II it possesses two pyramids with flagstone masonry, and has 5 or more house platforms. Ceramic fragments recovered from Group III are of a type typical of the Late Postclassic and especially common at the Mixco Viejo archaeological site.

=== Pistun ===
Pistun is a small site that has in the past been considered larger than is actually the case due to natural hillocks being mistaken for the remains of artificial structures. Only two structures have been confirmed; a small altar platform with flagstone masonry and a long narrow structure. The site is situated defensively on a hill on the east side of Cerro El Apazote overlooking the Aguacate River. Projectile points were found scattered near the eastern entrance to the site and suggest that a battle took place there, which may have resulted in its abandonment.

=== Pueblo Viejo ===
Pueblo Viejo is located about 10 kilometres (6.2 mi) northwest of San Martín Jilotepeque. Only one structure is currently known at the site, located defensively on a promontory surrounded by deep ravines and may have served as an outpost.

=== Sacul ===
This site was discovered by Earle who reported Classic Period surface ceramic finds. However, it is defensively situated on an 80-metre (260 ft) plateau bordered by a stream, typical of Postclassic sites. By the mid-1990s, Sacul had neither been investigated archaeologically nor looted. On the other side of the ravine to the northwest of Sacul are the sites of El Tesoro and Chirioj, both dating to the Late Classic.

=== Las Vegas ===
This site was first reported in 1988 by Duncan M Earle and named Chillani after a nearby modern settlement. It lies within the municipality of Chinautla, near the village of San Antonio de las Flores. The site has since been renamed to Las Vegas, after the name of the estate on which it lies. Archaeologist Robert M. Hill II carried out a preliminary exploration of the site in 1991. The site consists of 26 structures divided into four groups, labelled groups I through to IV, built on top of an easily defensible 80-metre-high (260 ft) ridge between the ravines Quebrada Quezada and Quebrada San Pedro. Each of the four groups contains at least one pyramid and a number of house platforms. All the structures are poorly preserved although Hill reported that only one had been looted in 1996. Surviving masonry consists of cut blocks of tuff or pumice, and of flagstone. A violent end to occupation at the site is suggested by the presence of large quantities of burnt mud daub, and may be linked to the Spanish Conquest. Las Vegas was located only a few kilometers north of the Poqomam capital at Chinautla Viejo.

Group I Evidence of violence was found in this group in the form of burnt mud daub, although not to the same extent as in Group III.

Group II has an unusual structure to the north, which is probably all that survives of the badly eroded remains of a ballcourt. As with Group I, evidence of violence was found in Group II in the form of burnt mud daub, again to a lesser extent than in Group III.

Group III Large amounts of burnt mud daub were found among the most eastern structures of this group and may be linked to the Spanish Conquest.

Group IV Earle reported a wide variety of Late Postclassic ceramic sherds from Group IV. The westernmost structure in this group has been looted.
