= Cunén =

Santa María Cunén Cunén
- Municipality of Guatemala
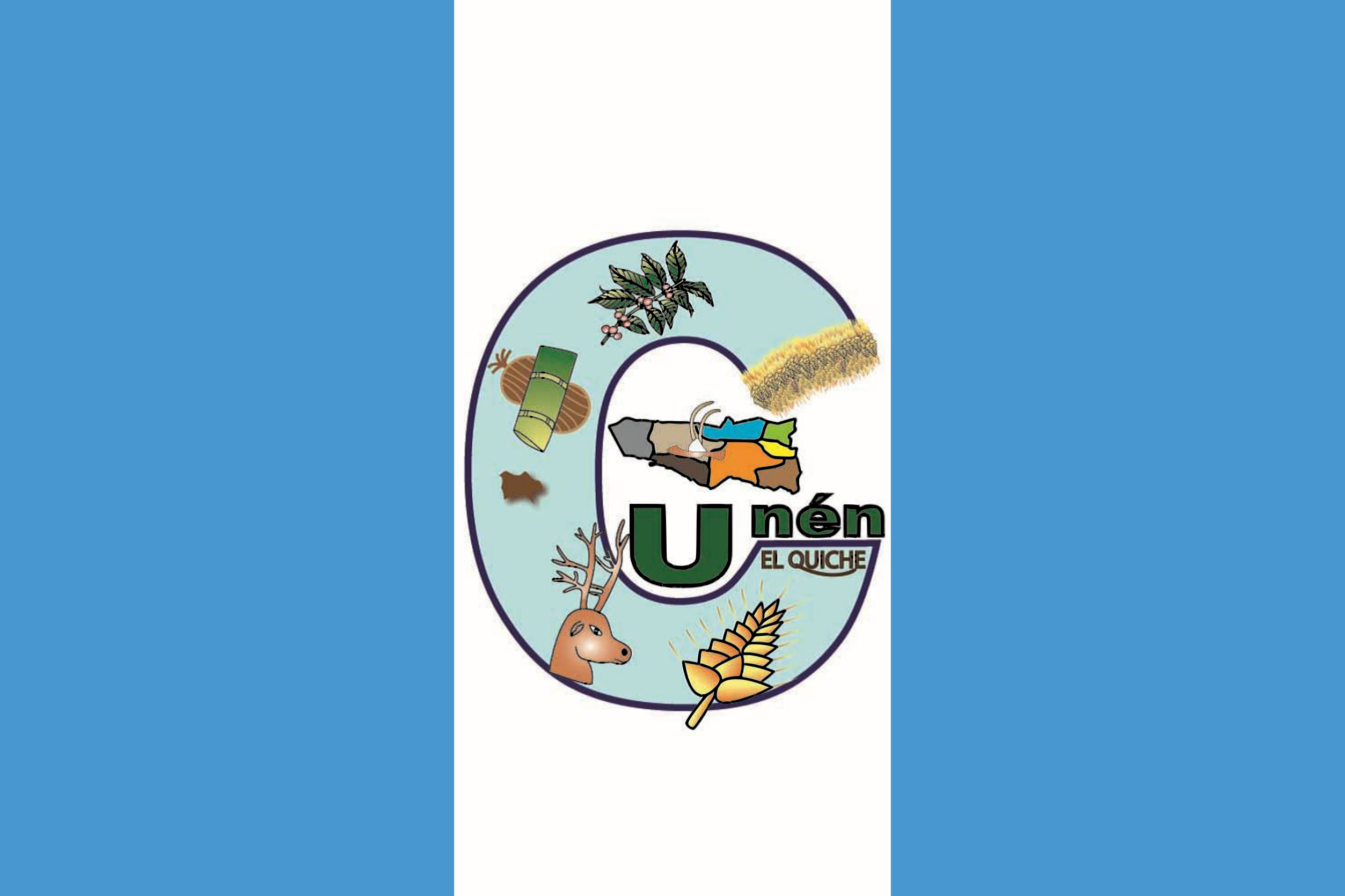
- Flag

- Location in Guatemala
- Coordinates: 15°20′15″N 91°02′00″W
- Country: Guatemala
- Department: El Quiché
- Municipality: Cunén

Government
  - Type: Municipal
  - Mayor: Pedro Alejandro Pu Canto

Area
  - Municipality of Guatemala: 195 km^{2} (75 sq mi)
- Elevation: 1,827 m (5,994 ft)

Population (Census 2018)
  - Municipality of Guatemala: 41,455
  - Density: 213/km^{2} (551/sq mi)
  - Urban: 7,903
  - Ethnicities: K'iche' Ladino
  - Religions: Roman Catholicism Evangelicalism Maya
- Climate: Cwb

Santa María Cunén (usually abbreviated to Cunén) is a town and municipality in the El Quiché department of Guatemala. The municipality covers 195 km^{2}. At an average altitude of 1,827 metres above sea level, its climate is temperate. It is located 68 km from the departmental capital, Santa Cruz del Quiché, as measured by paved road. Tourist attractions include Las Grutas and the El Chorro waterfall.

== History ==
=== Monastery and doctrine of Order of Preachers ===
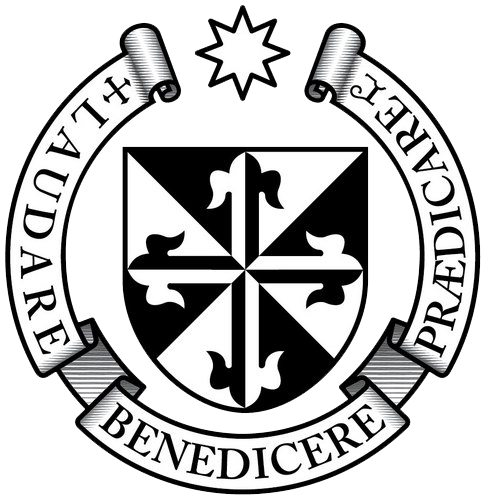
Order of Preachers coat of arms.

After the conquest, the Spanish crown focused on the Catholic indoctrination of the natives. Human settlements founded by royal missionaries in the New World were called "Indian doctrines" or simply "doctrines". Originally, friars had only temporary missions: teach the Catholic faith to the natives, and then transfer the settlements to secular parishes, just like the ones that existed in Spain at the time; the friars were supposed to teach Spanish and Catholicism to the natives. And when the natives were ready, they could start living in parishes and contribute with mandatory tithing, just like the people in Spain.

But this plan never materialized, mainly because the Spanish crown lost control of the regular orders as soon as their friars set course to America. Shielded by their apostolic privileges granted to convert natives into Catholicism, the missionaries only responded to their order local authorities, and never to that of the Spanish government or the secular bishops. The orders local authorities, in turn, only dealt with their own order and not with the Spanish crown. Once a doctrine had been established, the protected their own economic interests, even against those of the King and thus, the doctrines became Indian towns that remains unaltered for the rest of the Spanish colony.

The doctrines were founded at the friars discretion, given that they were completely at liberty to settle communities provided the main purpose was to eventually transfer it as a secular parish which would be tithing of the bishop. In reality, what happened was that the doctrines grew uncontrollably and were never transferred to any secular parish; they formed around the place where the friars had their monastery and from there, they would go out to preach to settlements that belong to the doctrine and were called "annexes", "visits" or "visit towns". Therefore, the doctrines had three main characteristics:

1. they were independent from external controls (both ecclesiastical and civilian )
2. were run by a group of friars
3. had a relatively larger number of annexes.

The main characteristic of the doctrines was that they were run by a group of friars, because it made sure that the community system would continue without any issue when one of the members died.

In 1638, the Order of Preachers split their large doctrines —which meant large economic benefits for them— in groups centered around each one of their six monasteries, including the Sacapulas monastery, under whose jurisdiction was the Cunén doctrine:

Monastery	Doctrines
Sacapulas	Sacapulas; Cunén; Nebaj; Santa Cruz; San Andrés Sajcabajá; Zacualpa; Chichicastenango

=== After the independence of Central America ===
After the independence of Central America in 1821 began the Central American Civil War between the conservatives that wanted to keep the regular orders and aristocrats in control, and the liberals who wanted to expel them. In 1829, after general Francisco Morazán's victory, the conservative regime of Mariano de Aycinena y Piñol was taken down and both his family and associated and the regular clergy were expelled from Central America, leaving behind only secular clergy priests, although heavily weakened, given that mandatory tithing was abolished. This heavily impacted Cunén, as the Order of Preachers was forced to leave the country leaving their doctrine behind; in 1836, liberal government of Mariano Gálvez incorporated Cunén to Sololá's district.

After the conservatives regained power in 1840, the regular clergy returned to Guatemala, but they were not able to recover their old properties. But they were expelled once again after the Liberal Revolution of 1871 and with the creation of Quiché Department in 1872, Cunén was raised to municipality category by executive order #72 of 12 August 1872.

Years later, general Jorge Ubico declared Cunén as a pre Columbine National Monument on 24 April 1931.

=== Guatemalan Civil War ===
During the Guatemalan Civil War Cunén found itself in the area where the Ejército Guerrillero de los Pobres -one of the guerrilla organizations that operated in Guatemala- was active. This organization justified its terrorist attacks against private and public infrastructure by saying that they only impacted the economic interests of both State and the country's productive sector and that it made the Guatemalan Army more vulnerable. In the Comisión para el Esclarecimiento Histórico final report, former EGP members said that "destroying infrastructure just under the concept of destroying the country's infrastructure, to damage the country, that did not happen. There was always an explanation... in context with the war that we were sustaining at the time and in context within the tactic moment when we were going to blow up a bridge, yes, we were going to blow it up so that the Army could not go through and to stop it from its barbarism... to cut its advances and withdraws- But from Nentón to the North, the highway was closed [end of 1981 to beginning of 1982], the Army did not get in, not a single authority would come in, and the telegraph posts -which were the other communication device that existed- were taken down". "When we cut power to some (Army) barracks the power to the closest towns and village was cut as well, creating resentment in the population. Afterwards, the sabotages were commonplace in order to create chaos along the country and preparing the conditions of a pre insurrection state".

The EGP attacks that affected Cunén were:

Date	Target	Result
16 November 1981	State Power Institute facilities in Santa Cruz del Quiché	Left without power all of the nearby municipalities.
18 December 1981	«El Tesoro» Bruidge in Quiché Department	The bridge was completely destroyed, cutting any Army access.
21 December 1981	Cunén's town hall building and telegraph facilities	Set the buildings on fire to destroy any civil records.
19 January 1982	State Power Institute facilities in Santa Cruz del Quiché	Left without power all of the nearby municipalities.
27 January 1982	Bridges that communicated to San Miguel Uspantán, Nebaj and Chajul in Quiché Department	Completely destroyed both bridges, cutting any access to the Army.

In order to counterattack the guerrilla offensive after the victory of the Sandinista Revolution in Nicaragua in 1979, general Lucas García's government began a "Scorched earth" offensive of its own in the area controlled by the Ejército Guerrillero de los Pobres, -Chajul, Nebaj and Ixcán in Quiché Department-i.e., agricultural and oil-reach region of the Northern Transversal strip-; as part of this offensive, there were intense attacks on civil communities with resulted in massacres that were duly recorded in both the REHMI and Comisión para el Esclarecimiento Histórico final reports.

In several cases, massacres occurred either at a special day for a community or during large scale operatives with large military force displays and aviation backup. The airplanes bombed certain zones; at least one of each nine communities suffered a bombing associated to a massacre, either in the previous or following days. The areas more heavily bombed were the Ixil triangle and Sacapulas, some parts of Baja Verapaz Department and also from Huehuetenango Department. After an attack of this kind it was common that up to 40% of the surviving population left town to survive, going into the mountains, into exile in Mexico or to another community. The maya k'iche' population that looked for refuge in the mountains was labeled as "guerrilla" by the Army, which tighten military controls around them and continuous attacks that made extremely had to get food or medical attention. These people remained in the mountains for almost two years until they finally moved to Las Guacamayas, where they became isolated due to the military pressure. A lot of people died of starvation.

Specifically in Cunén, State Armed Forces would have perpetrated massacres in the Cunén Villa in January 1981, and in the Chutuj settlement Chimanzana village in January 1982.

== Climate ==
Cunén has a subtropical highland climate (Köppen: Cwb).

Climate data for Cunén
Month	Jan	Feb	Mar	Apr	May	Jun	Jul	Aug	Sep	Oct	Nov	Dec	Year
Mean daily maximum °C (°F)	16.7 (62.1)	17.2 (63.0)	18.8 (65.8)	19.4 (66.9)	18.4 (65.1)	17.7 (63.9)	17.2 (63.0)	17.7 (63.9)	17.4 (63.3)	16.4 (61.5)	16.9 (62.4)	17.0 (62.6)	17.6 (63.6)
Daily mean °C (°F)	10.4 (50.7)	10.6 (51.1)	12.0 (53.6)	12.9 (55.2)	13.0 (55.4)	13.1 (55.6)	12.6 (54.7)	12.5 (54.5)	12.7 (54.9)	11.9 (53.4)	11.3 (52.3)	11.1 (52.0)	12.0 (53.6)
Mean daily minimum °C (°F)	4.2 (39.6)	4.1 (39.4)	5.3 (41.5)	6.4 (43.5)	7.7 (45.9)	8.5 (47.3)	8.0 (46.4)	7.3 (45.1)	8.0 (46.4)	7.4 (45.3)	5.8 (42.4)	5.3 (41.5)	6.5 (43.7)
Average precipitation mm (inches)	31 (1.2)	21 (0.8)	26 (1.0)	65 (2.6)	142 (5.6)	258 (10.2)	185 (7.3)	198 (7.8)	244 (9.6)	173 (6.8)	68 (2.7)	26 (1.0)	1,437 (56.6)
Source: Climate-Data.org

== Geographic location ==
Cunén is surrounded by El Quiché municipalities.

== See also ==
- Chajoma
- Quiché Department

== Notes and references ==
=== Bibliography ===
- Comisión para el Esclarecimiento Histórico: Vol. IV (1999). "Atentados contra sedes municipales". Guatemala: Memoria del Silencio (in Spanish). Programa de Ciencia y Derechos Humanos, Asociación Americana del Avance de la Ciencia. Archived from the original (online edition) on 6 May 2013.
- van Oss, Adriaan C. (1986). Catholic Colonialism: A Parish History of Guatemala, 1524-1821. Cambridge, UK: Cambridge University Press. ISBN 9780521527125.
