= San Martín Jilotepeque =

- Municipality and town
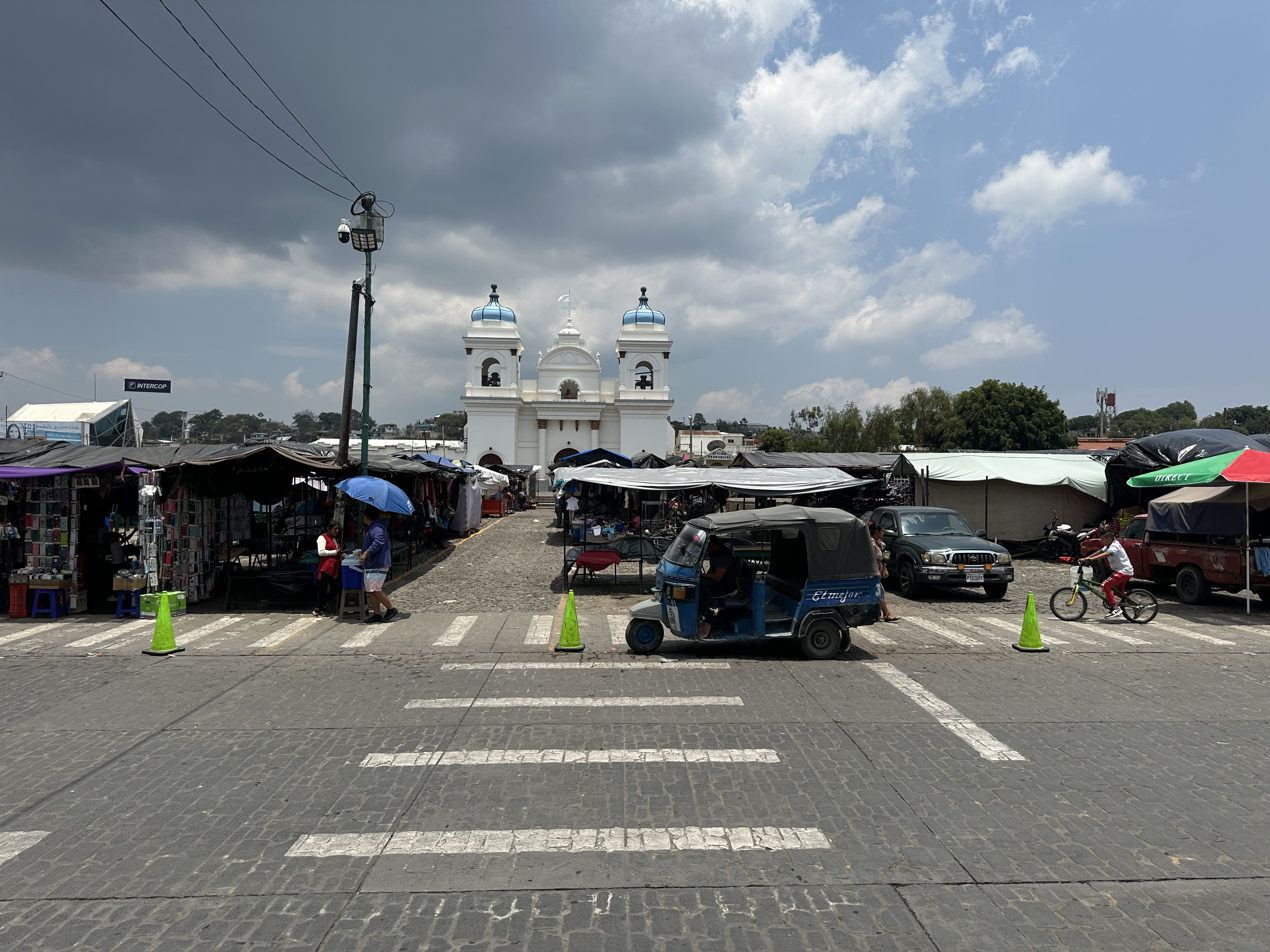
- San Martín Jilotepeque Central Park

- Location within Guatemala
- Coordinates: 14°47′N 90°48′W
- Country: Guatemala
- Department: Chimaltenango

Area
  - Total: 144 sq mi (374 km^{2})

Population (2018 census)
  - Total: 73,469
  - Density: 509/sq mi (196/km^{2})
- Time zone: UTC+6 (Central Time)
- Climate: Cwb

San Martín Jilotepeque is a town, with a population of 10,812 (2018 census), and a municipality in the Chimaltenango department of Guatemala. It was the site of a bus accident in 2013.

== History ==
=== Doctrine of Order of Preachers ===
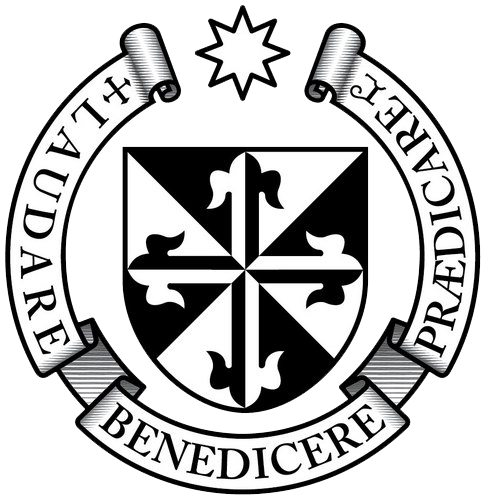
Order of Preachers coat of arms.

After the conquest, the Spanish crown focused on the Catholic indoctrination of the natives. Human settlements founded by royal missionaries in the New World were called "Indian doctrines" or simply "doctrines". Originally, friars had only temporary missions: teach the Catholic faith to the natives, and then transfer the settlements to secular parishes, just like the ones that existed in Spain at the time; the friars were supposed to teach Spanish and Catholicism to the natives. And when the natives were ready, they could start living in parishes and contribute with mandatory tithing, just like the people in Spain.

But this plan never materialized, mainly because the Spanish crown lost control of the regular orders as soon as their friars set course to America. Shielded by their apostolic privileges granted to convert natives into Catholicism, the missionaries only responded to their order local authorities, and never to that of the Spanish government or the secular bishops. The orders local authorities, in turn, only dealt with their own order and not with the Spanish crown. Once a doctrine had been established, the protected their own economic interests, even against those of the King and thus, the doctrines became Indian towns that remains unaltered for the rest of the Spanish colony.

The doctrines were founded at the friars discretion, given that they were completely at liberty to settle communities provided the main purpose was to eventually transfer it as a secular parish which would be tithing of the bishop. In reality, what happened was that the doctrines grew uncontrollably and were never transferred to any secular parish; they formed around the place where the friars had their monastery and from there, they would go out to preach to settlements that belong to the doctrine and were called "annexes", "visits" or "visit towns". Therefore, the doctrines had three main characteristics:

1. they were independent from external controls (both ecclesiastical and civilian )
2. were run by a group of friars
3. had a relatively larger number of annexes.

The main characteristic of the doctrines was that they were run by a group of friars, because it made sure that the community system would continue without any issue when one of the members died.

In 1638, the Order of Preachers split their large doctrines —which meant large economic benefits for them— in groups centered around each one of their six monasteries, and the San Martín Jilotepeque doctrine was moved under the Santiago de los Caballeros de Guatemala monastery jurisdiction:

Monastery	Doctrines
Santiago de los Caballeros de Guatemala	Chimaltenango; Jocotenango; Sumpango; San Juan Sacatepéquez; San Pedro Sacatepéquez; Santiago Sacatepéquez; Rabinal; San Martín Jilotepeque; Escuintla; Milpas Altas; Milpas Bajas; San Lucas Sacatepéquez; Barrio de Santo Domingo

== After the 1773 earthquake ==
In 1773, the Santa Marta earthquakes destroyed much of Santiago de los Caballeros de Guatemala, which led to the third change in location for the capital city. The Spanish Crown ordered, in 1776, the removal of the capital to a safer location, the Valley of the Shrine, where Guatemala City, the modern capital of Guatemala, now stands. This new city did not retain its old name and was christened Nueva Guatemala de la Asunción (New Guatemala of the Assumption), and its patron saint is Our Lady of the Assumption. The badly damaged city of Santiago de los Caballeros was ordered abandoned, although not everyone left, and was thereafter referred to as la Antigua Guatemala (the Old Guatemala).

By a Royal decree of July 21, 1775, the city move to the "Virgin valley" was authorized. This was a final order that had to be obeyed by all the people, who started to move slowly, starting on December of that year. In order to build the new city it was necessary to get construction material from the old abandoned churches in Santiago de Guatemala. However, in the case of the Society of Jesus church, there was strong opposition from the neighbors to any possible dismantling of the structure since they considered that it could still be repaired.

But not all the people moved to the new city; some of them settled in San Martín Jilotepeque and have remained there since.

=== 1976 earthquake ===
Ironically, San Martín Jilotepeque was one of the most impacted municipalities by the 1976 Guatemala earthquake; the town was completely ruined and only the colonial fountain in central square survived total destruction.

In the country, the impacted area was about 30.000 km², and 2,5 million people. Approximately twenty three thousand people died and seventy seven thousands were gravely injured. 40% of the hospitals infrastructure was destroyed and several buildings sustained grave damage.

== Climate ==
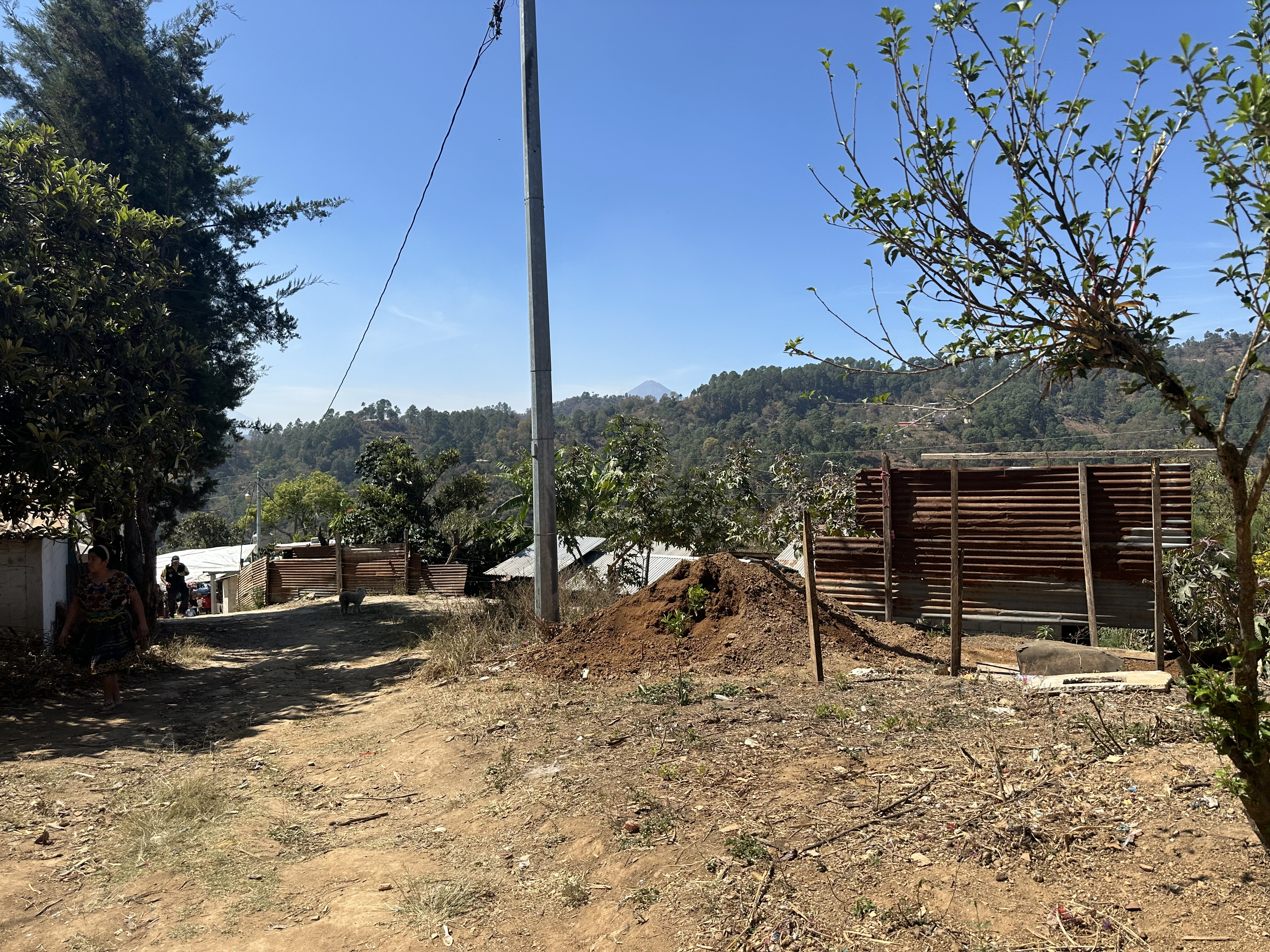
A town near San Martín Jilotepeque

San Martín Jilotepeque has a subtropical highland climate (Köppen: Cwb).

Climate data for San Martín Jilotepeque (1991–2020)
Month	Jan	Feb	Mar	Apr	May	Jun	Jul	Aug	Sep	Oct	Nov	Dec	Year
Record high °C (°F)	25.3 (77.5)	28.6 (83.5)	29.0 (84.2)	30.6 (87.1)	29.6 (85.3)	25.4 (77.7)	25.6 (78.1)	26.6 (79.9)	25.8 (78.4)	25.6 (78.1)	24.2 (75.6)	26.4 (79.5)	30.6 (87.1)
Mean daily maximum °C (°F)	21.6 (70.9)	22.4 (72.3)	23.3 (73.9)	23.8 (74.8)	23.2 (73.8)	22.4 (72.3)	22.2 (72.0)	22.3 (72.1)	22.2 (72.0)	21.9 (71.4)	21.5 (70.7)	21.5 (70.7)	22.4 (72.3)
Daily mean °C (°F)	16.8 (62.2)	17.8 (64.0)	19.0 (66.2)	20.0 (68.0)	19.9 (67.8)	19.3 (66.7)	19.1 (66.4)	19.1 (66.4)	18.9 (66.0)	18.5 (65.3)	17.6 (63.7)	17.2 (63.0)	18.6 (65.5)
Mean daily minimum °C (°F)	9.5 (49.1)	9.6 (49.3)	10.2 (50.4)	11.6 (52.9)	12.6 (54.7)	12.6 (54.7)	12.5 (54.5)	12.6 (54.7)	12.5 (54.5)	12.2 (54.0)	11.1 (52.0)	9.9 (49.8)	11.4 (52.5)
Record low °C (°F)	3.1 (37.6)	3.0 (37.4)	4.0 (39.2)	6.0 (42.8)	7.2 (45.0)	6.7 (44.1)	6.9 (44.4)	6.7 (44.1)	3.7 (38.7)	3.7 (38.7)	1.6 (34.9)	2.0 (35.6)	1.6 (34.9)
Average precipitation mm (inches)	2.0 (0.08)	1.9 (0.07)	9.9 (0.39)	42.4 (1.67)	166.0 (6.54)	233.6 (9.20)	179.4 (7.06)	208.2 (8.20)	250.3 (9.85)	169.9 (6.69)	33.4 (1.31)	9.9 (0.39)	1,306.9 (51.45)
Average precipitation days (≥ 1.0 mm)	0.6	0.6	1.3	3.6	11.7	16.8	14.5	16.4	19.4	14.1	4.3	1.4	104.7
Source: NOAA

== See also ==
- Chimaltenango

== Notes and references ==
=== Bibliography ===
- van Oss, Adriaan C. (1986). Catholic Colonialism: A Parish History of Guatemala, 1524-1821. Cambridge, UK: Cambridge University Press. ISBN 9780521527125.
