= Sacatepéquez =

Sacatepéquez (Spanish pronunciation: [sakateˈpekes]) was a city in Guatemala from November 21, 1542 until July 29, 1773 when it was destroyed by the Santa Marta earthquake. Sacatepéquez means "grass hill" and gave its name to the Sacatepéquez Department, founded in 1839.

Sacatepéquez and Antigua Guatemala were the two municipalities belonging to the department of Chimaltenango.

On September 12, 1839, the department of Sacatepéquez was created, getting its name from the former city. Antigua Guatemala was made the capital.

== See also ==
- Chajoma
