= Canillá =

- Municipality
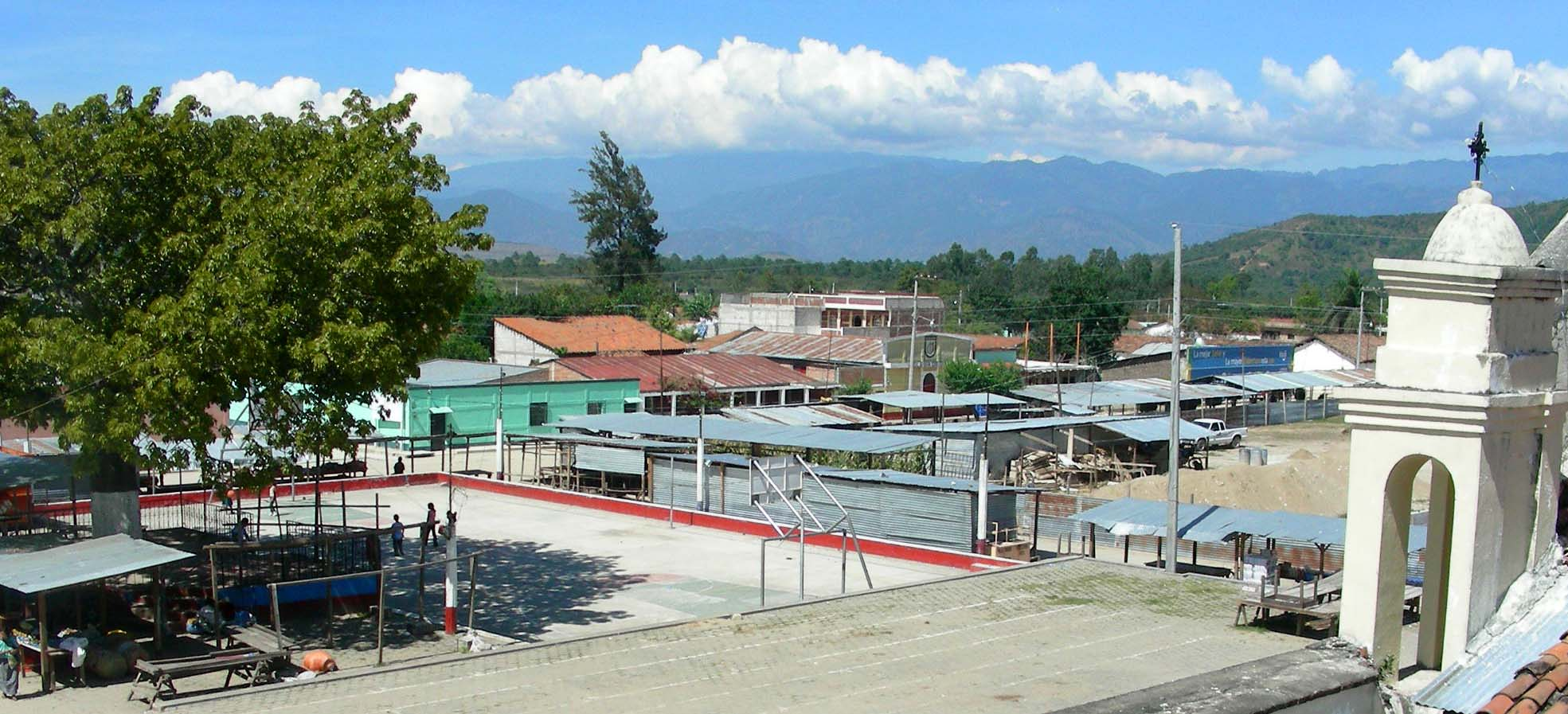
- Canillá's central plaza in 2006

- Location in Guatemala
- Coordinates: 15°10′00″N 90°51′00″W
- Country: Guatemala
- Department: El Quiché
- Municipality: Canillá

Government
  - Type: Municipal

Area
  - Municipality: 123 km^{2} (47 sq mi)
- Elevation: 1,300 m (4,300 ft)

Population (Health Center Annual Report 2013)
  - Municipality: 15,053
  - Urban: 2,198
  - Ethnicities: Kʼicheʼ Ladino
  - Religions: Roman Catholicism Evangelicalism Maya
- Postal code: 014018
- Climate: Am
- Website: http://www.inforpressca.com/canilla/

Canillá is a municipality in the Guatemalan department of El Quiché with a surface area of 123 km^{2} and a population of 15,053 people.

People in Canillá speak Spanish, Kʼicheʼ (a Mayan language), or both. Primary religions are Catholic and Evangelical.

== History ==
=== Pre Hispanic era ===
Worried about the defection of the aj Kʼubʼul family chief -who had taken his family away in order to look for fertile and, above all, pacific land-, the Kʼicheʼ king sent a group of soldiers to control every single movement of them. He was afraid that the aj Kʼubʼul would look for reinforcements from other ethnic group in the area to form a strong army and then attack the Kʼicheʼs. The warriors settled to the east of the aj K’ub’ul and since the latter had moved away to look for peace and tranquility, they were a very peaceful community. And that is exactly what the warriors inform the Kʼicheʼ king, reassuring him by telling that he should not worry about the exiled group, as they were really peaceful.

As time went by, the Kʼicheʼ warriors realized that the aj Kʼubʼul life was very different from the one they were used to have under the ruling of their king, as they simple worked on their land and crops and then enjoyed their families without having to worry about being invaded or called to fight in a war. Therefore, they went back to their place of origin, Tujalj (Sacapulas and Canillá), but only to pick up their families and went on to settle a new community where they were once stationed to keep an eye on the aj K'ub'ul. (Note: This was confirmed by Antonio Rodríguez, from Sacapulas, who witnessed the contact his family had with Rabinal, San Miguel Chicaj and Salamá in the 1950s. They knew that their families were related and always brought Sacapulas produce into those municipalities.)

=== After the Spanish conquest of Guatemala ===
In the 16th and 17th centuries there were hardly any mention to Canillá. In the 18th century, however, then archbishop of Guatemala, doctor Pedro Cortés y Larraz, made some notes on the place while he was traveling his parish between 1768 and made a stop at San Andrés Sahcabahá (San Andrés Sajcabajá): "There is a ranch called Caniliá and even though there is a valley of about half hour, but the land is too dry and there is a maize of very deep ravines on both sides of the path; afterwards one crosses the Cacux river, who has a strong current from South to North". The "ranch" indication means that in those days there was still not a definitive human settlement, while the deep ravines come from the fact that Canillá is located in the Sierra de Chuacús mountains.

=== After the Independence of Central America ===
El Quiché Department was established by executive action of 12 February 1872, which formed it from land coming from Sololá and Totonicapán; in that executive action, a town called Caniyá is mentioned.

In 1880, in the Population Census of that year, Canillá is listed as a settlement belonging to San Andrés Sajcabajá. In the census, Canillá is a "settlement of the El Quiché Department, distant 51 km from Santa Cruz del Quiché, the department capital; and 607 inhabitants, who work in agriculture for the most part; there are not real industries in the area."

Canillá was elevated to municipality by an executive action of president José María Reina Barrios on 21 March 1893. The municipality was suppressed, however, by an executive action of president Jorge Ubico on 26 August 1936 and went back to San Andrés Sajcabajá as a human settlement. Years later, yet another executive action, this time of president Jacobo Árbenz Guzmán, on 13 November 1951, reestablished the municipality under the same circumstances it was on 26 August 1936, when it was merged into San Andrés Sajcabajá.

In May 1970 a school was built; the new structure had six classrooms, lunch room, warehouse, guardian room and the basic utilities. In the municipality there is a health center from the Secretariat of Public Health, which also started selling medications in early 1973. And as of 5 July 1973, the municipality had the authority to lease those municipal lots within its jurisdiction.

== Economy ==
Canillá is an isolated city dependent on subsistence farming. Crops include corn, platanos, and other tropical fruits and vegetables. The small central city has the Municipal offices, a library, post office, and stores, including telephone services. Manufacturing includes brick making.

The main roads connecting Canillá to San Andrés Sajcabajá and Santa Cruz del Quiché, or Zacualpa and Joyabaj are unpaved and can be precarious in the rainy season; they suffer from erosion, potholes and landslides. The poor state of the roads seriously limits Canillá's access to regional markets.

Employment opportunities in Canillá are few. Many people from Canillá travel for work, either to other areas of Guatemala, or to Mexico or the United States. One group from Canillá works in Tuscarawas County, Ohio.

== Mayan Ruins at Chijoj, called "Los Cerritos" ==
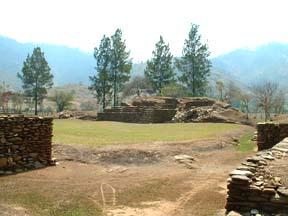
The Mayan ruins at Chijoj

Outside Canillá past the Aldea (village) Chijoj are the Mayan ruins, called "Los Cerritos" (Spanish: "Little Hills"). The ruins present several patterns of pyramid, square and rectangle. It has a large sports field where Mayans used to play. It looks like a large swimming pool. The road from Canillá to Chijoj continues, in good weather, to the ruins.

== See also ==
- Cubulco
- El Quiché
- Sacapulas
- San Andrés Sajcabajá
