= Pachalum =

- Municipality
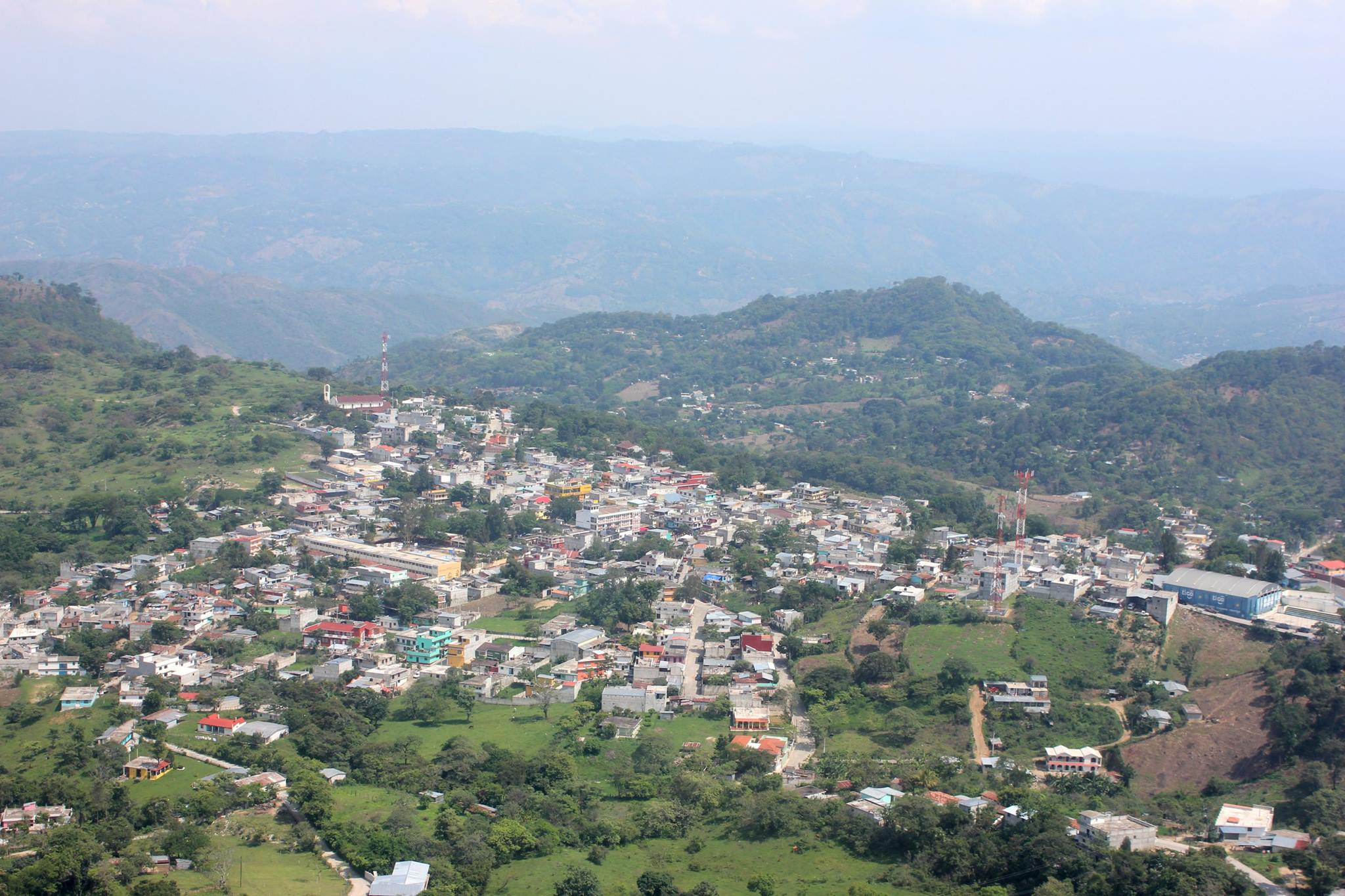

- Location in El Quiché Department Pachalum (Guatemala)
- Coordinates: 14°55′37″N 90°39′54″W
- Country: Guatemala
- Department: El Quiché
- Municipality: Pachalúm
- Established: 1986

Government
  - Type: Municipal

Area
  - Municipality: 100 km^{2} (39 sq mi)

Population (Census 2002)
  - Municipality: 7,037
  - Urban: 2,042
  - Ethnicities: K'iche' Ladino
  - Religions: Roman Catholicism Evangelicalism Maya
- Climate: Aw

Pachalúm is a municipality in the Guatemalan department of El Quiché.

Pachalúm had been a village in the municipality of Joyabaj, but was recognized as separate municipality in 1986.

== History ==
The name «Pachalum» originated from the Pachecas' game which men practiced under the shadow of a "Chalum" tree during the early years of the 20th century.

=== During the Spanish colony ===
José de Alvarado —relative of conquistador Pedro de Alvarado— was given from the Kingdom of Guatemala authorities more than one hundred fifty acres of land in the Santa María Xoyavaj region, dando origen a los establecimientos de colonizadores españoles en la región. Pachalúm was mentioned for the first time in 1817, as place for sugar production settled by Spanish families that arrived there from San Martín Jilotepeque, Santa Cruz El Chol and from most of the modern Baja Verapaz Department.

=== After Independence from Spain ===
After the revolution against field marshal Vicente Cerna y Cerna in 1871, the families of the revolutionary leaders that helped the Liberal revolt asked Joyabaj mayor that their settlement became a village, which was granted on 9 August 1872.

== Administrative division ==
The municipality has an area of 100 km; besides the municipal capital, there are eight villages, thirteen settlements and five farm fields.

División administrativa de Pachalúm
Division	Name	Settlements
Villages	Las Moritas	El Naranjito
Villages	Los Altos	Piedras Blancas
Villages	El Cimarrón	Caseríos Toro Seco, Las Minas y San José El Jute
Villages	El Ciprés	Ciprés Segundo Centro
Villages	Llano Grande	San Vicente
Villages	Agua Zarca	Tamarindo y Trapichitos
Villages	Volcancillos	Veguitas de Mercedes, Guachipilín, El Anono y Tablones
Villages	Las Vegas	N/A
Farm fields	La Laguna Seca	
Farm fields	San Isidro	
Farm fields	El Maguey	
Farm fields	San Miguel	
Farm fields	Incienso	

== Topography ==
Pachalúm is located in Sierra de Chuacús, specifically at the bottom of Tuncaj Hill, where several sprinkles come down. It is also close to the Motagua river basin, cuyos afluentes, los ríos Las Vegas y Tumbadero, humedecen el terreno de la localidad.

== Municipal government and infrastructure ==
The first elections ever held in Pachalúm resulted in victory of Vicente de la Roca in 1986, but his term was not that effective due to the lack of experience on managing a municipality; the next mayor was Rafael Elías who focused on the area development. Afterwards, teach Reynabel Estrada Roca was elected, serving for three terms.

Among those projects finished during Estrada Roca's term in office are:

- paved road between Pachalúm and Guatemala City, via Concuán
- Grocery market building
- Municipal Hotel
- Sports complex
- Urban area pavement
- irrigation project, led by Hugo Lorenzo Duarte Estrada

Other important access roads to Pachalúm are:

- Pachalúm -Chimaltenango, via San Martín Jilotepeque, 70% paved
- Pachalum - Santa Cruz del Quiché, 92 km long, with 16 km unpaved
- Pachalum - Cubulco, 20 km long

== Climate ==
Pachalúm has a tropical savanna climate (Köppen: Aw).

Climate data for Pachalúm
Month	Jan	Feb	Mar	Apr	May	Jun	Jul	Aug	Sep	Oct	Nov	Dec	Year
Mean daily maximum °C (°F)	26.5 (79.7)	27.3 (81.1)	28.8 (83.8)	28.9 (84.0)	28.7 (83.7)	27.4 (81.3)	27.3 (81.1)	27.4 (81.3)	26.8 (80.2)	26.5 (79.7)	26.4 (79.5)	26.3 (79.3)	27.4 (81.2)
Daily mean °C (°F)	20.0 (68.0)	20.1 (68.2)	21.8 (71.2)	22.4 (72.3)	22.7 (72.9)	22.3 (72.1)	22.1 (71.8)	21.9 (71.4)	21.6 (70.9)	21.2 (70.2)	20.4 (68.7)	19.7 (67.5)	21.3 (70.4)
Mean daily minimum °C (°F)	13.5 (56.3)	13.6 (56.5)	14.9 (58.8)	16.0 (60.8)	16.7 (62.1)	17.3 (63.1)	17.0 (62.6)	16.5 (61.7)	16.4 (61.5)	15.9 (60.6)	14.5 (58.1)	13.2 (55.8)	15.5 (59.8)
Average precipitation mm (inches)	3 (0.1)	7 (0.3)	12 (0.5)	35 (1.4)	111 (4.4)	247 (9.7)	168 (6.6)	127 (5.0)	208 (8.2)	121 (4.8)	28 (1.1)	5 (0.2)	1,072 (42.3)
Source: Climate-Data.org

== See also ==
- El Quiché Department
