= San Andrés Sajcabajá =

- Municipality
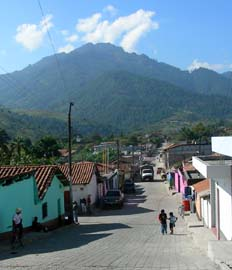
- Street scene in San Andrés Sajcabajá, November 2006

- Location in Guatemala
- Coordinates: 15°10′32″N 90°56′30″W
- Country: Guatemala
- Department: El Quiché
- Municipality: San Andrés Sajcabajá

Government
  - Type: Municipal

Area
  - Municipality: 446 km^{2} (172 sq mi)
- Elevation: 1,200 m (3,900 ft)
- Highest elevation: 2,200 m (7,200 ft)
- Lowest elevation: 1,000 m (3,300 ft)

Population (Census 2002)
  - Municipality: 19,035
  - Urban: 1,875
  - Ethnicities: K'iche' (89%) Ladino (11%)
  - Religions: Roman Catholicism Evangelicalism Maya
- Climate: Am
- Website: Site

San Andrés Sajcabajá (Spanish pronunciation: [san anˈdɾes saxkaβaˈxa]) is a municipality in the Guatemalan department of El Quiché. The municipality is formed by the town San Andrés Sajcabajá, and 62 rural communities. The majority (89%) of its population is ethnic K'iche'.

== History ==
In pre-colonial times, the area was known as Sajcabajá and was populated by one of the lineages of the K'iche' Kingdom of Q'umarkaj. After the defeat of the K'iche', the Spanish colonial presence in Sajcabajá began between 1552 and 1580, when the Dominican convent in Sacapulas was put in charge of the conversión of its population, through the colonial reducciones system. During the colonial era, San Andrés Sajcabajá functioned as a staging place, between Joyabaj and Sacapulas, on the road (camino real) connecting the Guatemalan capital (then located in Tecpán) to Chiapas. San Andrés Sajcabajá was established as a municipality in 1892.

This mural is in the parish hall of the Catholic Church in San Andrés Sajcabajá.

In recent history, San Andrés Sajcabajá suffered the consequences of the 36 year Guatemalan civil war (1960–1996). These consequences were especially hard felt in the years 1981-1984, when the Guatemalan army established a military garrison in the town's Catholic convent, and began a campaign of unprecedented repression against the population.

== Geography ==
The municipality of San Andrés Sajcabajá is situated in the Sierra de Chuacús mountain range. The town and its rural communities are located at an altitude between 1,000 and 2,000 m. Its climate is temperate, with mean temperatures oscillating between 12 °C and 24 °C, and an annual precipitation between 1,000 – 2,000 mm.

As a result of its mountainous character, over 77% of the municipality's territory is too steep to be of any other agricultural use than forestry. The principal agricultural products are maize and beans, which are cultivated for local consumption. Horticulture is only practiced in a small number of communities with access to irrigation. Horticultural products, like tomatoes, onions, cabbage, squash and güisquil, are sold on the local market.
