= Sakapultek =

Sakapultek may refer to

- Sakapultek people, an ethnic subgroup of the Maya
- Sakapultek language, the language spoken by that people
