= Quiché Department =

Department of Guatemala

Quiché Department Departmento de El Quiché
- Department
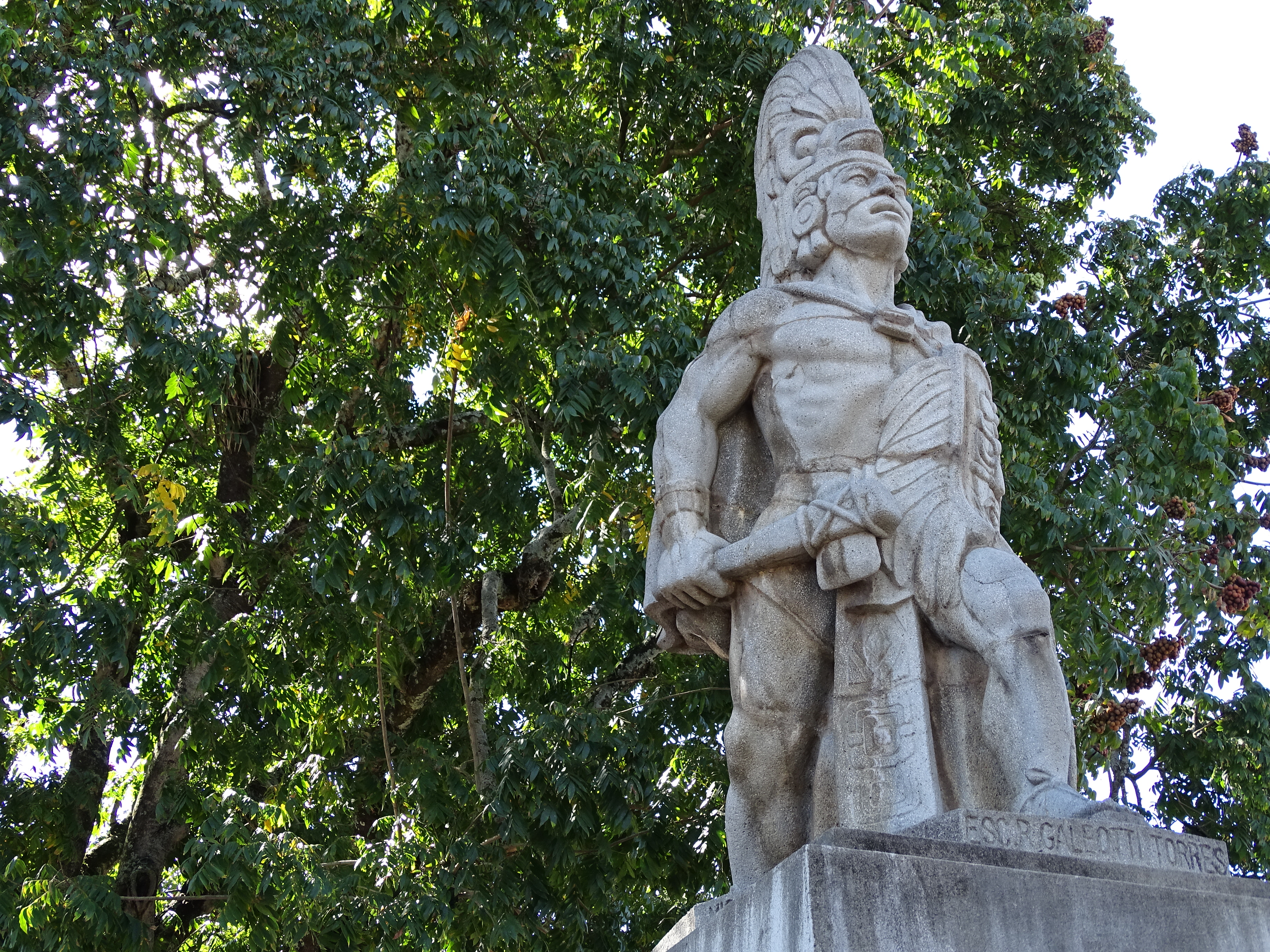
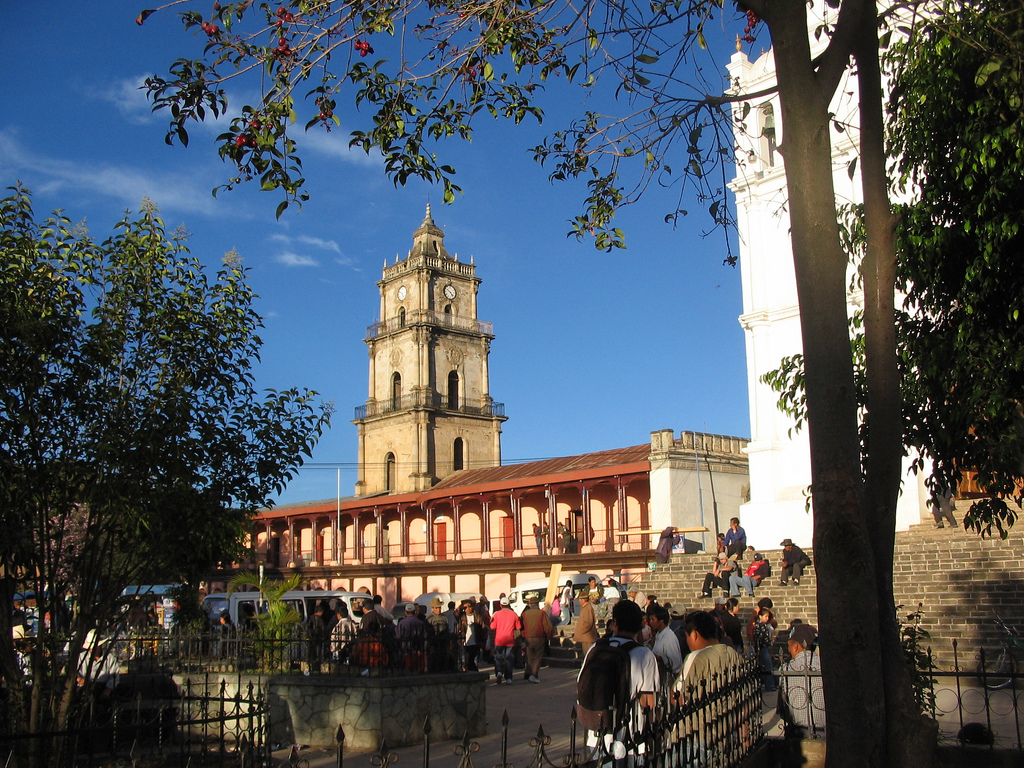
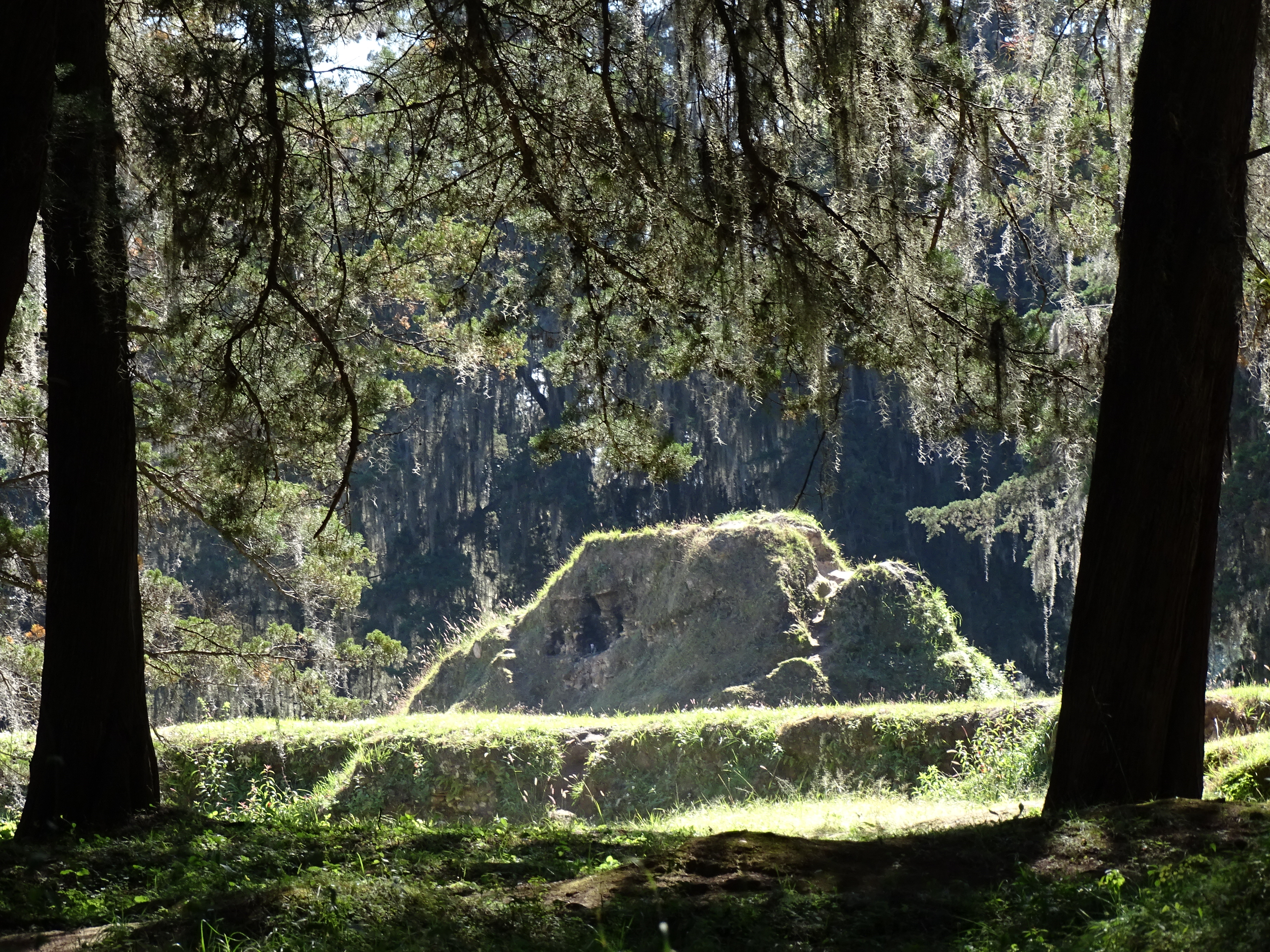
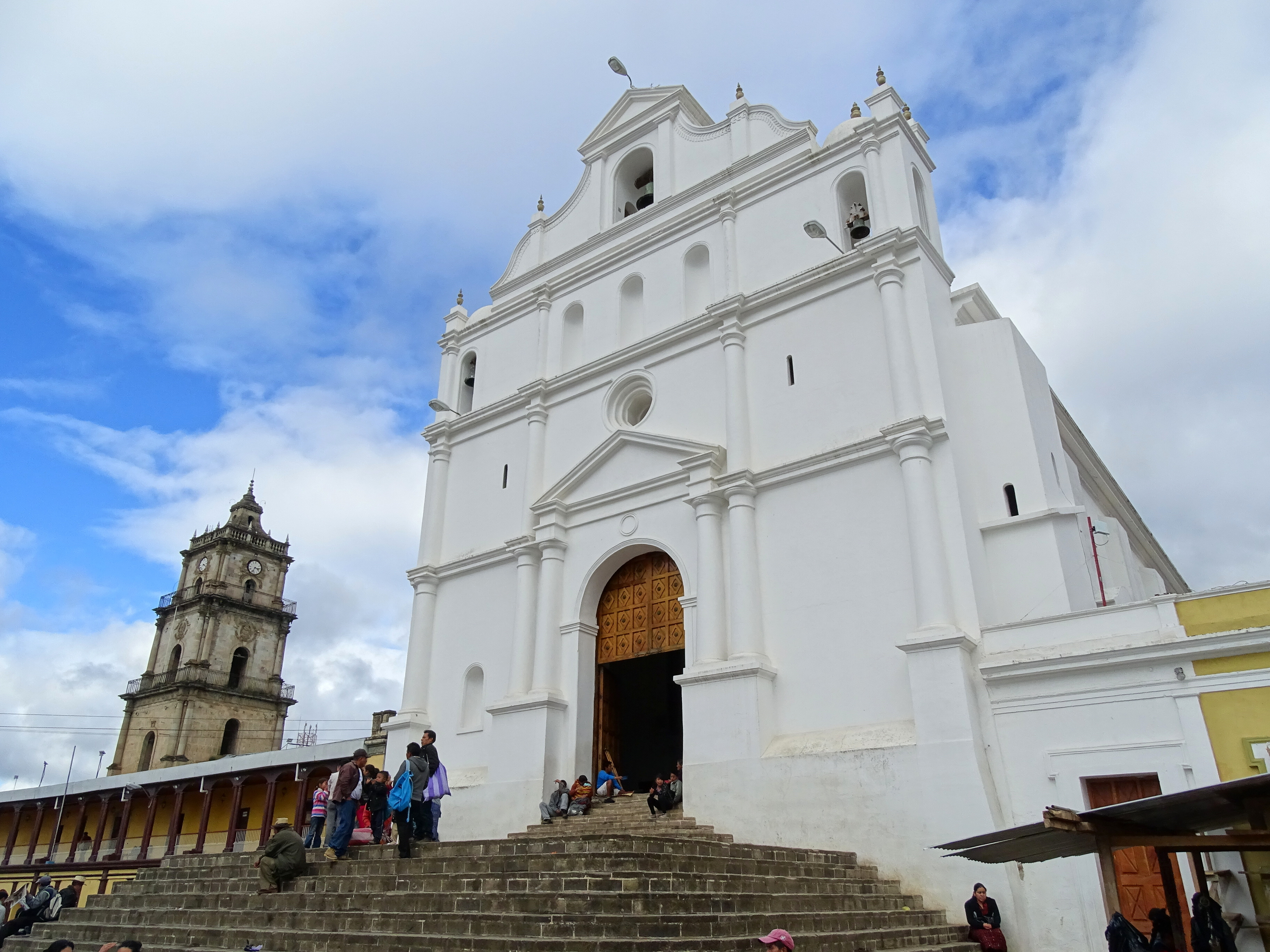
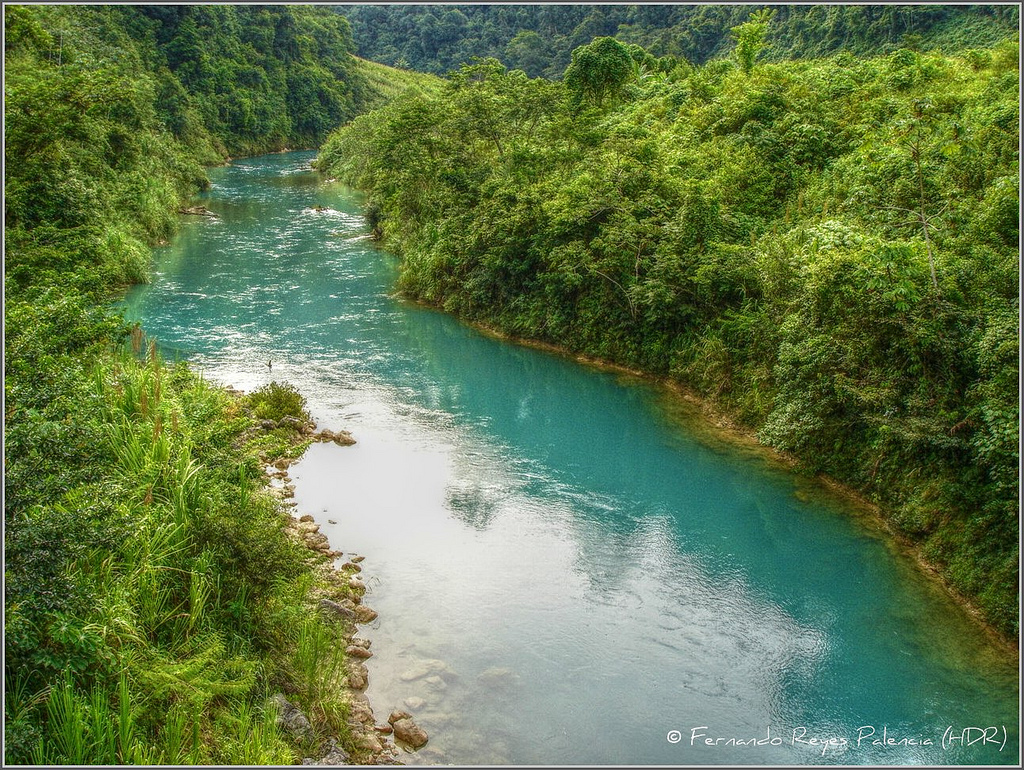
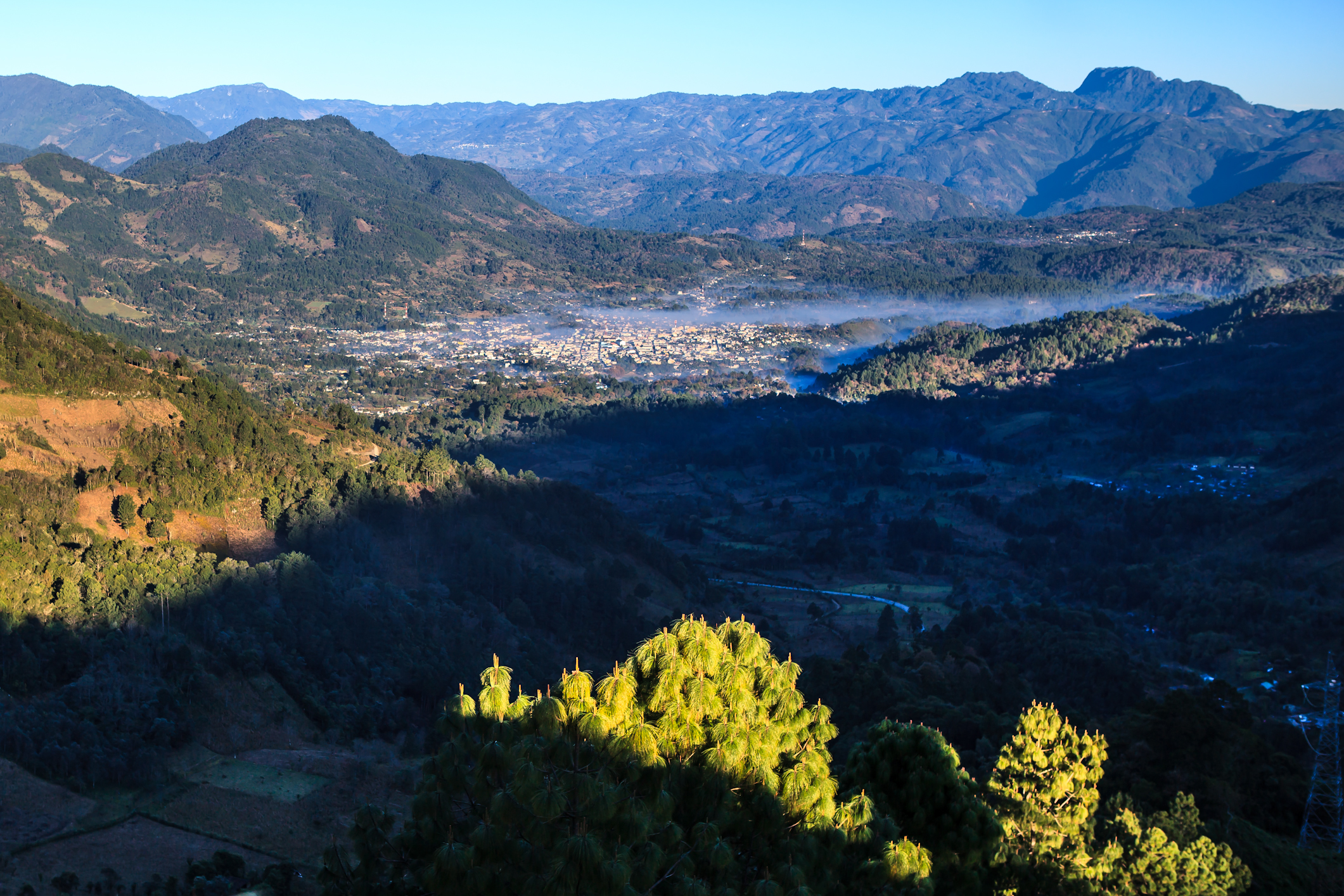
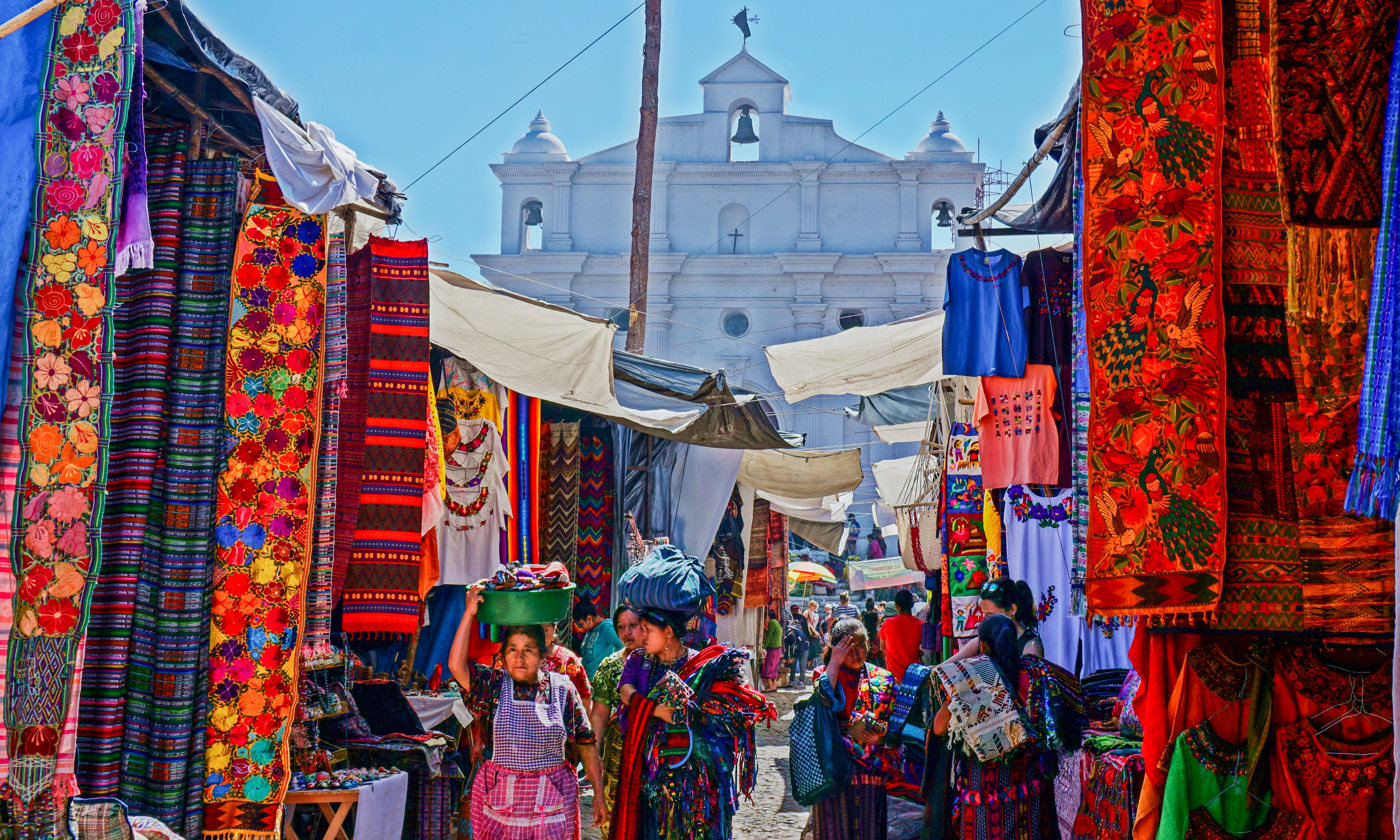
- Statue Tecun Uman Santa Cruz del Quiché Palace Qʼumarkaj Santa Cruz del Quiché Cathedral Chixoy River Sierra de los Cuchumatanes Chichicastenango

- Flag Coat of arms

- Coordinates: 15°1′48″N 91°9′0″W
- Country: Guatemala
- Capital: Santa Cruz del Quiché
- Largest city: Chichicastenango
- Municipalities: 21

Government
  - Type: Departmental
  - Governor: Otto Ervin Macz Hó

Area
  - Department: 8,378 km^{2} (3,235 sq mi)
- Highest elevation: 3,200 m (10,500 ft)
- Lowest elevation: 150 m (490 ft)

Population (2018)
  - Department: 949,261
  - Density: 113.3/km^{2} (293.5/sq mi)
  - Urban: 306,569
  - Ethnicities: Kʼicheʼ; Ixil; Uspantek; Sakapultek; Poqomchiʼ; Ladino
  - Religions: Roman Catholicism; Evangelicalism; Maya
- Time zone: UTC-6
- ISO 3166 code: GT-QC

Quiché (Spanish pronunciation: [kiˈtʃe]) is a department of Guatemala. It is in the heartland of the Kʼicheʼ (Quiché) people, one of the Maya peoples, to the north-west of Guatemala City. The capital is Santa Cruz del Quiché. The word Kʼicheʼ comes from the language of the same name, which means "many trees".

== Population ==
Quiché has historically been one of the most populous departments of Guatemala. At the 2018 census it had a population of 949,261. Mayans account for 88.6% of the department's population. Kʼicheʼ people are the largest Mayan ethnic group in the department, and account for 65.1% of the total population. The department is named after them.

While most of its indigenous population speaks the Kʼicheʼ (Quiché) language, other Mayan languages spoken in the department are Ixil (Nebaj - Chajul - Cotzal area), Uspantek (Uspantán area), Sakapultek (Sacapulas area), as well as Poqomchiʼ and Q'eqchi' in the northeast, bordering the Alta Verapaz department.

== Geography ==
The topographical composition of Quiché is dominated by the central highlands and the mountain ranges of the Sierra de los Cuchumatanes, Sierra de Chuacús, and the foothills of the volcanic mountain range on the department's South-Western border with Chimaltenango, which together make up for 79% of the department's territory. The northern part of the department is formed by tropical lowlands which cover 21% of the department's territory.

The principal drainage basins in El Quiché are the Salinas, Motagua, Xaclbal and Ixcán river basins. The Salinas river basin (3668 km2), includes the Chixoy River which is a tributary of the Río Salinas and Río Usumacinta. The Motagua basin (1042 km2) includes the Río Grande which is an important tributary of the Río Motagua. The smaller Xaclbal (779 km2) and Ixcán basins (187 km2) are situated in the North-East of El Quiché. El Quiché has a small number of shallow lakes ("lagunas"): laguna de Lemoa and the laguna de La Estancia, both in Santa Cruz del Quiché, and the laguna de San Antonio in San Antonio Ilotenango.

== Tourism ==
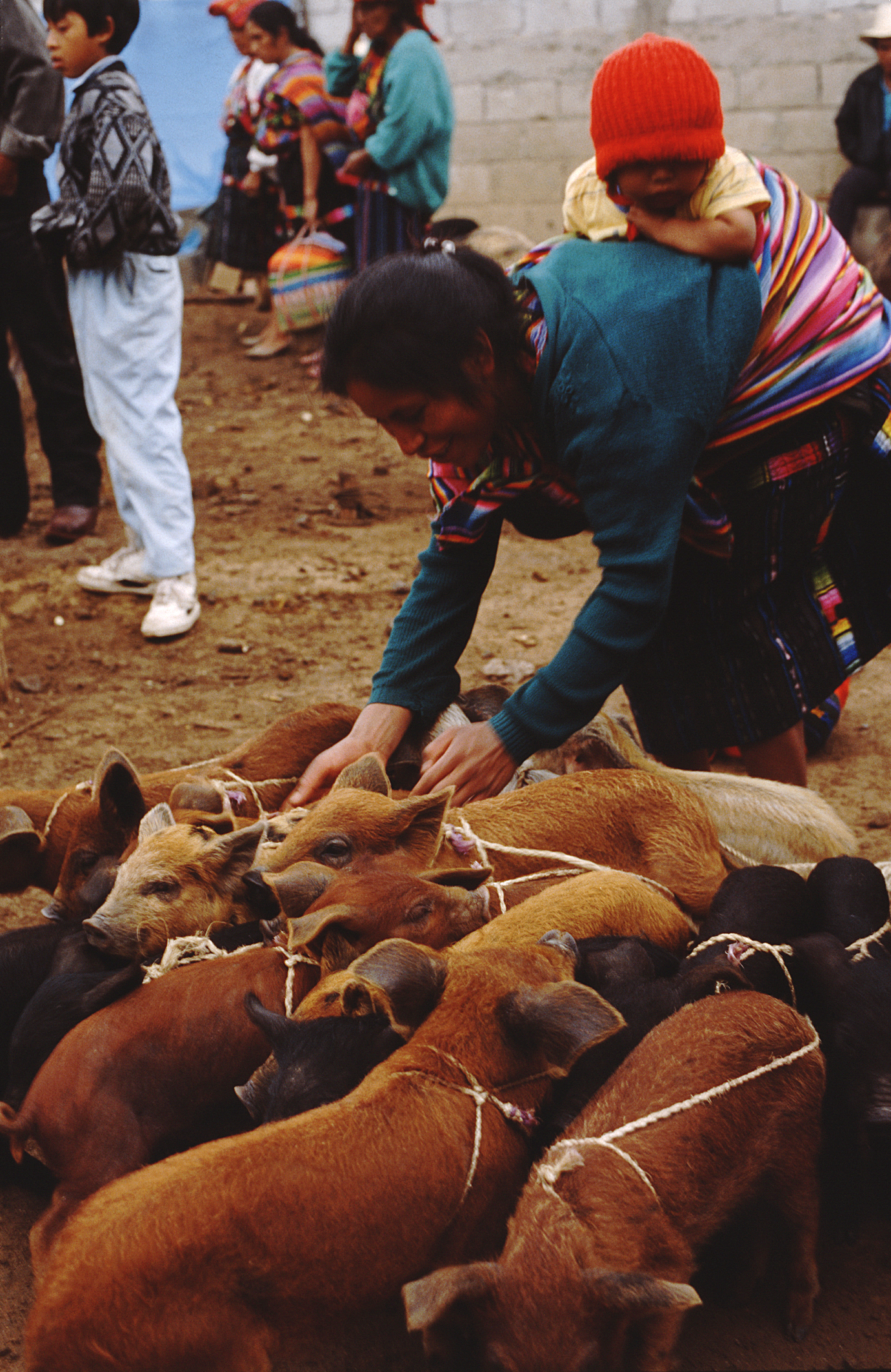
Chichicastenango Market, 1996

Places of interest in the department include the town of Chichicastenango and the ruins of Q'umarkaj. The department has several pre-colonial archeological sites, including Q'umarkaj (near Santa Cruz del Quiché), Pascual Abaj (in Chichicastenango), Cerro de San Andrés (in San Andrés Sajcabajá), Chutixtiox (near Sacapulas), Los Cerritos and La Laguna (in Canillá). Most of these sites are used as ceremonial centers in the Maya religion.

A regional museum can be found in Chichicastenango and Nebaj.

Though not as well known as the Santo Tomás church in Chichicastenango most other towns in the department have catholic churches dating from the colonial era.

The Visis Cabá biosphere reserve (450 km^{2}) is the only protected natural reserve in El Quiché. It is located in the North of Chajul, on the communal lands of the Ixil communities. The creation of protected natural reserves is being considered for El Amay in Chicamán and La Vega del Zope in Chinique.

== Crime ==
Crime in the Quiché department is low, the homicide rate of 3 per 100,000 people is more akin to Western Europe than to the Guatemalan region in general.

== Municipalities ==
The department is divided into 21 municipalities:

1. Canillá
2. Chajul
3. Chicamán
4. Chiché
5. Chichicastenango
6. Chinique
7. Cunén
8. Joyabaj
9. Nebaj
10. Sacapulas
11. Patzité
12. Pachalúm
13. Ixcán
14. San Andrés Sajcabajá
15. San Antonio Ilotenango
16. San Bartolomé Jocotenango
17. San Juan Cotzal
18. San Pedro Jocopilas
19. Santa Cruz del Quiché
20. Uspantán
21. Zacualpa
