= San Antonio Ilotenango =

- Municipality
- Location in Guatemala
- Coordinates: 15°03′16″N 91°13′46″W
- Country: Guatemala
- Department: El Quiché
- Municipality: San Antonio Ilotenango

Government
  - Type: Municipal

Population (Census 2002)
  - Municipality: 17,204
  - Urban: 1,762
  - Ethnicities: K'iche' Ladino
  - Religions: Roman Catholicism Evangelicalism Maya
- Climate: Cwb

San Antonio Ilotenango is a municipality in the Guatemalan department of El Quiché.
