= San Bartolomé Jocotenango =

- Municipality
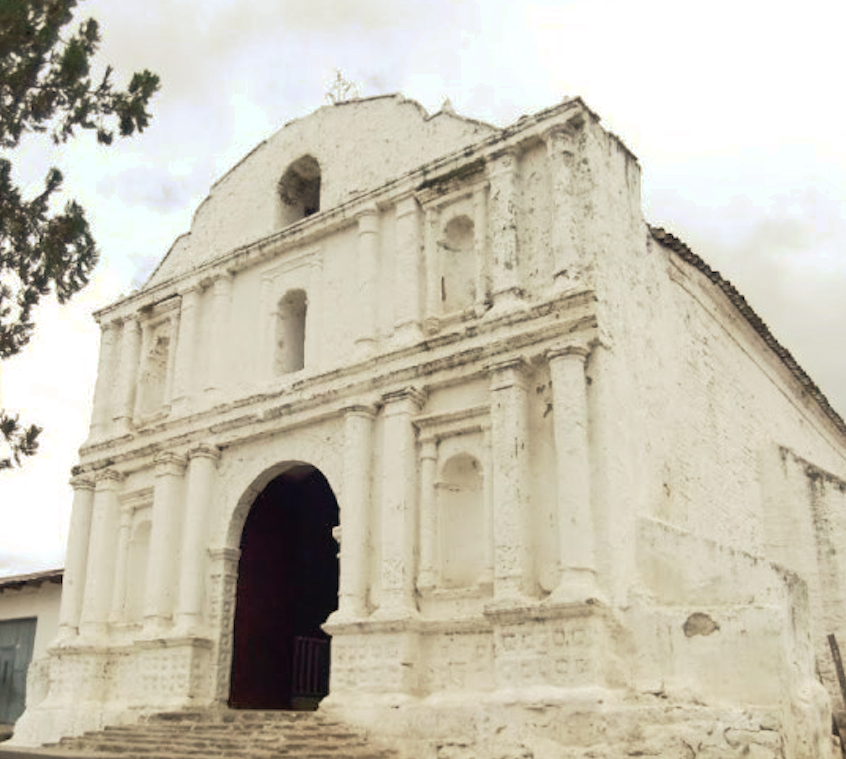

- Location in Guatemala
- Coordinates: 15°11′34″N 91°4′39″W
- Country: Guatemala
- Department: El Quiché
- Municipality: San Bartolomé Jocotenango

Government
  - Type: Municipal

Area
  - Municipality: 47 sq mi (123 km^{2})
- Elevation: 5,003 ft (1,525 m)

Population (Census 2002)
  - Municipality: 8,639
  - Urban: 1,312
  - Ethnicities: K'iche' (99%) Ladino (1%)
  - Religions: Roman Catholicism Evangelicalism Maya
- Climate: Aw
- Website: Site

San Bartolomé Jocotenango is a municipality in the Guatemalan department of El Quiché.

The celebrations for the town's patron saint, San Bartolomé Apóstol, are on 22-25 of August.
