= Chiché, Guatemala =

Chiché
- Municipality
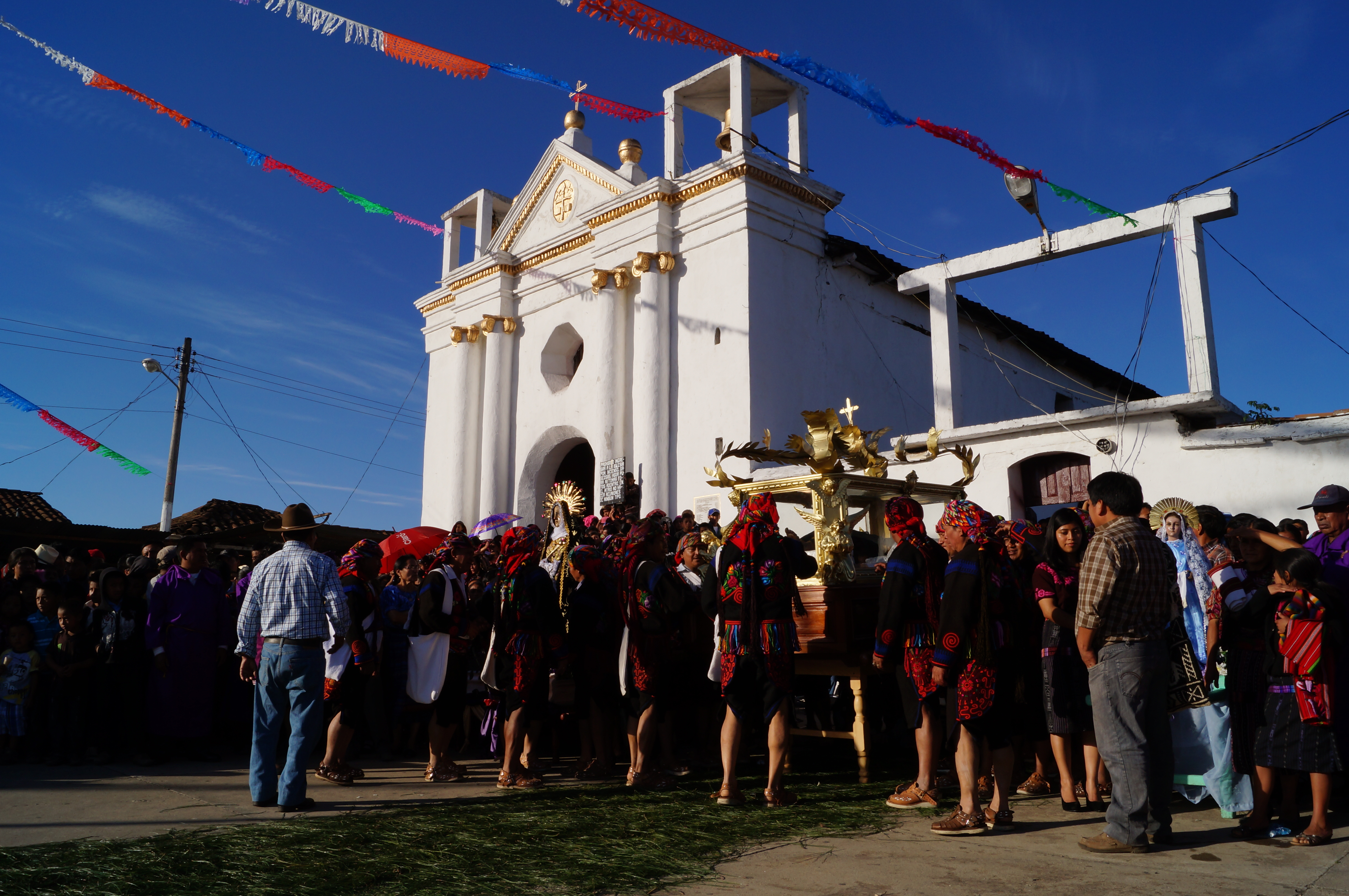

- Location in Guatemala
- Coordinates: 15°00′38″N 91°03′54″W
- Country: Guatemala
- Department: El Quiché
- Municipality: Chiché

Government
  - Type: Municipal
  - Mayor: Andrés Tzoc Sucuquí

Area
  - Municipality: 144 km^{2} (56 sq mi)
- Elevation: 2,000 m (6,600 ft)

Population (Census 2002)
  - Municipality: 19,762
  - Urban: 2,167
  - Ethnicities: K'iche' (95%) Ladino (5%)
  - Religions: Roman Catholicism Evangelicalism Maya
- Climate: Cwb
- Website: Infopressca

Chiché (Spanish pronunciation: [tʃiˈtʃe])is a municipality in the Guatemalan department of El Quiché.
