= Chinique =

- Location in Guatemala
- Country: Guatemala
- Department: El Quiché
- Municipality: Chinique de las Flores

Government
  - Type: Municipal

Area
  - City: 16 sq mi (41 km^{2})
- Highest elevation: 7,580 ft (2,310 m)
- Lowest elevation: 3,924 ft (1,196 m)

Population (Census 2002)
  - City: 8,009
  - Urban: 2,290
  - Ethnicities: K'iche' Ladino
  - Religions: Roman Catholicism Evangelicalism Maya
- Climate: Cwb
- Website: http://www.inforpressca.com/chinique/

Chinique, from the Kʼicheʼ language «chinic´aj taka´aj», is a municipality in the Guatemalan department of El Quiché. In 1892 Alfred Maudslay and his wife Anne reported that the place was a small group of houses made from adobe with thatched roofs. Its population as of 2023 is 14,052.

Climate data for Chinique
Month	Jan	Feb	Mar	Apr	May	Jun	Jul	Aug	Sep	Oct	Nov	Dec	Year
Mean daily maximum °C (°F)	19.8 (67.6)	21.0 (69.8)	22.5 (72.5)	23.3 (73.9)	23.0 (73.4)	21.6 (70.9)	21.3 (70.3)	22.0 (71.6)	21.6 (70.9)	20.8 (69.4)	20.6 (69.1)	20.2 (68.4)	21.5 (70.6)
Daily mean °C (°F)	14.0 (57.2)	14.6 (58.3)	16.0 (60.8)	17.0 (62.6)	17.6 (63.7)	17.0 (62.6)	16.5 (61.7)	16.6 (61.9)	16.6 (61.9)	16.0 (60.8)	15.0 (59.0)	14.4 (57.9)	15.9 (60.7)
Mean daily minimum °C (°F)	8.2 (46.8)	8.3 (46.9)	9.5 (49.1)	10.8 (51.4)	12.3 (54.1)	12.5 (54.5)	11.8 (53.2)	11.2 (52.2)	11.6 (52.9)	11.2 (52.2)	9.4 (48.9)	8.6 (47.5)	10.5 (50.8)
Average precipitation mm (inches)	6 (0.2)	5 (0.2)	12 (0.5)	33 (1.3)	90 (3.5)	239 (9.4)	180 (7.1)	173 (6.8)	193 (7.6)	125 (4.9)	41 (1.6)	5 (0.2)	1,102 (43.3)
Source: Climate-Data.org
