= San Pedro Jocopilas =

- Municipality
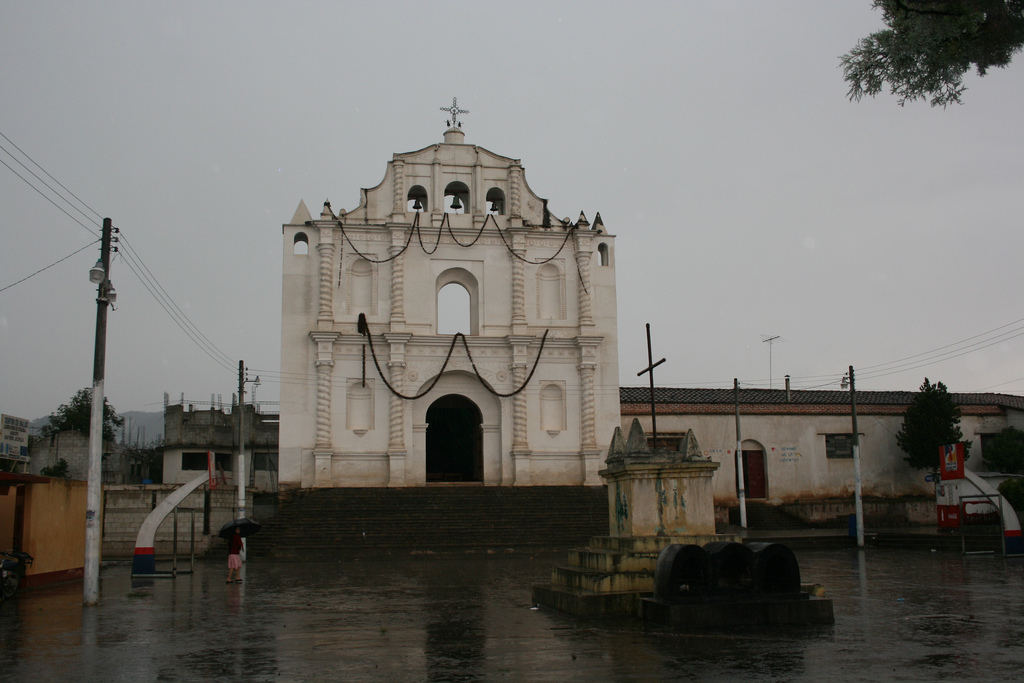

- Location in Guatemala
- Coordinates: 15°05′43″N 91°09′03″W
- Country: Guatemala
- Department: El Quiché
- Municipality: San Pedro Jocopilas

Government
  - Type: Municipal

Population (Census 2002)
  - Municipality: 21,782
  - Urban: 948
  - Ethnicities: K'iche' Ladino
  - Religions: Roman Catholicism Evangelicalism Maya
- Climate: Cwb

San Pedro Jocopilas is a municipality in the Guatemalan department of El Quiché.

== Notable residents ==
- Rigoberta Menchú, Mayan human rights activist, and Nobel Peace Prize laureate
