= Patzité =

- Municipality
- Location in Guatemala
- Coordinates: 14°57′50″N 91°12′29″W
- Country: Guatemala
- Department: El Quiché
- Municipality: Patzité

Government
  - Type: Municipal

Population (Census 2002)
  - Municipality: 4,695
  - Urban: 853
  - Ethnicities: K'iche' Ladino
  - Religions: Roman Catholicism Evangelicalism Maya
- Climate: Cwb

Patzité (Spanish pronunciation: [patsiˈte]) is a municipality in the Guatemalan department of El Quiché.
