= Sakapultek language =

Mayan language of Guatemala

Sakapultek
- Sacapulteco
- Tujaal Tziij
- Native to: Guatemala
- Region: El Quiché
- Ethnicity: 12,900 Sakapultek (2019 census)
- Native speakers: 6,500 (2019 census)
- Language family: Mayan: Quichean–Mamean; Greater Quichean; Sakapultek

Official status
- Recognised minority language in: Guatemala
- Regulated by: Academia de Lenguas Mayas de Guatemala (ALMG)

Language codes
- ISO 639-3: quv
- Glottolog: saca1238
- ELP: Sakapulteko

A Sakapultek speaker from the Academia de Lenguas Mayas de Guatemala

Sakapultek or Sacapulteco is a Mayan language very closely related to Kʼicheʼ (Quiché). It is spoken by approximately 6,500 people in Sacapulas, El Quiché department and in Guatemala City.

== Phonology ==
=== Consonants ===
		Labial	Alveolar		Post- alveolar	Palatal	Velar		Uvular	Glottal
		Labial	plain	sibilant	Post- alveolar	Palatal	plain	pal.	Uvular	Glottal
Plosive/ Affricate	voiceless	p	t	ts	tʃ		k	kʲ	q	ʔ
Plosive/ Affricate	ejective	(pʼ)	tʼ	tsʼ	tʃʼ		kʼ	kʼʲ	qʼ	
Plosive/ Affricate	implosive	ɓ								
Fricative				s	ʃ		x			
Nasal		m	n				ŋ			
Tap			ɾ							
Approximant		w	l			j				

- Plain voiceless stops are aspirated [Cʰ] in syllable-final position.
- /ɓ/ is heard as an ejective [pʼ] or a voiceless implosive [ɓ̥] when before consonants, or in syllable-final or word-final positions.
- /qʼ/ may also be heard as an implosive [ʛ̥] in free variation.

=== Vowels ===
	Front	Central	Back
Close	i iː		u uː
Mid	e eː		o oː
Open		a aː	
