= Sacapulas =

- Municipality
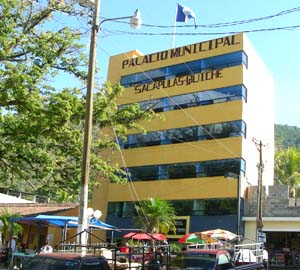
- The Municipal building in Sacapulas

- Location in Guatemala
- Coordinates: 15°17′21″N 91°5′21″W
- Country: Guatemala
- Department: El Quiché
- Municipality: Sacapulas

Government
  - Type: Municipal
  - Mayor (2016–2020): Nery Raúl Quintana Ortiz (UNE)

Area
  - Municipality: 114 sq mi (294 km^{2})
- Elevation: 3,900 ft (1,200 m)

Population (Census 2018)
  - Municipality: 52,620
  - Density: 464/sq mi (179/km^{2})
  - Urban: 12,225
  - Ethnicities: Sakapultek K'iche' Ladino
  - Religions: Roman Catholicism Evangelicalism Maya
- Climate: Am

Sacapulas is a town and municipality in the Guatemalan department of El Quiché.

== History ==
=== Pre Hispanic era ===
Worried about the defection of the aj K’ub’ul family chief -who had taken his family away in order to look for fertile and, above all, pacific land-, the K’iche’ king sent a group of soldiers to control every single movement of them. He was afraid that the aj K'ub'ul would look for reinforcements from other ethnic group in the area to form a strong army and then attack the k'iche's. The warriors settled to the east of the aj K’ub’ul and since the latter had moved away to look for peace and tranquility, they were a very peaceful community. And that is exactly what the warriors inform the K’iche’ king, reassuring him by telling that he should not worry about the exiled group, as they were really peaceful.

As time went by, the k'iche' warriors realized that the aj K'ub'ul life was very different from the one they were used to have under the ruling of their king, as they simple worked on their land and crops and then enjoyed their families without having to worry about being invaded or called to fight in a war. Therefore, they went back to their place of origin, Tujalj (Sacapulas and Canillá)), but only to pick up their families and went on to settle a new community where they were once stationed to keep an eye on the aj K'ub'ul. (Note: This was confirmed by Antonio Rodríguez, from Sacapulas, who witnessed the contact his family had with Rabinal, San Miguel Chicaj and Salamá in the 1950s. They knew that their families were related and always brought Sacapulas produce into those municipalities.)

=== Campaigns in the Cuchumatanes ===
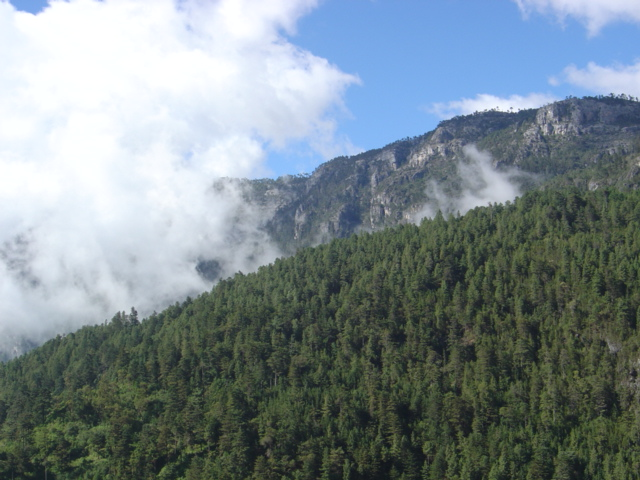
The difficult terrain and remoteness of the Cuchumatanes made their conquest difficult.

In the ten years after the fall of Zaculeu various Spanish expeditions crossed into the Sierra de los Cuchumatanes and engaged in the gradual and complex conquest of the Chuj and Q'anjob'al. The Spanish were attracted to the region in the hope of extracting gold, silver and other riches from the mountains but their remoteness, the difficult terrain and relatively low population made their conquest and exploitation extremely difficult. The population of the Cuchumatanes is estimated to have been 260,000 before European contact. By the time the Spanish physically arrived in the region this had collapsed to 150,000 because of the effects of the Old World diseases that had run ahead of them.

==== Uspantán and the Ixil ====
After the western portion of the Cuchumatanes fell to the Spanish, the Ixil and Uspantek Maya were sufficiently isolated to evade immediate Spanish attention. The Uspantek and the Ixil were allies and in 1529, four years after the conquest of Huehuetenango, Uspantek warriors were harassing Spanish forces and Uspantán was trying to foment rebellion among the K'iche'. Uspantek activity became sufficiently troublesome that the Spanish decided that military action was necessary. Gaspar Arias, magistrate of Guatemala, penetrated the eastern Cuchumatanes with sixty Spanish infantry and three hundred allied indigenous warriors. By early September he had imposed temporary Spanish authority over the Ixil towns of Chajul and Nebaj. The Spanish army then marched east toward Uspantán itself; Arias then received notice that the acting governor of Guatemala, Francisco de Orduña, had deposed him as magistrate. Arias handed command over to the inexperienced Pedro de Olmos and returned to confront de Orduña. Although his officers advised against it, Olmos launched a disastrous full-scale frontal assault on the city. As soon as the Spanish began their assault they were ambushed from the rear by more than two thousand Uspantek warriors. The Spanish forces were routed with heavy losses; many of their indigenous allies were slain, and many more were captured alive by the Uspantek warriors only to be sacrificed on the altar of their deity Exbalamquen. The survivors who managed to evade capture fought their way back to the Spanish garrison at Q'umarkaj.

A year later Francisco de Castellanos set out from Santiago de los Caballeros de Guatemala (by now relocated to Ciudad Vieja) on another expedition against the Ixil and Uspantek, leading eight corporals, thirty-two cavalry, forty Spanish infantry and several hundred allied indigenous warriors. The expedition rested at Chichicastenango and recruited further forces before marching seven leagues northwards to Sacapulas and climbed the steep southern slopes of the Cuchumatanes. On the upper slopes they clashed with a force of between four and five thousand Ixil warriors from Nebaj and nearby settlements. A lengthy battle followed during which the Spanish cavalry managed to outflank the Ixil army and forced them to retreat to their mountaintop fortress at Nebaj. The Spanish force besieged the city, and their indigenous allies managed to scale the walls, penetrate the stronghold and set it on fire. Many defending Ixil warriors withdrew to fight the fire, which allowed the Spanish to storm the entrance and break the defences. The victorious Spanish rounded up the surviving defenders and the next day Castellanos ordered them all to be branded as slaves as punishment for their resistance. The inhabitants of Chajul immediately capitulated to the Spanish as soon as news of the battle reached them. The Spanish continued east towards Uspantán to find it defended by ten thousand warriors, including forces from Cotzal, Cunén, Sacapulas and Verapaz. The Spaniards were barely able to organise a defence before the defending army attacked. Although heavily outnumbered, the deployment of Spanish cavalry and the firearms of the Spanish infantry eventually decided the battle. The Spanish overran Uspantán and again branded all surviving warriors as slaves. The surrounding towns also surrendered, and December 1530 marked the end of the military stage of the conquest of the Cuchumatanes.

=== Pacific conquest by the Dominican friars ===
On his second visit to Guatemala, in 1537, friar Bartolomé de las Casas, O.P. wanted to employ his new method of conversion based on two principles: 1) to preach the Gospel to all men and treat them as equals, and 2) to assert that conversion must be voluntary and based on knowledge and understanding of the Faith. It was important for Las Casas that this method be tested without meddling from secular colonists, so he chose a territory in the heart of Guatemala where there were no previous colonies and where the natives were considered fierce and war-like. Because it had not been possible to conquer the land by military means, the governor of Guatemala, Alonso de Maldonado, agreed to sign a contract promising that if the venture was successful he would not establish any new encomiendas in the area. Las Casas's group of friars established a Dominican presence in Rabinal, Sacapulas and Cobán, reaching as far as Chahal. Through the efforts of Las Casas' missionaries the so-called "Land of War" came to be called "Verapaz", "True Peace". Las Casas's strategy was to teach Christian songs to merchant Indian Christians who then ventured into the area. In this way he was successful in converting several native chiefs, among them those of Atitlán and Chichicastenango, and in building several churches in the territory named Alta Verapaz. These congregated a group of Christian Indians in the location of what is now the town of Rabinal. In 1538 Las Casas was recalled from his mission by Bishop Francisco Marroquín who wanted him to go to Mexico and then on to Spain in order to seek more Dominicans to assist in the mission.

=== Monastery and doctrine of Order of Preachers ===
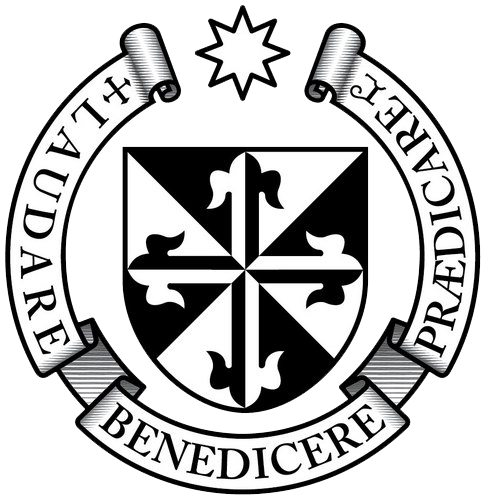
Order of Preachers coat of arms.

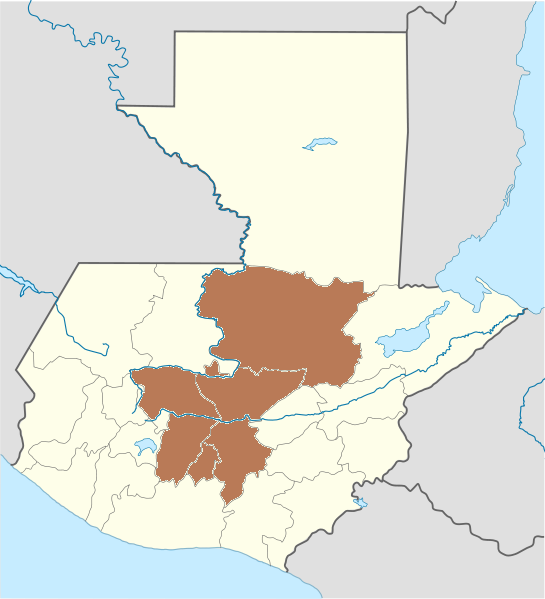
Order of Preachers convents during the Spanish colony en Guatemala and the approximate area of their surrounding doctrines

After the conquest, the Spanish crown focused on the Catholic indoctrination of the natives. Human settlements founded by royal missionaries in the New World were called "Indian doctrines" or simply "doctrines". Originally, friars had only temporary missions: teach the Catholic faith to the natives, and then transfer the settlements to secular parishes, just like the ones that existed in Spain at the time; the friars were supposed to teach Spanish and Catholicism to the natives. And when the natives were ready, they could start living in parishes and contribute with mandatory tithing, just like the people in Spain.

But this plan never materialized, mainly because the Spanish crown lost control of the regular orders as soon as their friars set course to America. Shielded by their apostolic privileges granted to convert natives into Catholicism, the missionaries only responded to their order local authorities, and never to that of the Spanish government or the secular bishops. The orders local authorities, in turn, only dealt with their own order and not with the Spanish crown. Once a doctrine had been established, the protected their own economic interests, even against those of the King and thus, the doctrines became Indian towns that remains unaltered for the rest of the Spanish colony.

The doctrines were founded at the friars discretion, given that they were completely at liberty to settle communities provided the main purpose was to eventually transfer it as a secular parish which would be tithing of the bishop. In reality, what happened was that the doctrines grew uncontrollably and were never transferred to any secular parish; they formed around the place where the friars had their monastery and from there, they would go out to preach to settlements that belong to the doctrine and were called "annexes", "visits" or "visit towns". Therefore, the doctrines had three main characteristics:

1. they were independent from external controls (both ecclesiastical and secular)
2. were run by a group of friars
3. had a relatively larger number of annexes.

The main characteristic of the doctrines was that they were run by a group of friars, because it made sure that the community system would continue without any issue when one of the members died.

In 1638, the Order of Preachers split their large doctrines —which meant large economic benefits for them— in groups centered around each one of their six monasteries, including the Sacapulas monastery:

Order of Preachers' doctrines in Guatemala in 1638
Convent	Doctrines	Convent	Doctrines
Guatemala	Chimaltenango; Jocotenango; Sumpango; San Juan Sacatepéquez; San Pedro Sacatepéquez; Santiago Sacatepéquez; Rabinal; San Martín Jilotepeque; Escuintla; Milpas Altas; Milpas Bajas; San Lucas Sacatepéquez; Santo Domingo neighborhood	Amatitlán	Amatitlán; Petapa; Mixco; San Cristóbal
Guatemala	Chimaltenango; Jocotenango; Sumpango; San Juan Sacatepéquez; San Pedro Sacatepéquez; Santiago Sacatepéquez; Rabinal; San Martín Jilotepeque; Escuintla; Milpas Altas; Milpas Bajas; San Lucas Sacatepéquez; Santo Domingo neighborhood	Verapaz	Cahabón; Cobán; Chamelco; San Cristóbal; Tactic
Guatemala	Chimaltenango; Jocotenango; Sumpango; San Juan Sacatepéquez; San Pedro Sacatepéquez; Santiago Sacatepéquez; Rabinal; San Martín Jilotepeque; Escuintla; Milpas Altas; Milpas Bajas; San Lucas Sacatepéquez; Santo Domingo neighborhood	Sonsonate	Nahuizalco; Tacuxcalco
San Salvador	Apastepeque; Chontales; Cojutepeque; Cuscatlán; Milpas Bajas; Tonacatepeque	Sacapulas	Sacapulas; Cunén; Nebaj; Santa Cruz; San Andrés Sajcabajá; Zacualpa; Chichicastenango

In 1754, the Order of Preachers had to transfer all of their doctrines and convents to the secular clergy, as part of the Bourbon reforms.

=== After the independence of Central America ===
After the independence of Central America in 1821 began the Central American Civil War between the conservatives that wanted to keep the regular orders and aristocrats in control, and the liberals who wanted to expel them. In 1829, after general Francisco Morazán's victory, the conservative regime of Mariano de Aycinena y Piñol was taken down and both his family and associated and the regular clergy were expelled from Central America, leaving behind only secular clergy priests, although heavily weakened, given that mandatory tithing was abolished. This heavily impacted Sacapulas, as the Order of Preachers was forced to leave the country leaving their doctrines and monastery behind.

After the conservatives regained power in 1840, the regular clergy returned to Guatemala, but they were not able to recover their old properties. But they were expelled once again after the Liberal Revolution of 1871 and with the creation of Quiché Department in 1872, Sacapulas was raised to municipality category.

=== Guatemalan Civil War ===
During the Guatemalan Civil War Sacapulas found itself in the area where the Ejército Guerrillero de los Pobres -one of the guerrilla organizations that operated in Guatemala- was active. This organization justified its terrorist attacks against private and public infrastructure by saying that they only impacted the economic interests of both State and the country's productive sector and that it made the Guatemalan Army more vulnerable. In the Comisión para el Esclarecimiento Histórico final report, former EGP members said that "destroying infrastructure just under the concept of destroying the country's infrastructure, to damage the country, that did not happen. There was always an explanation... in context with the war that we were sustaining at the time and in context within the tactic moment when we were going to blow up a bridge, yes, we were going to blow it up so that the Army could not go through and to stop it from its barbarism... to cut its advances and withdraws- But from Nentón to the North, the highway was closed [end of 1981 to beginning of 1982], the Army did not get in, not a single authority would come in, and the telegraph posts -which were the other communication device that existed- were taken down". "When we cut power to some (Army) barracks the power to the closest towns and village was cut as well, creating resentment in the population. Afterwards, the sabotages were commonplace in order to create chaos along the country and preparing the conditions of a pre insurrection state".

The EGP attacks that affected Cunén were:

Date	Target	Result
16 November 1981	State Power Institute facilities in Santa Cruz del Quiché	Left without power all of the nearby municipalities.
18 December 1981	«El Tesoro» Bruidge in Quiché Department	The bridge was completely destroyed, cutting any Army access.
21 December 1981	Cunén's town hall building and telegraph facilities	Set the buildings on fire to destroy any civil records.
19 January 1982	State Power Institute facilities in Santa Cruz del Quiché	Left without power all of the nearby municipalities.
27 January 1982	Bridges that communicated to San Miguel Uspantán, Nebaj and Chajul in Quiché Department	Completely destroyed both bridges, cutting any access to the Army.

In order to counterattack the guerrilla offensive after the victory of the Sandinista Revolution in Nicaragua in 1979, general Lucas García's government began a "Scorched earth" offensive of its own in the area controlled by the Ejército Guerrillero de los Pobres, -Chajul, Nebaj and Ixcán in Quiché Department-i.e., agricultural and oil-reach region of the Northern Transversal strip-; as part of this offensive, there were intense attacks on civil communities with resulted in massacres that were duly recorded in both the REHMI and Comisión para el Esclarecimiento Histórico final reports.

In several cases, massacres occurred either at a special day for a community or during large scale operatives with large military force displays and aviation backup. The airplanes bombed certain zones; at least one of each nine communities suffered a bombing associated to a massacre, either in the previous or following days. The areas more heavily bombed were the Ixil triangle and Sacapulas, some parts of Baja Verapaz Department and also from Huehuetenango Department. After an attack of this kind it was common that up to 40% of the surviving population left town to survive, going into the mountains, into exile in Mexico or to another community. The maya k'iche' population that looked for refuge in the mountains was labeled as "guerrilla" by the Army, which tighten military controls around them and continuous attacks that made extremely had to get food or medical attention. These people remained in the mountains for almost two years until they finally moved to Las Guacamayas, where they became isolated due to the military pressure. A lot of people died of starvation.

Specifically in Sacapulas, State Armed Forces would have perpetrated the following massacres:

Date	Location
April 1980	Parraxtut village
April 1980	Río Blanco village
September 1981	Tzununul village
December 1981	Guantajau village
February 1982	Tierra Colorada village
March 1982	Parraxtut village
March 1982	Tierra Caliente village
March 1982	Sacapulas villa
May 1982	Guantajau village
May 1982	Sacapulas villa
August 1982	Río Blanco village
April 1983	Salinas Magdalena village

=== 21st century ===
In 2006, Sacapulas was connected by a new paved road to Aguacatán and to Nebaj. This road will give the entire area new access to markets and opportunities for economic development.

== Archeological site ==
Xutixtiox (or Chutix Tiox, Chotaxtiox) is an archeological site located in Sacapulas.

== Climate ==
Sacapulas has a tropical savanna climate (Köppen: Aw).

Climate data for Sacapulas (1991–2020)
Month	Jan	Feb	Mar	Apr	May	Jun	Jul	Aug	Sep	Oct	Nov	Dec	Year
Record high °C (°F)	37.0 (98.6)	38.0 (100.4)	41.0 (105.8)	39.0 (102.2)	38.5 (101.3)	37.0 (98.6)	35.0 (95.0)	35.6 (96.1)	35.5 (95.9)	36.0 (96.8)	35.5 (95.9)	35.0 (95.0)	41.0 (105.8)
Mean daily maximum °C (°F)	29.1 (84.4)	30.6 (87.1)	32.2 (90.0)	33.4 (92.1)	32.3 (90.1)	30.3 (86.5)	29.9 (85.8)	30.6 (87.1)	30.2 (86.4)	29.3 (84.7)	28.6 (83.5)	28.6 (83.5)	30.4 (86.7)
Daily mean °C (°F)	20.5 (68.9)	21.7 (71.1)	22.9 (73.2)	24.3 (75.7)	24.2 (75.6)	23.1 (73.6)	22.7 (72.9)	23.1 (73.6)	22.8 (73.0)	22.1 (71.8)	21.1 (70.0)	20.5 (68.9)	22.4 (72.3)
Mean daily minimum °C (°F)	13.2 (55.8)	13.7 (56.7)	14.7 (58.5)	16.3 (61.3)	17.5 (63.5)	17.6 (63.7)	16.9 (62.4)	17.0 (62.6)	17.5 (63.5)	16.8 (62.2)	14.9 (58.8)	13.6 (56.5)	15.8 (60.4)
Record low °C (°F)	1.3 (34.3)	3.3 (37.9)	3.3 (37.9)	9.2 (48.6)	10.0 (50.0)	4.5 (40.1)	12.8 (55.0)	10.4 (50.7)	13.1 (55.6)	10.4 (50.7)	4.8 (40.6)	3.7 (38.7)	1.3 (34.3)
Average precipitation mm (inches)	2.2 (0.09)	1.0 (0.04)	10.3 (0.41)	35.7 (1.41)	87.0 (3.43)	187.0 (7.36)	95.9 (3.78)	120.6 (4.75)	180.0 (7.09)	105.3 (4.15)	29.4 (1.16)	6.1 (0.24)	860.5 (33.88)
Average precipitation days (≥ 1.0 mm)	0.7	0.3	1.5	3.8	6.7	14.5	10.4	10.7	14.9	9.7	3.2	0.9	77.3
Source: NOAA

== Geographic location ==
Sacapulas is surrounded mostly by El Quiché municipalities

== See also ==
- Bartolomé de las Casas
- El Quiché
- Guatemala Civil War
- Luis de Cancer
- Spanish conquest of Guatemala

== Notes and references ==
=== Bibliography ===
- Belaubre, Christopohe (2001). "Poder y redes sociales en Centroamérica: el caso de la Orden de los Dominicos (1757-1829)" (PDF). Mesoamérica (in Spanish). 41. Archived from the original (PDF) on 21 January 2015.
- Comisión para el Esclarecimiento Histórico: Vol. IV (1999). "Atentados contra sedes municipales". Guatemala: Memoria del Silencio (in Spanish). Programa de Ciencia y Derechos Humanos, Asociación Americana del Avance de la Ciencia. Archived from the original (online edition) on 6 May 2013.
- Juarros, Domingo (1818). Compendio de la historia de la Ciudad de Guatemala (in Spanish). Guatemala: Ignacio Beteta.
- Limón Aguirre, Fernando (2008). "La ciudadanía del pueblo chuj en México: Una dialéctica negativa de identidades" (PDF) (in Spanish). San Cristóbal de Las Casas, Mexico: El Colegio de la Frontera Sur – Unidad San Cristóbal de Las Casas. Archived from the original (PDF) on 2012-07-22.
- Lovell, W. George (2005). Conquest and Survival in Colonial Guatemala: A Historical Geography of the Cuchumatán Highlands, 1500–1821 (3rd ed.). Montreal, Canada: McGill-Queen's University Press. ISBN 0-7735-2741-9. OCLC 58051691.
- van Oss, Adriaan C. (1986). Catholic Colonialism: A Parish History of Guatemala, 1524-1821. Cambridge, UK: Cambridge University Press. ISBN 9780521527125.
- Wagner, Henry Raup; Parish, Helen Rand (1967). The Life and Writings of Bartolomé de Las Casas. University of New Mexico Press.
