= Danza de los Voladores =

Mesoamerican rite

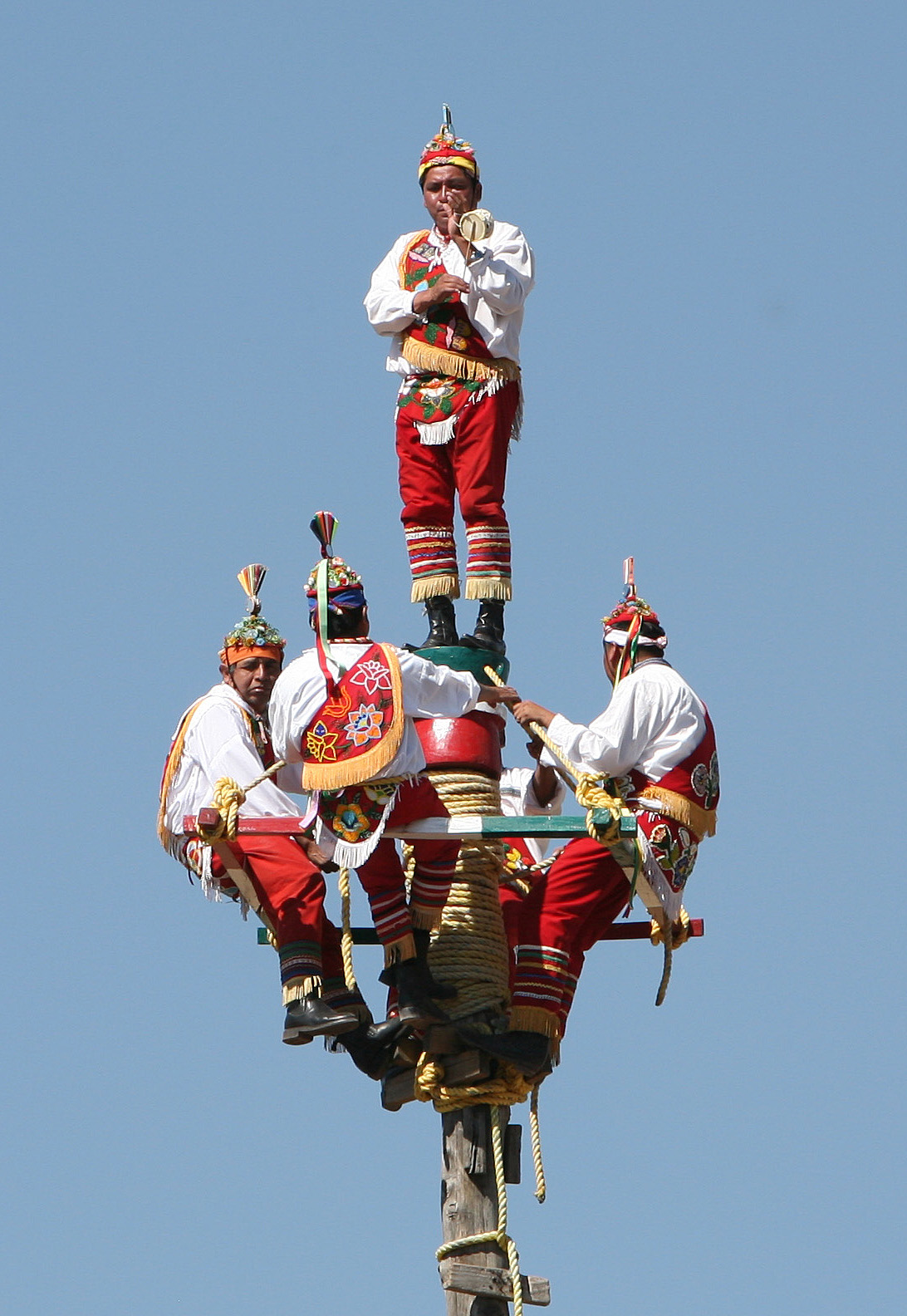
Flying Men starting their dance, Teotihuacan

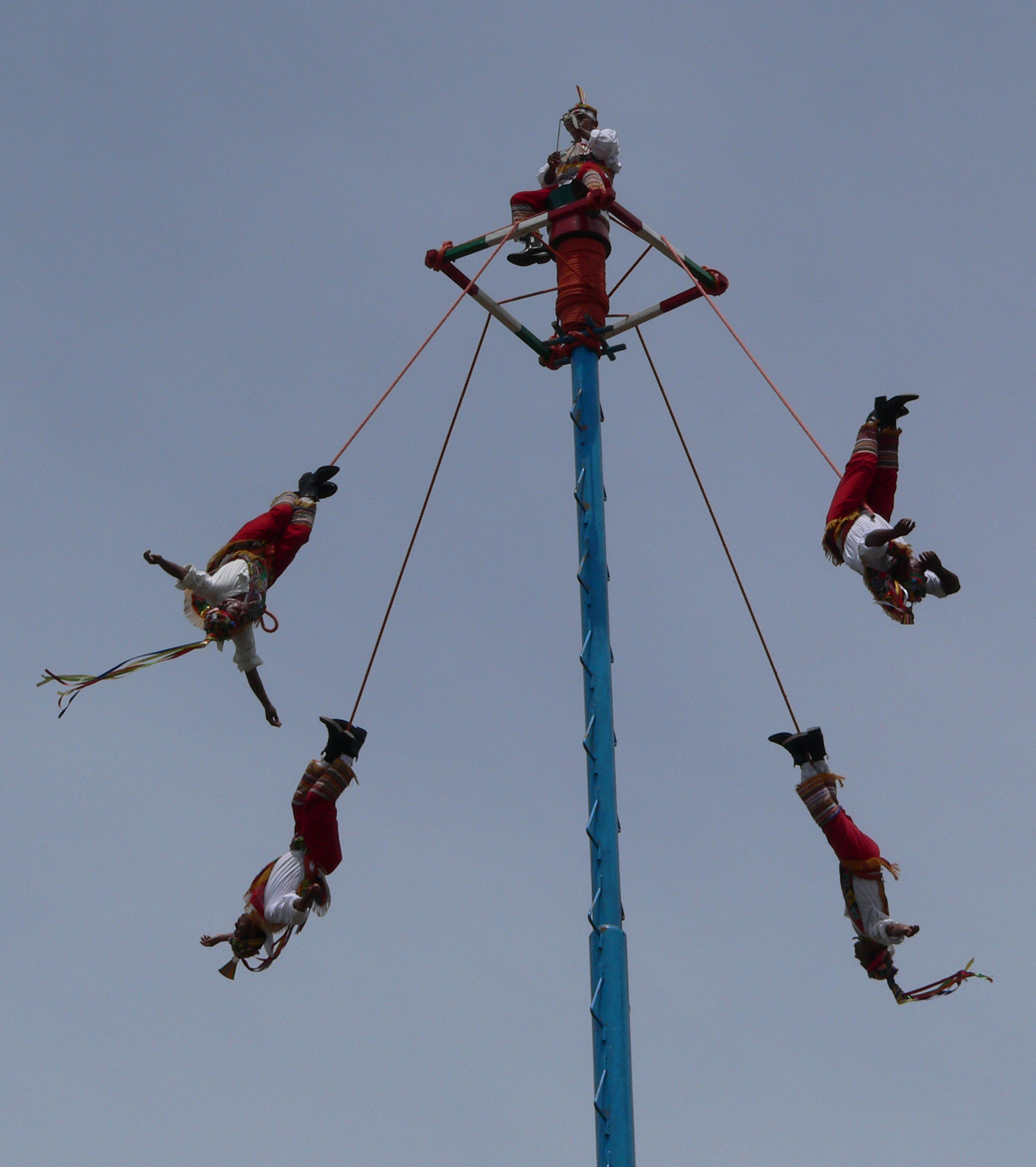
Totonacs of Papantla, Veracruz performing the "voladores" ritual

Short video of Voladores ritual dance, Cozumel, MX

The Danza de los Voladores (Spanish pronunciation: [ˈdansa ðe los βolaˈðoɾes]; "Dance of the Flyers"), or Palo Volador (pronounced [ˈpalo βolaˈðoɾ]; "flying pole"), is an ancient Mesoamerican ceremony/ritual still performed today, albeit in modified form, in isolated pockets in Mexico. It is believed to have originated with the Nahua, Huastec and Otomi peoples in central Mexico, and then spread throughout most of Mesoamerica. The ritual consists of dance and the climbing of a 30-meter (98 ft 5 in) pole from which four of the five participants then launch themselves tied with ropes to descend to the ground. The fifth remains on top of the pole, dancing and playing a flute and drum. According to one myth, the ritual was created to ask the gods to end a severe drought. Although the ritual did not originate with the Totonac people, today it is strongly associated with them, especially those in and around Papantla in the Mexican state of Veracruz. The ceremony was named an Intangible cultural heritage by UNESCO in order to help the ritual survive and thrive in the modern world. The Aztecs believed that Danza de los Voladores was the symbol of their culture.

== History ==
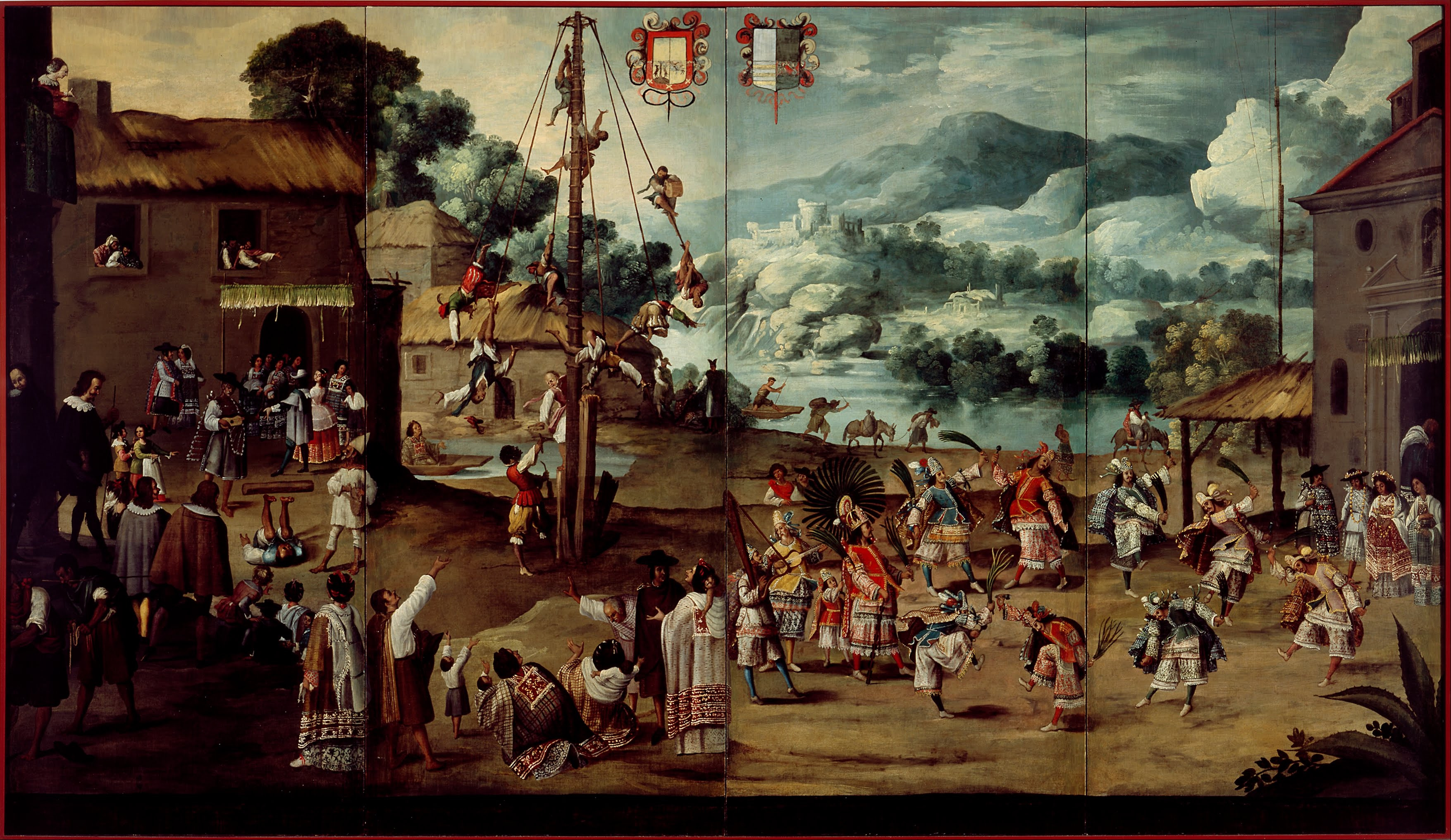
Mexican Indian wedding and voladores, c. 1690

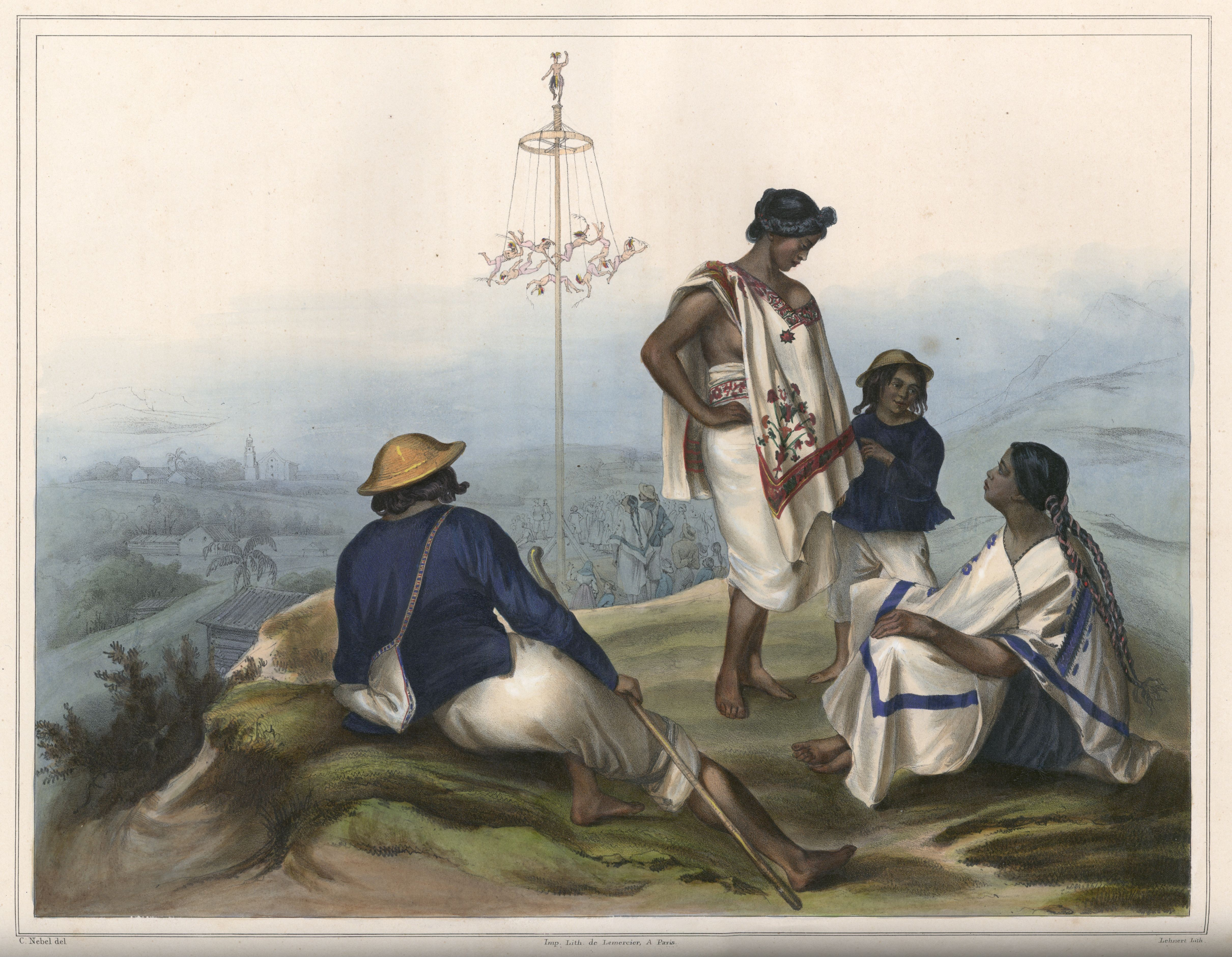
Voladores c. 1836, by Carl Nebel

According to Totonac myth, at least 450 years ago there was a severe drought that brought hunger to the people. The gods were withholding the rain because the people had neglected them. The ceremony was created, to appease the gods and bring back the rains. In some versions of the story, the ritual is created by the old men of a village, who then chose five young men who were chaste. In other versions, the five men themselves create the ritual. The tallest tree in the nearby forest is cut down, with the permission of the mountain god, stripped of branches and dragged to the village. The trunk is erected with much ceremony. The youths climb the pole and four jump off while the fifth played music. The ritual pleased the rain god Tlaloc and other gods, so the rains began again and the fertility of the earth returned.

The exact origin of this ritual/dance is unknown, but it is thought to have originated with the Huastec, Nahua and Otomi peoples in Sierra de Puebla and mountain areas of Veracruz. The ritual spread through much of the Mesoamerican world until it was practiced from northern Mexico to Nicaragua. Evidence for the ritual stretches back at least as far as the pre-Classic period according to ceramics found in Nayarit. In pre-Hispanic times, the ritual was far more complex, involving taboos and meditation. The participants were thought to impersonate birds and in some areas were dressed as parrots, macaws, quetzals and eagles. These birds represented the gods of the earth, air, fire, and water. By the 16th century, the ritual was strongly associated with solar ceremonies, such as the spring equinox. The ritual is most closely tied with rain and solar deities such as Xipe Totec and Tlazolteotl.

In Maya mythology the creation of the world is associated with a bird deity (Itzamna) residing at the World Tree (the center of the world). Five "birdmen" at the top of a pole represent bird deities. The main dancer stands in the center and plays a flute, which represents the sound of birds singing. The four other "birdmen" (representing the four directions) spin around the pole to represent the recreation of the world (and the regeneration of life) In the early form, instead of only five men there are six men dressed as birds with each member climbing on top and performing a dance and at the end tied ropes around their waist and who all jump in unison and descend downwards. Many villages in Mexico banned this version of the practice due to injuries and even death.

Diego Durán, who recorded many Aztec customs at the time of the Spanish conquest, described an incident reminiscent of the Danza de los Voladores, where an Aztec prince, Ezhuahuacatl, sacrificed himself by diving from a pole 20 brazas high (probably about 120 feet, a braza being roughly a fathom, i.e. approximately 6 feet). The four modern day voladores typically circle the pole 13 times each, for a total of 52 circuits, or the number of years in the Aztec "calendar round".

The ritual was partially lost after the Conquest, and the Spaniards destroyed many records about it, though Juan de Torquemada preserved a remarkably detailed account. The Church was much against "pagan" rituals such as these after the Conquest and this and many other rituals were silenced or practiced in secret. Much of what is known is due to oral tradition and writing by the first Europeans to come to Mexico. Later, Catholic elements would be added to the ritual, and it became something of a spectacle in the later colonial period. The ritual mostly disappeared in Mexico and Central America with small remnants surviving, including the Totonac people.

Although the ritual did not originate with the Totonacs, today it is often associated with the Totonacs of the Papantla area in Veracruz. In modern times, a number of changes have occurred. Due to the deforestation of much of the Sierra de Puebla and mountain areas of Veracruz, most voladores perform on permanent metal poles, which in Veracruz are often donated by the oil industry. The most controversial change has been the induction of women to perform the ceremony. Traditionally, it has been taboo to allow women to become voladores but a few have become such, all of whom are in Puebla state. One of the first males to train women, Jesús Arroyo Cerón, died when he fell from a pole during the Cumbre Tajín 2006 cultural festival. The elders of the Totonacs believe this was divine retribution and still prohibit the performance of the ritual to women participants.

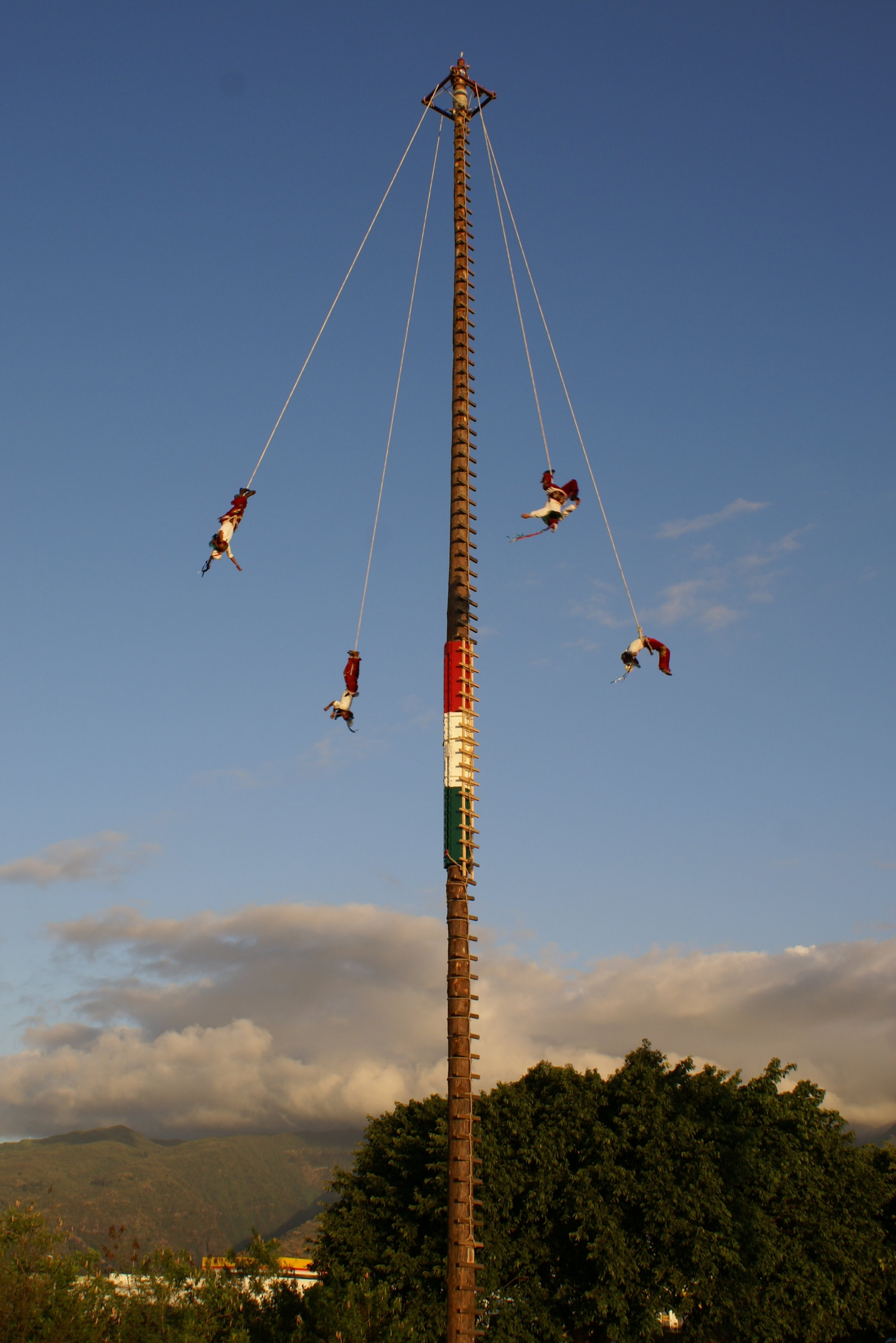
Los Voladores Aztecas performing on Réunion island during a visit in 2008

== Versions ==
In addition to whether or not there is a pole ceremony, other variations in the ritual exist. Among the Nahua and Otomi peoples, there is generally no dance before climbing the pole; the ceremony begins at the top. There is also a version where the suspended frame has five sides instead of four and the ritual involves six dancers and not five. The most traditional time to perform this version is on Holy Thursday at the culmination of a festival held on this day called the Huapangueada. Some dancers have rules to follow such as needing to fast for one or more days before the ceremony and abstain from sexual relations so that the gods will look upon the ceremony favorably. Most of the variations are found in Puebla state. However, the most controversial variation is whether or not to permit women to perform the ritual. In Papantla, which is the community most closely associated with the ritual, the Consejo de Ancianos Totonacas (Council of Totonac Elders) has formally prohibited the inclusion of women. Traditionally, women have been excluded from all Totonac ritual dancing. Even for the dance called La Maringuilla, the female protagonist is portrayed by a man. The prohibition stems from the belief that women are “bad entities, who bring bad luck” and their inclusion would be a sin and/or anger the gods.

However, in a few communities, such as Cuetzalan and Pahuatlán in Puebla and Zozocolco de Hidalgo in Veracruz, women have been allowed to be voladores. Those who are allowed to take part must first complete a series of rituals designed to ask the forgiveness of the gods and Catholic saints for being a woman. The women must also be virgins without a boyfriend if unmarried or abstain from sexual relations before the ritual if married. If a female volador is found to have broken the rules of sexual abstention, she is taken to an altar which is surrounded by incense burners and candles. An image of the Archangel Michael or Saint James bears witness to the punishment, which involves a number of slaps to the face (bofetadas), with the quantity depending on the transgression and the decision of those in charge. It is claimed that the ritual cures “the fever” of the woman. It is believed that women who do not obey these rules will bring calamity to the ritual.

It is not known when the first female was allowed to take part as a volador. One of the first men to train women was Jesús Arroyo Ceron, who trained his daughter Isabel in 1972; after this, he trained his other three daughters. In March 2006, aged 70, he fell from a pole during the Cumbre Tajín celebrations and died. Family members believe he fell “at the side of the gods,” but many patriarchs believe the accident was divine retribution. A wooden cross and flowers at the Plaza del Volador in Parke Takilhsukut memorialize him. Approximately twenty female voladores are known to exist.

In Guatemala the flying pole dance, called Palo volador, is still celebrated in Joyabaj (15 August), Chichicastenango (17–23 January) and Cubulco (26 July).

=== Totonac version ===
According to Totonac myth, the gods told men, “Dance, and we shall observe.” Today, pleasing the gods of old is still a part of the most traditional version of the ritual. The Totonac dress for this ritual consists of red pants with a white shirt, a cloth across the chest and a cap. The pants, hat and chest cloth are heavily embroidered and otherwise decorated. The cloth across the chest symbolized blood. The hat is adorned with flowers for fertility; mirrors represent the sun and from the top stream multicolored ribbons representing the rainbow. These costumes are made by the voladores themselves and can cost between 5,000 and 8,000 pesos each.

The most traditional and lengthy version starts from the selection and cutting of the tree to be used, to the final dance after all voladores have descended from the pole. The tree selection, cutting and erecting ceremony is called the tsakáe kiki. It involves going into the forest to find a suitable tree and asking the permission or the pardon of the mountain god Quihuicolo for taking it. The tree is stripped of its branches and dragged to the ceremonial site, where a hole has been dug for the now-30-meter pole. Before erecting the pole, offerings of flowers, copal, alcohol, candles and live chickens or a live turkey are placed in the hole. These are then crushed as the pole is erected, adding to the fertility of the earth. The pole becomes a connection point between the sky and the earth and the underworld with the surface world, a representation of the world tree, and considered to be the fifth cardinal direction of the earth. The post and the dancers are then purified with alcohol sprinkled in the form of a cross and tobacco smoke.

In most cases, however, the pole used is a permanently placed one, often of steel, and this part of the ceremony does not take place. On these occasions, the ceremony begins with a dance and song type called a “son.” Usually the initial song played and danced to is called the “son of forgiveness.” After this, the five begin to climb the pole with the chief or “caporal” going first. The caporal will not descend but rather will stay at the top of the pole until near the end of the ceremony. The caporal stands on a capstan, called a manzana (apple) which is a small platform at the top of the pole. From this capstan is suspended a square frame called a cuadro (square) on which the other four voladores sit. While these four wind the ropes around the pole and tie themselves to the ends, the caporal plays the flute and drum acknowledging the four cardinal directions, beginning with the east because it is believed life came from this direction. The four ropes are each wound thirteen times for a total of fifty-two, the number of years in a Mesoamerican great year. The caporal then bends fully backwards to acknowledge the sun, playing all the while.

The four voladores represent the four cardinal directions as well as the four elements: earth, air, fire and water. The caporal represents the fifth sun. The four voladores seated on the cuadro face the caporal and at the appropriate moment fall backwards to descend to the ground suspended by the wound ropes. As the ropes unwind, the voladores spin, creating a moving pyramid shape. As the other voladores descend, the caporal plays the “son of goodbye” and dances on the narrow platform. Traditionally, after the descent, there is another dance of goodbye.

== Intangible Cultural Heritage and conservation of the tradition ==
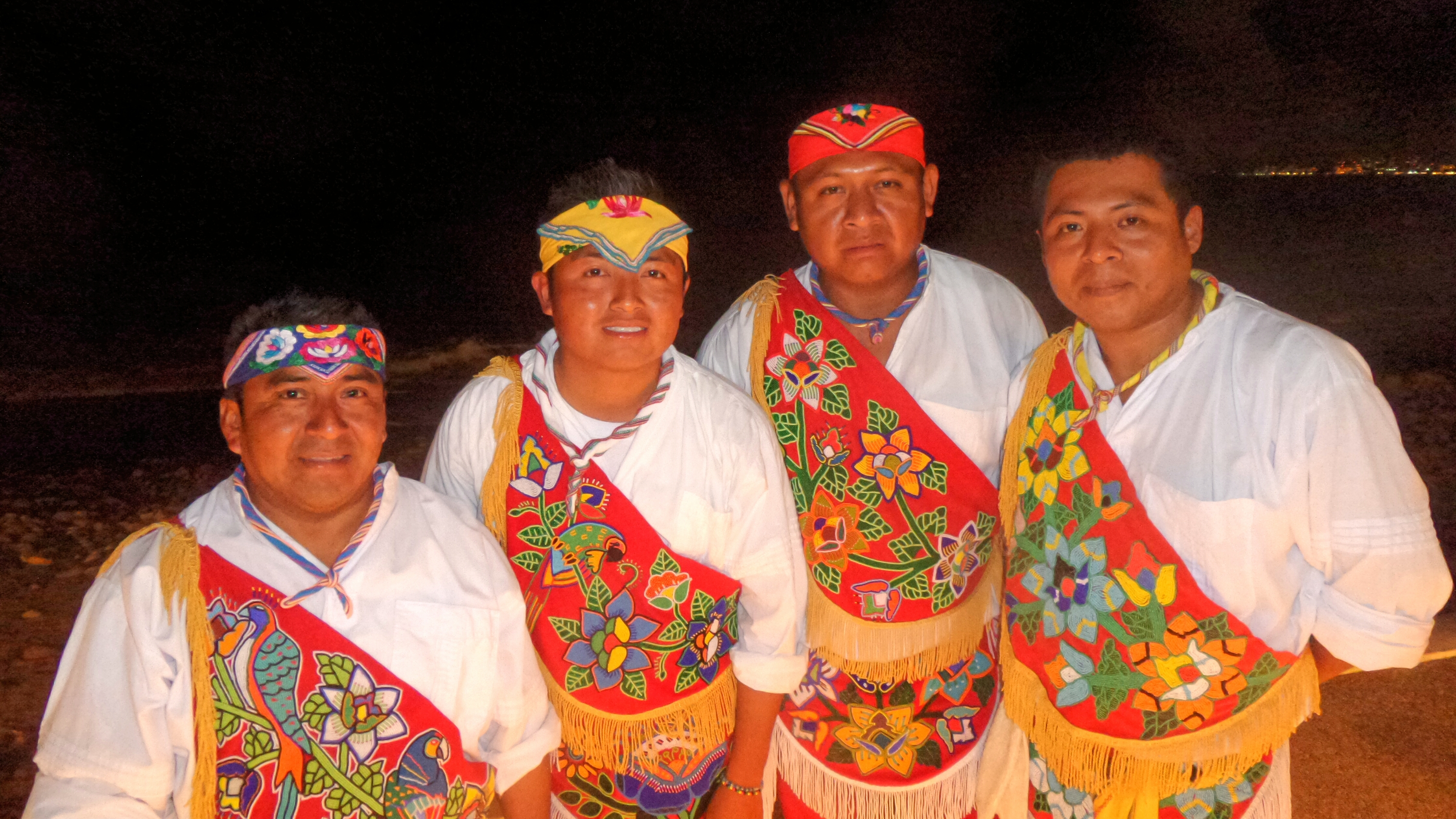
Voladores displaying their regalia used in performance in Puerto Vallarta

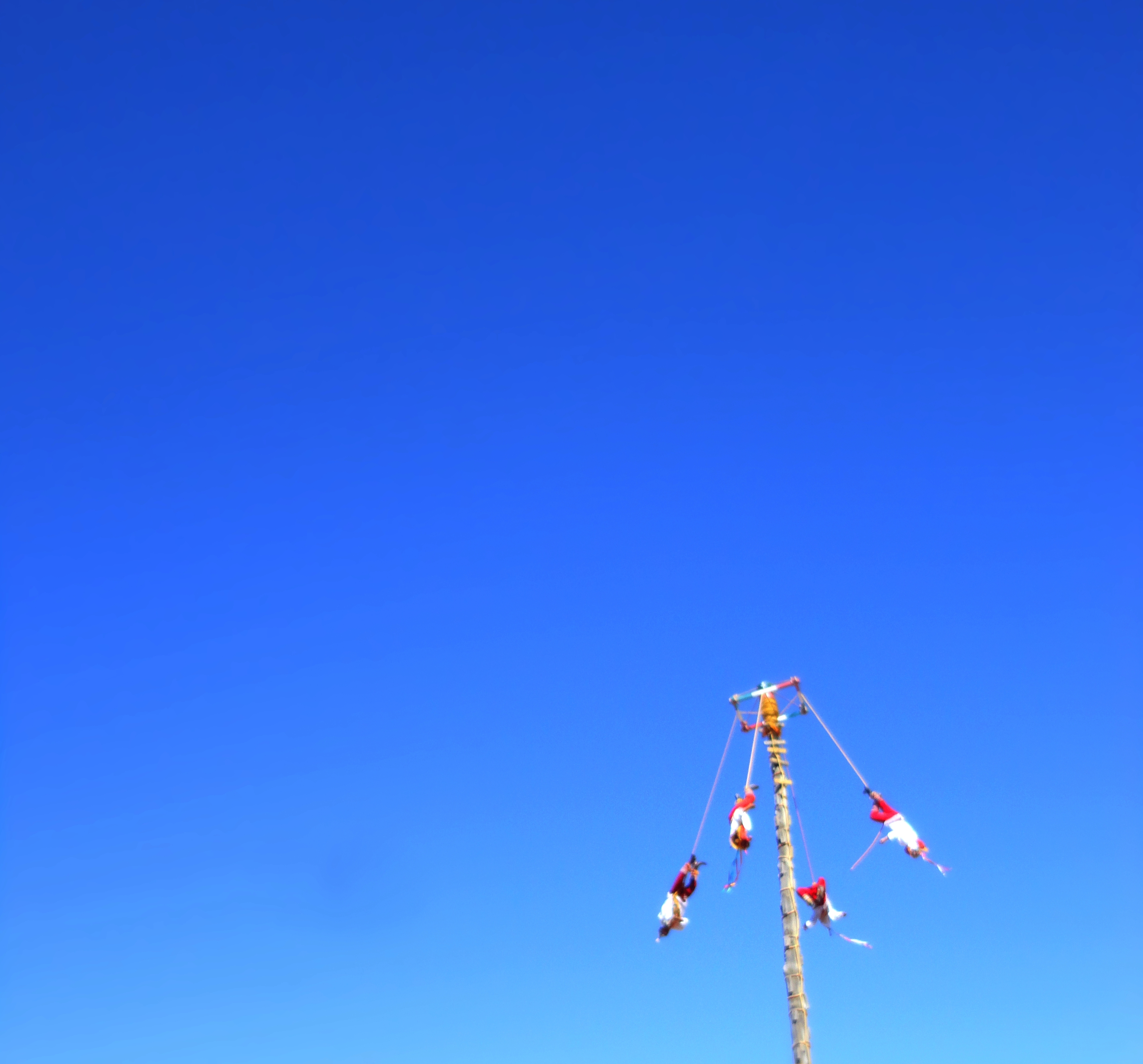
Voladores in Teotihuacan

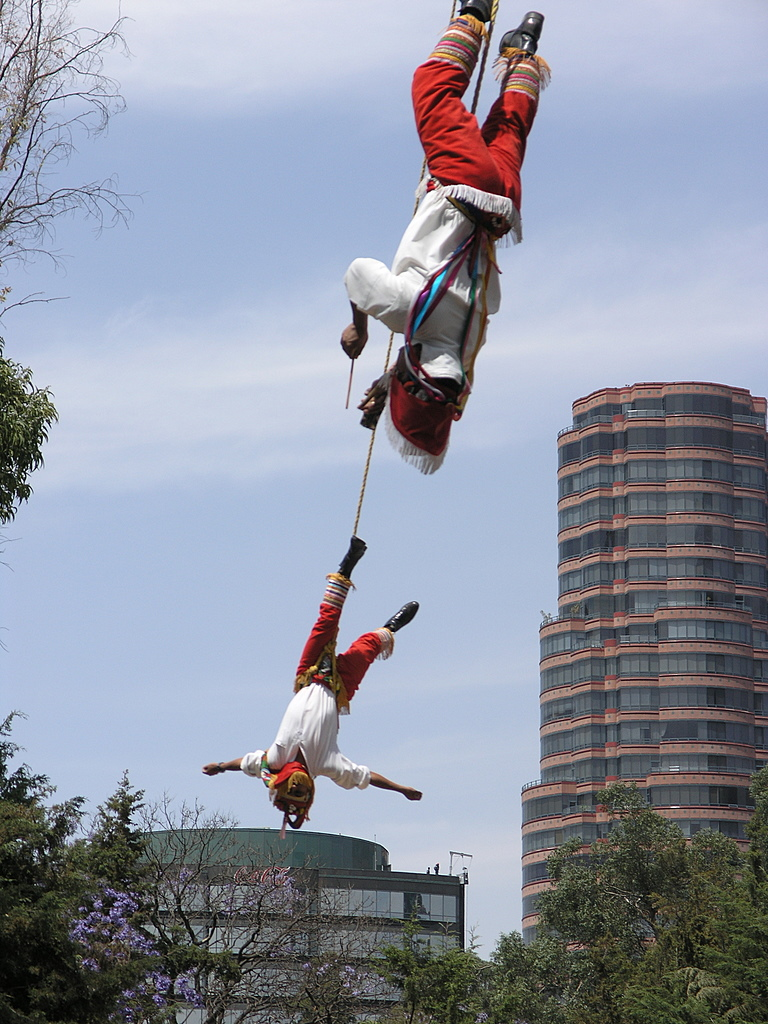
Voladores outside the Museum of Anthropology and History in Polanco, Ciudad de México

The Ritual Ceremony of the Voladores of Papantla was recognized as Intangible cultural heritage (ICH) by UNESCO in 2009. This is the second Mexican event to be so recognized, with the first being the Indigenous Festivity of the Dead in 2008. Governor Fidel Herrera Beltrán received the award in the name of the people and the government of Veracruz, and especially the indigenous people of the Totonacapan region of the state. Celebrations of the recognition took place on October 12, 2009, in Takilhsukut Park at El Tajín and other volador sites in Mexico. The ritual was inscribed along with the Traditions of the Otomi-Chichimecas of Toliman, Peña de Bernal, Querétaro.

The recognition carries the responsibility for Mexico to safeguard and promote the tradition to keep it alive. A part of the nomination process was an extensive regional plan of preservation, promotion and development of the cultural heritage in Veracruz and other parts of Mexico and Central America. One effort that has been underway is the establishment of the Escuela de Niños Voladores (School of Volador Children), which is located at Takilhsukut Park and is the first formal school for voladores. It has a student population of between 70 and 100 students who learn about the history, significance and values associated with the ritual from the pre-Hispanic period. These include those associated with the taking of the pole, called a tsakáe kiwi, from the forest, an aspect of the ritual that is in danger of extinction. The school is sponsored by the Veracruz state government and children begin attending between 6 and 8 years of age. Most come from the neighboring communities of Plan de Hidalgo, El Tajín, San Lorenzo and Arroyos del Arco and Oxital, and whose fathers and grandfathers are voladores. The school requires students to meet certain requirements, such as being able to speak Totonac and girls are not permitted. However, most voladores learn the ritual from their fathers and grandfathers starting at age eight or ten. To become a volador in the traditional Totonac community requires 10 to 12 years of preparation and many consider it to be a life vocation.

Another effort to conserve and promote the tradition is the Encuentro de Voladores (Volador Encounter), which was begun in 2009 and coincides with the Cumbre Tajín spring equinox event of the El Tajín site. For five days, voladores from various places perform at the poles erected at the site. The objective is not only to see the different costumes and styles of the groups but to share experiences about the fertility ritual. Voladores come from as far as San Luis Potosí and Guatemala.

One reason for the need of protection is that in most cases in Mexico, the ritual is not performed for religious purposes. The first organization for voladores came about in the 1970s but also the commercialization of the ritual. There are about 600 professional voladores in Mexico.

In smaller communities, the ritual is enacted only on the feast day of the community's patron saint or other religious events, but in larger communities, especially where there are tourists, it is performed as an attraction for donations. Two examples of this are the voladores that perform in Xcaret and Xel-Ha, and the Totonac voladores in Chapultepec Park in Mexico City, who are one of the parks major attractions. Some groups of voladores try to balance respect for the ritual while still performing for spectators. There is a formal established group in Boca del Río that has been recognized by municipal authorities and receives support in the way of space and a permanent pole.. The goal of the group is to offer to tourists a dignified version of the ritual at the Plaza Bandera that does not forget its roots. Members of the group are all natives of the city of Papantla. The ceremony is held in a public park and youths are required to leave items such as bicycles and skateboards outside the ceremonial space.

To promote the ritual and the culture behind it internationally, groups of voladores have performed in many parts of Mexico and other countries as part of cultural festivals. Voladores have performed at the Zapopum Festival in Guadalajara, the Festival of San Pedro in Monterrey, the Indian Summer Festival in Milwaukee, the Carnaval Cultural in Valparaíso, the Forum Universal de las Culturas in Barcelona, and at an intercultural show in New York.

== In popular culture ==
In episode 6 of the animated series Onyx Equinox, the characters visit the Totonac city of Tajin, where people perform the dance, but can actually grow bird wings and fly.

During the song "Without Question" from the DreamWorks animated film The Road to El Dorado, Miguel takes part in the ritual.

== See also ==
- Joyabaj
- Charak Puja
