= Joyabaj =

Joyabaj Sho' la baj
- Municipality
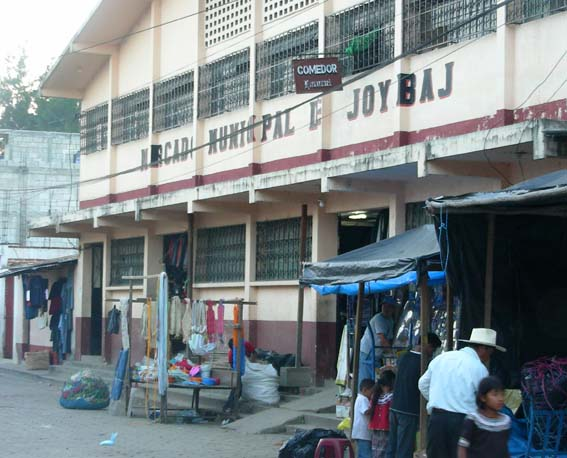
- Municipal Market of Joyabaj

- Location in Guatemala
- Coordinates: 14°59′42″N 90°48′27″W
- Country: Guatemala
- Department: El Quiché
- Municipality: Joyabaj

Government
  - Type: Municipal

Area
  - Municipality: 338 km^{2} (131 sq mi)

Population (Census 2018)
  - Municipality: 82,369
  - Density: 244/km^{2} (631/sq mi)
  - Urban: 15,451
  - Ethnicities: K'iche' Ladino
  - Religions: Roman Catholicism Evangelicalism Maya The Church of Jesus Christ of Latter-day Saints
- Climate: Aw

Joyabaj (Spanish pronunciation: [xoʝaˈβax]) is a town and municipality in the Guatemalan department of El Quiché. It is located about 50 kilometers from Santa Cruz del Quiché, in the Sierra de Chuacús mountains.

Joyabaj was an important part of the royal route to Mexico during the Spanish time. On February 4, 1976, the town was almost destroyed by an earthquake. Most of its beautiful colonial houses and buildings were lost and hundreds of people died. Joyabaj was also hit hard by the civil war that lasted about 30 years in Guatemala. The majority of the ladinos (people with mixed Spanish and Indian heritage) fled to Guatemala City.

The town's fiesta is celebrated from August 8–15. Many activities take place every day. One of the most important and fantastic celebrations is El Palo Volador. This is a traditional dance in which flying angels (ángeles) spin to the ground from a huge wooden pole. The Palo Volador reenacts the descent of the angels into the underworld to battle the forces of darkness. This a pre-conquest ritual that has survived many centuries.

The people from Joyabaj are called Xoyes or Joyabatecos.
