= Sakapultek people =

Sakapultek
Total population
- 12,938

Regions with significant populations

Languages
- Sakapultek, Spanish

Religion
- Catholic, Evangelicalist, Maya religion

Related ethnic groups
- Kʼicheʼ

The Sakapultek are a Maya people in Guatemala, located in the municipality of Sacapulas. The Sakapultek language is closely related to Kʼicheʼ.
