= Sierra de Chuacús =

Highest point
- Elevation: 2,504 m (8,215 ft)

Geography
- Country: Guatemala
- Provinces: El Quiché and Baja Verapaz
- Range coordinates: 15°05′N 90°45′W

The Sierra de Chuacús is situated in the central highlands of Guatemala, and runs southeast from El Quiché to Baja Verapaz. Its northwestern border is marked by the Chixoy River basin in Uspantán, which separates it from the Sierra de los Cuchumatanes. Its eastern border is marked by the Salamá River which separates it from the Sierra de las Minas. Its southeastern border is defined by the Motagua River valley.

The main crest of the Sierra the Chuacús is located along the El Quiché and Baja Verapáz border, and extends at an elevation above 2,100 m for more than 50 km. Its highest peak reaches up to 2504 m.

Located between the Motagua Fault and the Chixoy-Polochic Fault, the Chuacús mountains were formed by complex tectonic and geological processes that started in the Late Cretaceous.

== See also ==
- Geography of Guatemala
- Guatemalan highlands
