= Ladino people =

Mix of peoples mainly in Central America

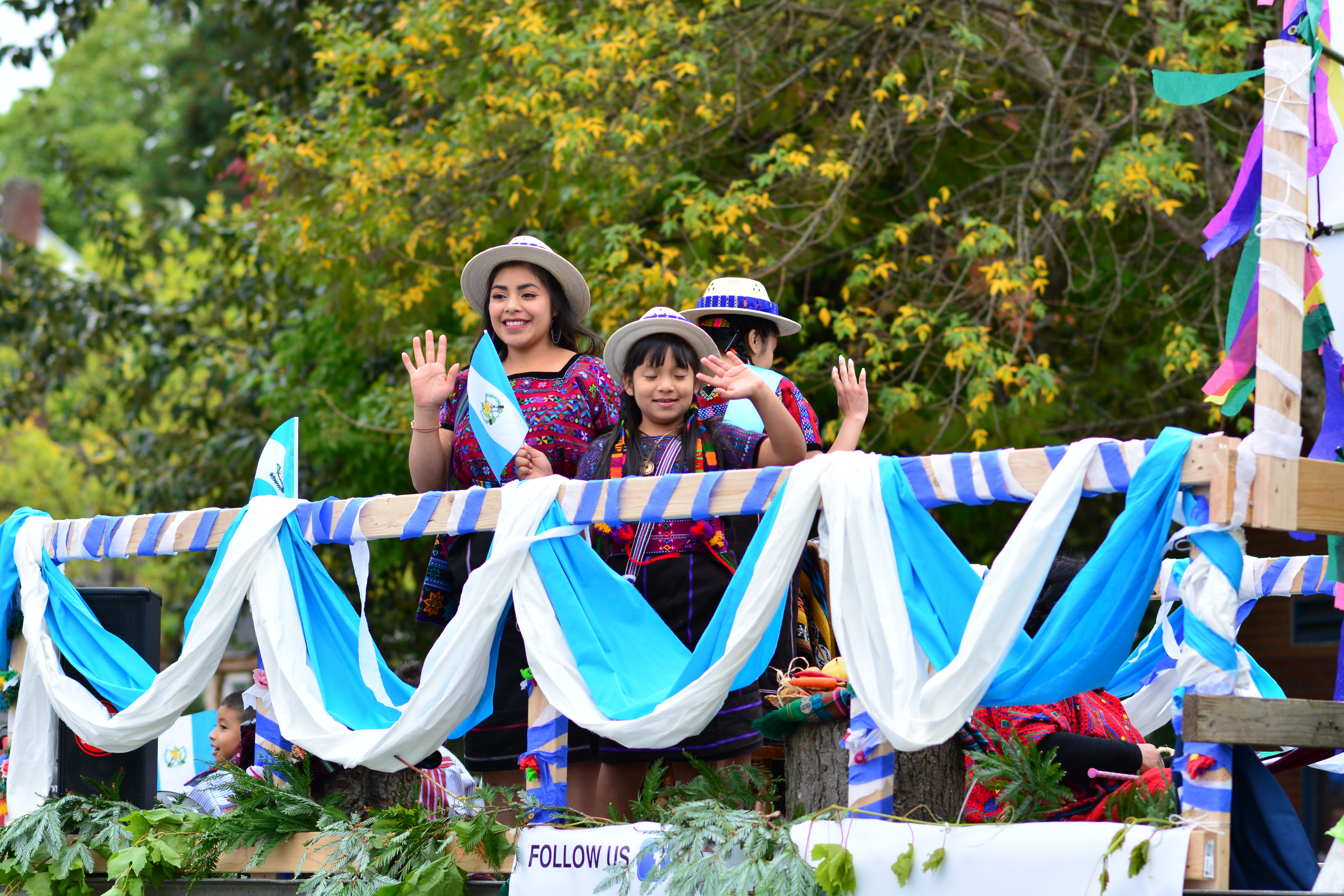
- Ladino Guatemalans at the 2019 Fiestas Patrias Parade in Seattle, USA

Total population
- 8,346,120; 56% of the Guatemalan population (2018)

Regions with significant populations
- Guatemala; El Salvador; Honduras; Mexico

Languages
- Central American Spanish

Religion
- Catholicism, Evangelicalism and Irreligion

Related ethnic groups
- Mestizo; Indigenous people of the Americas; Europeans; Castizo; Spaniards

The Ladino people are a mix of mestizo or Hispanicized peoples in Latin America, principally in Central America. The demonym Ladino is a Spanish word that is related to Latino. Ladino is an exonym initially used during the colonial era to refer to those Spanish-speakers who were not Peninsulares, Criollos or Indigenous peoples.

== Etymology ==
The meaning of the word "Ladino" has changed much over the course of history. It was used in what is now modern day Spain during the early middle ages to refer to the vernacular languages that were spoken there. With the rise of Latin in the 1200s, the term fell out of larger usage, but was still used to refer to the vernacular language of Sephardic Jews, which had no correlation. It still retains archaic usage in the Spanish world as someone fluent in classical and Church Latin, the language of the intellectual elite and thus associated with people who are smart or highly educated.

In the colonial Americas, the usage of the term became even more complicated. It could be used positively to describe non-Spanish populations that knew Spanish, and were seen as more "civilized" than indigenous populations. On the flip side, in colonial Colombia and Mexico, it could be used to refer to a trickster or mean-spirited person, usually of native heritage. Even more confusingly, in Mexico, it could also be used to describe a non-native speaker of Nahuatl, the language of the Aztecs, such as Spanish scribes who learned the language.

In 15th-century Guatemala, the term was used to refer to the second language (Spanish) spoken by non-Spanish populations. However, by the 1700s, its meaning had evolved to describe any group within the casta system that was not Spanish, including mixed-race mestizos and Indigenous peoples.

In the Philippines where Spanish influenced the native languages; the similarly pronounced word, "Matino", means someone who is civilized or well-mannered, it is a cognate of Ladino but it's use is not limited to race or religion, Spanish Filipinos, Mexican Filipinos, Native Filipinos, Asian Filipinos and even non Christian Filipinos like the Muslim, Hindu, and Animist ones from the Precolonial kingdoms, can all be called Matino if they are civilized and have good manners.

== Indio Ladinos ==
"Indio Ladinos" was a term used by the Spanish colonial government to refer to indigenous people who had learned the Spanish language and customs. Some early examples of this include La Malinche, a Nahua translator who assisted Hernan Cortes in his conquering of the Aztec Empire. Their knowledge and mastery of Spanish language and custom allowed them to bridge the gap between the Spanish and indigenous communities. Some Indio Ladinos aided and fought in the Spanish conquest, such as the Nahua and Mixtec people. They were an important part of the colonial regime, and helped to strengthen colonial government, education, and religion. Many helped to teach the catechism, monitored church attendance, and presided over marriages. Notaries in municipal government were often former indigenous noblemen, who were taught Spanish by Franciscan friars. Indio Ladinos also attended and were instructors at newly created colleges and universities, such as the Colegio Imperial de Santa Cruz de Tlatelolco, founded in 1536.

Some Indio Ladinos worked more with indigenous groups. They served as negotiators between the colonial regime and native groups for things like land disputes, such as in the Mexican town of Cuauhtinchan in 1521. Some were also leaders of indigenous religious revival movements, such as the Taki Unquy in Peru in 1565. Indio Ladino mapmakers also helped to preserve traditional indigenous cartography, with a pictographic style and symbols for geographic features.

== Guatemala ==
The Ladino population in Guatemala is officially recognized as a distinct ethnic group. The Ministry of Education of Guatemala uses the following definition:

The ladino population has been characterized as a heterogeneous population which expresses itself in the Spanish language as a maternal language, which possesses specific cultural traits of Hispanic origin mixed with indigenous cultural elements, and dresses in a style commonly considered as western.

The population censuses include the ladino population as one of the different ethnic groups in Guatemala.

In popular use, the term ladino commonly refers to non-indigenous Guatemalans, as well as Mestizos and Westernized Amerindians. The word is actually derived from the old Spanish ladino (inherited from the same Latin root Latinus that the Spanish word Latino was later borrowed from), originally referring to those who spoke Romance languages in medieval times, and later also developing the separate meaning of "crafty" or "astute". In the Central American colonial context, it was first used to refer to those Amerindians who came to speak only Spanish, and later included their mestizo descendants.

Ladino is sometimes used to refer to the mestizo middle class, or to the population of indigenous peoples who have attained some level of upward social mobility above the largely impoverished indigenous masses. This relates especially to achieving some material wealth and adopting an Americanized lifestyle. In many areas of Guatemala, it is used in a wider sense, meaning "any Guatemalan whose primary language is Spanish and culture is not Native American".

Indigenist rhetoric sometimes uses ladino in the second sense, as a derogatory term for indigenous peoples who are seen as having betrayed their homes by becoming part of the middle class. Some may deny indigenous heritage to assimilate. "The 20th century K'iche Maya political activist, Rigoberta Menchú, born in 1959, used the term this way in her noted memoir, which many considered controversial. She illustrates the use of ladino both as a derogatory term, when discussing an indigenous person becoming mestizo/ladino, and in terms of the general mestizo community identifying as ladino as a kind of happiness.

== See also ==
- Assimilado
- Hispanicization
- Ilustrado
- Emancipados
- Évolué
- Ladino (Judaeo-Spanish language)
