= Antelo (surname) =

Antelo is a Galician language surname, relating to the settlement of Antelo, Boa, Noia. Notable people with the surname include:

- Jimena Antelo (born 1972), Bolivian television presenter
- José Ángel Antelo (born 1987), Spanish basketball player and politician
- Marcelo Antelo (born 1988), Argentine serial killer
- Sandra Antelo (born 1968), Bolivian sprinter
- Víctor Hugo Antelo (born 1964), Bolivian footballer and manager
