= Gauchito =

Gauchito may refer to:

- The FIFA World Cup mascot of 1978: a boy wearing Argentina's kit, his hat (with the words ARGENTINA '78), neckerchief and whip are typical of gauchos
- Gauchito Gil, an Argentine folk religious figure
