= Iglesia de Santo Tomás =

Church in Chichicastenango, Guatemala

Coordinates: 14.9419°N 91.1112°W

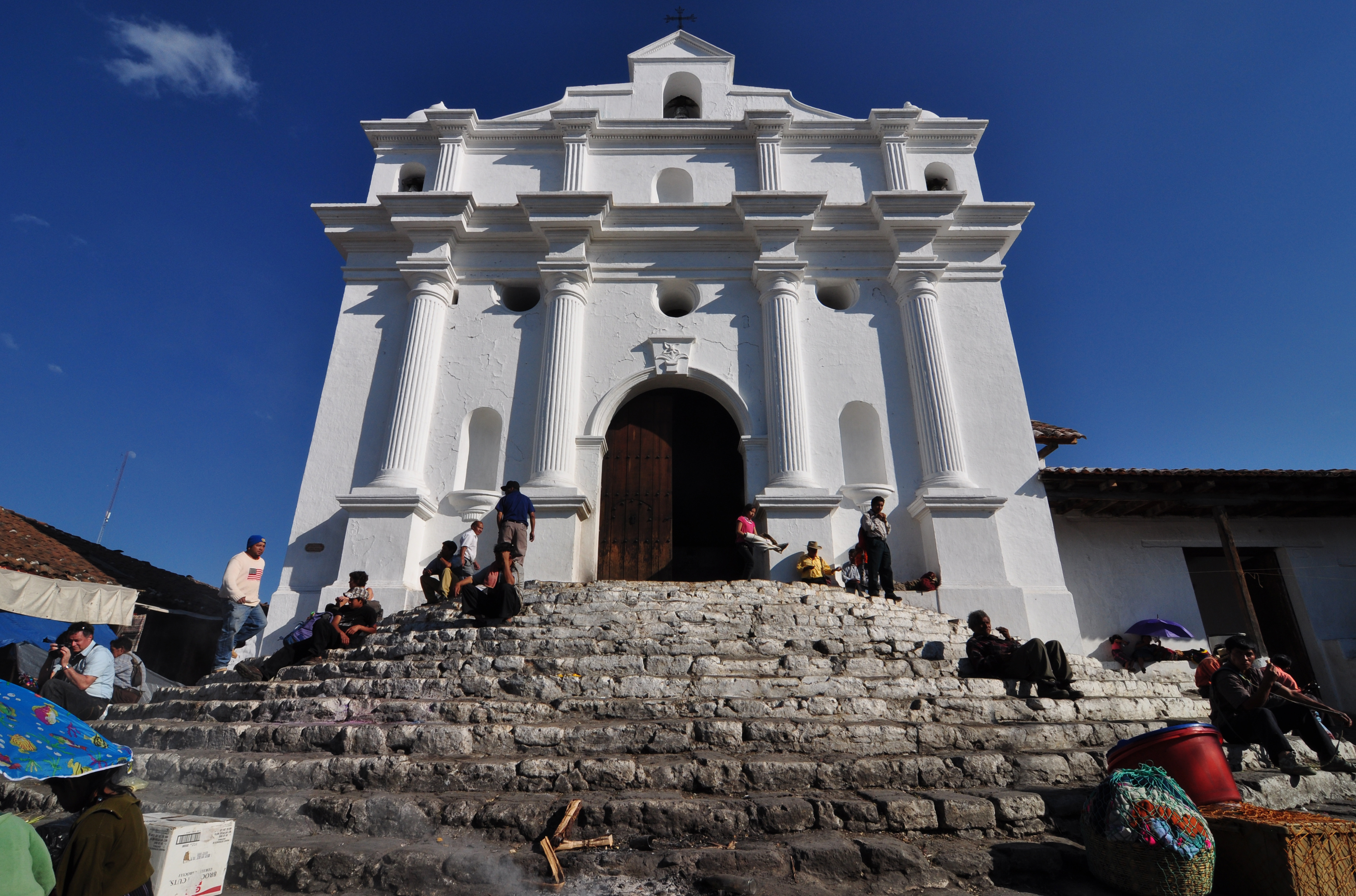
Church as seen in 2009

The Iglesia de Santo Tomás is a Roman Catholic church in Chichicastenango, Guatemala. It is located in the market place of the town which is known for its pottery and contains the Chichicastenango Regional Museum. It was built around 1545 atop a Pre-Columbian temple platform, and the steps originally leading to a temple of the pre-Hispanic Maya civilization remain venerated. K'iche' Maya priests still use the church for their rituals, burning incense and candles. Each of the 18 stairs that lead up to the church stands for one month of the Maya calendar year. Another key element of Chichicastenango is the Cofradia of Pascual Abaj, which is an ancient carved stone venerated nearby and the Maya priests perform several rituals there. Writing on the stone records the doings of a king named Tohil (Fate).
