= San Pascualito =

Latin American Folk Saint associated with graveyards

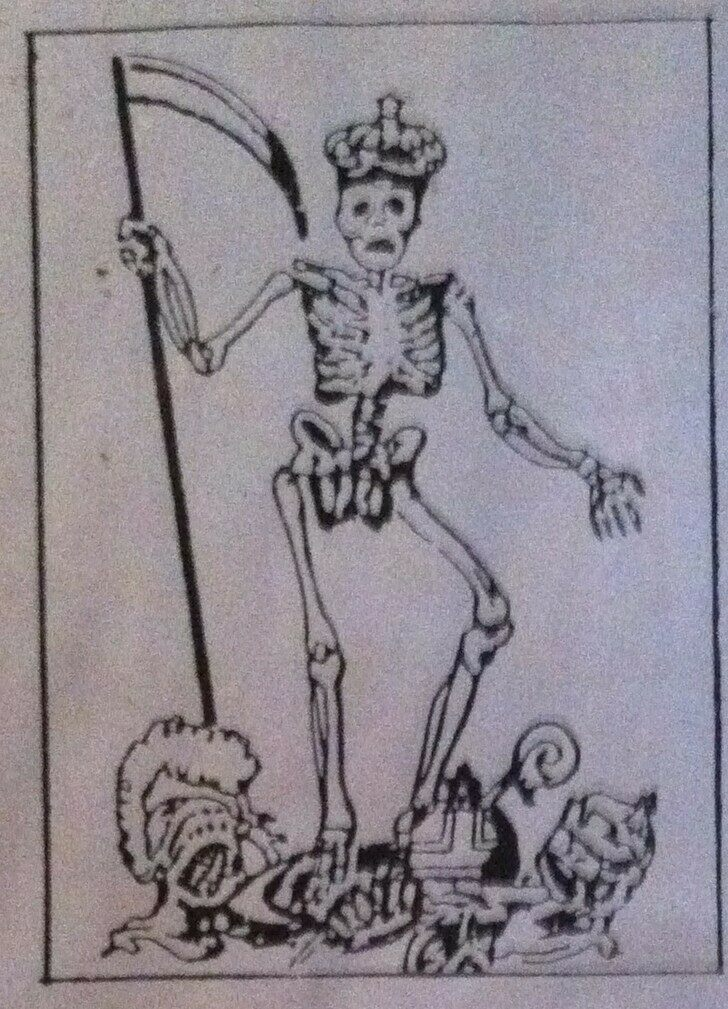
- An image of San Pascualito

King of the Graveyard
- Venerated in: Folk Catholicism
- Major shrine: Olintepeque, Guatemala
- Feast: May 17
- Attributes: Skeletal figure, cape, crown, wheeled cart
- Patronage: Curing diseases, death, healings, cures, vengeance, love, graveyards

San Pascualito (also known as San Pascualito Muerte and El Rey San Pascual) is a folk saint associated with Saint Paschal Baylon and venerated in Guatemala and the Mexican state of Chiapas. He is called "King of the Graveyard." His veneration is associated with the curing of disease, and is related to the Latin American cult of death. The tradition may be related to the worship of a pre-Columbian death god. San Pascualito is represented as a skeleton, sometimes caped or wearing a crown. The veneration of San Pascualito is not approved by the Roman Catholic Church.

== History ==
San Pascualito derived his name from the Spanish friar, Paschal Baylon, who according to historian Francisco Antonio de Fuentes y Guzmán, is said to have appeared in 1650 in a vision of an indigenous Guatemalan man in San Antonio Aguacaliente (modern day Ciudad Vieja). The man was dying from an epidemic fever called cucumatz in Kaqchikel, and had received the last rites before a tall skeleton in glowing robes appeared to him in a vision.

The figure introduced himself as "Saint Paschal Baylon," although Baylon was not canonized until 1690. (He had been beatified in 1618.) He promised to intercede to end cucumatz if he were to be adopted by the community as patron saint and his image venerated. As proof of his identity, the figure predicted that the man receiving the vision would die within nine days, at which time the epidemic would also cease. When the man died within the predicted timeframe and the epidemic ended, word of the vision spread, and images of San Pascualito became popular despite formal prohibition by the Spanish Inquisition.

== Veneration ==
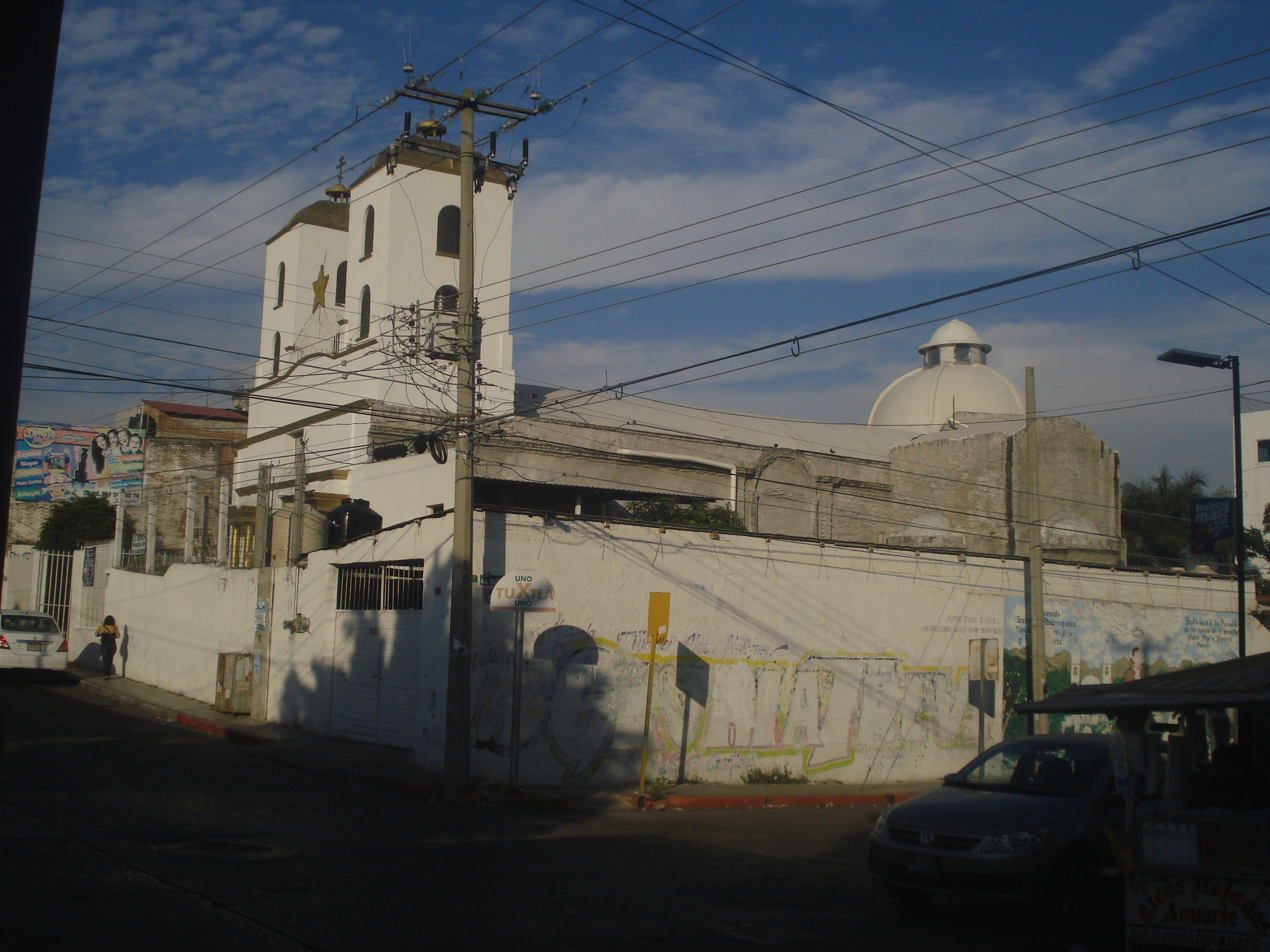
The church in Tuxtla, Chiapas.

A chapel in Olintepeque, Guatemala is dedicated to the veneration of El Rey San Pascual. Devotees leave thank you notes, offer capes or burn candles. The color of the candle burned signifies the nature of the request for intercession: red for love, pink for health, yellow for protection, green for business, blue for work, light blue for money, purple for help against vices, white for the protection of children, and black for revenge. A festival is celebrated annually on May 17, the feast day of Saint Paschal Baylon. Another sacred replica, represented by a seated skeleton in a wheeled cart, is kept in the Church of San Pascualito in Tuxtla Gutiérrez in the Mexican state of Chiapas.

== Literature ==
San Pascualito is represented by a character named Pascal in the novel El tiempo principia en Xibalbá ("Time Commences in Xibalbá") by Guatemalan author Luis de Lión (José Luis de León Díaz).

== See also ==
- Death (personification)
- Maximón
- Pascual Abaj
- San La Muerte
- Santa Muerte
