= Marcelo Antelo =

Argentine serial killer

- Born: Marcelo Alejandro Antelo; 1988 (age 37–38); Buenos Aires, Argentina
- Other names: "The San La Muerte Killer" "Marcelito"
- Conviction: Murder
- Penalty: Life imprisonment

Details
- Victims: 4–7+
- Span of crimes: February – August 2010
- Country: Argentina
- State: Buenos Aires
- Date apprehended: August 30, 2010
- Imprisoned at: Unknown prison in Ezeiza

Marcelo Alejandro Antelo (born 1988), known as The San La Muerte Killer, is an Argentine serial killer, responsible for the murders of at least four people in the Flores neighborhood in Buenos Aires between February and August 2010. Allegedly committing them in the name of the pagan saint San La Muerte, he was sentenced to life imprisonment for his crimes.

== Early life ==
Marcelo Antelo, often referred to as "Marcelito", grew up in an unstable household - his grandmother was an alcoholic, as well as his father Alberto, who also had a drug addiction. His mother frequently beat him, and eventually kicked him out of the house due to the young Antelo also being heavily addicted to coca paste. Abandoned by his parents, he went to live with an uncle he loved dearly, but the man soon died in a mugging, leaving little Antelo alone and helpless.

Between the ages of 17 and 19, he entered several rehabilitation centers for his addiction, but all of them proved unsuccessful. At 20, he was kicked out by pregnant girlfriend Brenda after she got tired of him treating her poorly. Isolated and homeless, Antelo's drug addiction worsened, as he roamed the Rivadavia social housing complex in Flores neighborhood. He eventually ended up joining a church named the "God in Force Church", where he engaged in prayers and cultish activities to end his addiction, but, yet again, he was unsuccessful. As he frequently fought with drug dealers, Antelo ended up losing one of his kidneys during a shooting.

== Crimes ==
=== Attack on Jorge Díaz ===
On February 21, 2010, Antelo shot Jorge Díaz in the legs during an attempted robbery. Díaz survived, and Antelo was convicted of robbery and attempted murder, but was released only a short while later. In his subsequent attacks, he struck at night, when there was low visibility and he could not be seen .

=== Murder of Rodrigo Ezcurra ===
A 27-year-old philosophy student who also studied law and once held a job in a court, Ezcurra was a drug addict who lived with his father Horacio in Palermo. Aspiring to turn his life around after a long trip through Mexico, Ezcurra had begun therapy to treat his addiction two months prior to his murder. But on April 11, 2010, at around 2 o'clock in the morning, he came across "The Kindergarten Boys" in an alleyway, a gang of underage youths led by Antelo. They wanted to rob him of his possessions, and despite giving into their demands, he was shot in the chest by Antelo, dying on the spot. Ezcurra's bike and cellphone were then stolen by the perpetrators, whom, unbeknownst to them, were seen by several witnesses and even recorded by one.

=== Attack on Darío Romero ===
On June 24, Antelo decided to attack Darío Romero, a man who used to live with him. While cruising through the neighborhood, he came across Romero, who was planning to play football in a nearby field. Antelo shouted out his name, and immediately shot him in the hand with a shotgun. Romero survived, and Antelo was arrested and convicted of causing serious injuries. Again, he was released after some time.

=== Murder of Jorge Mansilla and Attack on Mario Quiero ===
On August 8, 2010, Antelo wanted to enact revenge upon Jorge Héctor Mansilla, a former flatmate who had kicked him out because of his drug addiction. Antelo rang the doorbell, and when Mansilla answered, he was swiftly killed.

Only a few hours later, Antelo shot and wounded mechanic Mario Jorge Quiero, after he attempted to collect debt for a failed arrangement concerning a friend's car. Quiero managed to escape, however, with Antelo abandoning the idea of finishing him off.

=== Murders of Pablo Zaniuk and Marcelo Cabrera ===
A few days later, on August 15, Antelo came across two friends, Pablo Zaniuk and Marcelo Cabrera. Using his guns, he shot Zaniuk in the face before killing Cabrera, shooting him a total of nine times in the body.

=== Suspected victims ===
Initially, Antelo was to be prosecuted for a fifth murder, that of a man named Santos Valeroso Vargas, but was not convicted in his case. Additionally, he is suspected of, but never charged with, the killings of hobo Pablo Villa and an unidentified young man known simply as "El Diablo", who were both shot and their bodies subsequently burned. It is possible that Antelo might have committed other killings around the area as well.

== Trial and sentence ==
Near the end of the month, Antelo was captured by police and thrown in prison. His trial started on August 6, 2012, and although only the victims' families were present, some relatives outside had gathered a crowd encouraging a conviction and hurling insults at Antelo even handing out flyers calling him a murderer. Meanwhile, Antelo himself denied any responsibility in the killings, accusing the police of "planting" a 9mm pistol in his house in order to have a scapegoat for the unsolved crimes. He additionally denied believing in a pagan saint. However, the jury wasn't convinced, as there was plenty of evidence contradicting his claims, including ballistic expertise and witness testimonies. The judge, Federico Salvá, sentenced him to life imprisonment, which didn't garner any emotional reaction from Antelo.

== See also ==
- List of serial killers by country
