= Chichicastenango Regional Museum =

Archaeological museum in Guatemala

- Spanish: Museo Regional de Chichicastenango
- Location within Guatemala Location within Central America
- Established: 21 December 1949
- Coordinates: 14°56′32″N 91°06′42″W
- Type: Archaeological museum

The Chichicastenango Regional Museum or Museo Regional is a museum in Chichicastenango, Guatemala. It is located at the Iglesia de Santo Tomás. Some of the artifacts are over 3000 years old. Many of the items in the collection were donated by Idelfonso Rossbach, a German Franciscan priest who served in the town from 1894 to 1944.
