= Olintepeque =

Olintepeque Xepau Xekik'el
- Municipality and town
- Location within Guatemala
- Coordinates: 14°53′N 91°31′W
- Country: Guatemala
- Department: Quetzaltenango

Area
  - Total: 13.2 sq mi (34.2 km^{2})
- Elevation: 7,710 ft (2,350 m)

Population (2018)
  - Total: 35,060
  - Density: 2,660/sq mi (1,030/km^{2})
- Time zone: UTC+6 (Central Time)
- Climate: Cwb

Olintepeque (Spanish pronunciation: [olinteˈpeke]) is a town, with a population of 31,545 (2018 census), and a municipality in the Quetzaltenango department of Guatemala, not far from the city of Quetzaltenango. It is located on the Xekik'el (or Xekikel) River.

Olintepeque is known for being the place where the legendary Kʼicheʼ king Tecún Umán died in single combat with the Spanish conquistador, Pedro de Alvarado on February 20, 1524. The river Xekik'el ("where the blood spread") takes its name from the famous battle.

The inhabitants of Olintepeque speak primarily Spanish and Kʼicheʼ. A chapel is dedicated to St John the Baptist and the folk saint San Pascualito.
