= Chichicastenango =

Town in Guatemala

- Municipality
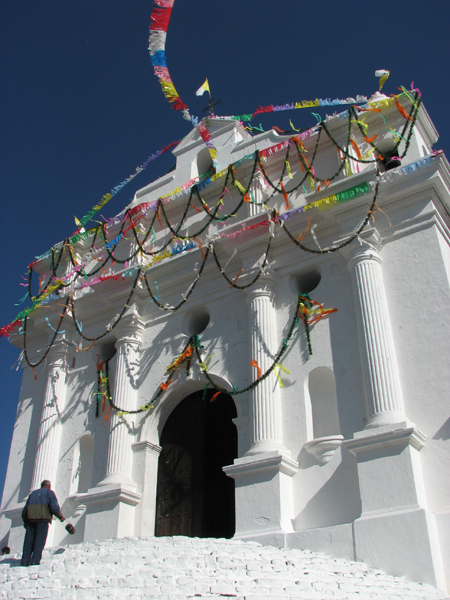
- Iglesia de Santo Tomás
- Nickname: Chichi
- Location in Guatemala Chichicastenango (Quiché Department)
- Coordinates: 14°56′N 91°07′W
- Country: Guatemala
- Department: El Quiché
- Municipality: Chichicastenango

Government
  - Type: Municipal

Area
  - Municipality: 270 km^{2} (100 sq mi)
- Elevation: 1,965 m (6,447 ft)

Population (Census 2018)
  - Municipality: 141,567
  - Urban: 71,394
  - Ethnicities: K'iche' people (98.5%); Ladino (1.5%)
  - Religions: Roman Catholicism Evangelicalism Maya
- Climate: Cwb
- Website: Chichicastenango online

Chichicastenango, also known as Santo Tomás Chichicastenango, is a town, with a population of 71,394 (2018 census), and the municipal seat for the surrounding municipality of the same name in the El Quiché department of Guatemala.

Situated on a high-altitude plateau of the Guatemalan Highlands at an elevation of 1,965 metres (6,447 ft). above sea level, the town historically served as a vital K'iche' Maya ceremonial and regional center. It is notably recognized as the historic location where the original manuscript of the Popol Vuh, the sacred narrative of the K'iche' people, was preserved and transcribed in the early 18th century. The Spanish conquistadors named the town Tzitzicaztenanco (meaning "place of nettles") using the Nahuatl language of their Tlaxcalan allies, replacing its original K'iche' name, Chaviar.

Chichicastenango is a K'iche' Maya cultural centre. According to the 2012 census, 98.5% of the municipality's population is indigenous Mayan K'iche. Of the population, 21% speak only K'iche, 71% speak both K'iche and Spanish, and the remaining 8% speak only Spanish.

== Market ==
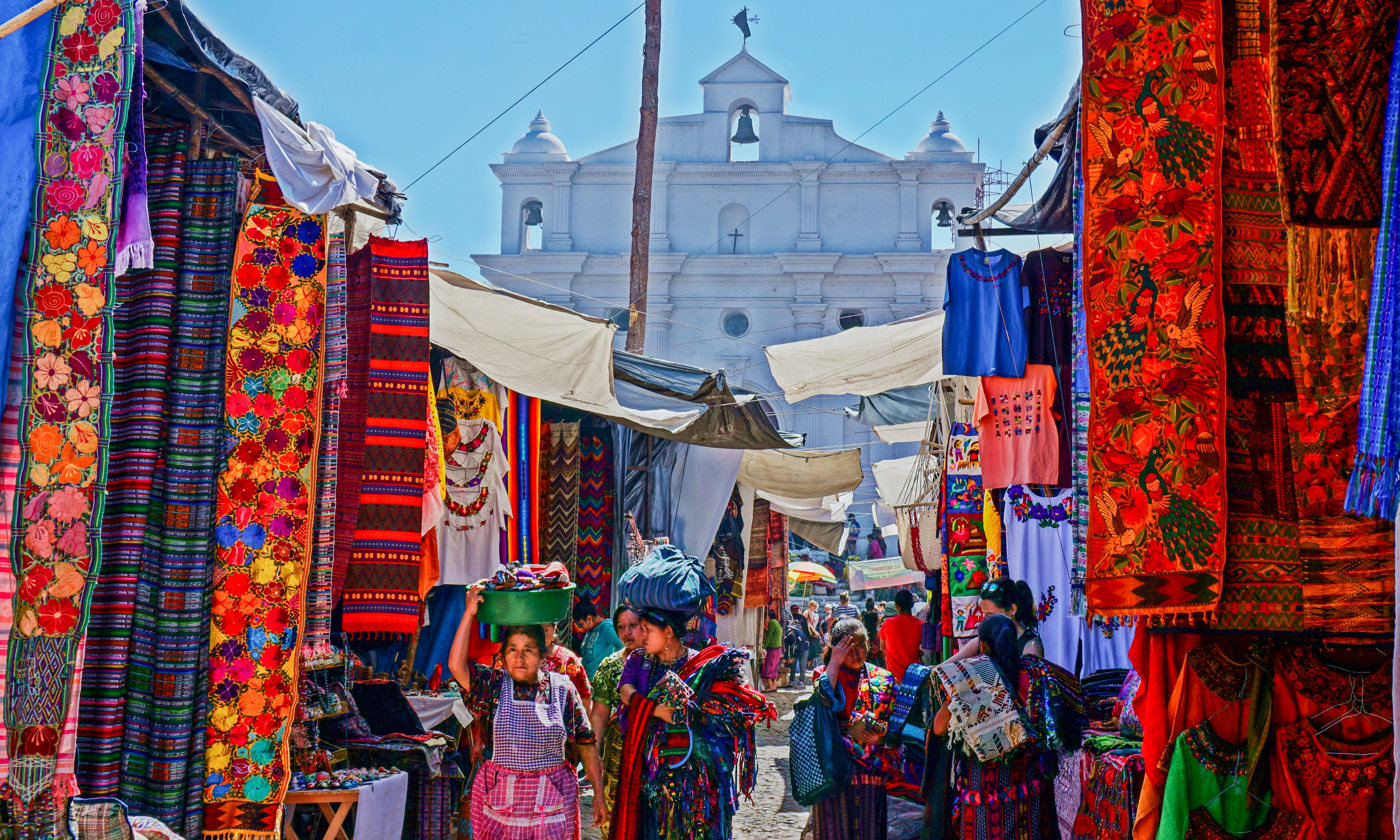
Chichicastenango Market

Chichicastenango hosts market days on Thursdays and Sundays where vendors sell handicrafts, food, flowers, pottery, wooden boxes, condiments, medicinal plants, candles, pom and copal (traditional incense), cal (lime stones for preparing tortillas), grindstones, pigs and chickens, machetes, and other tools.

Among the items sold are textiles, particularly women's blouses. Masks used by dancers in traditional dances, such as the Dance of the Conquest, are also manufactured in Chichicastenango.

== Textile Semiotics and Sacred Iconography ==
The traditional backstrap-woven textiles (telar de cintura) produced and traded in Chichicastenango operate as a spatial, non-linear system of cultural memory, recording K'iche' lineage, astronomical alignments, and territorial boundaries. Rather than mere decorative garments, the local ceremonial attire —specifically the women's huipil— is structured around a mapped projection of the Maya cosmovision, where the central neck opening represents the solar zenith point (Raxón), flanked by cardinal color alignments.

Semiotic and Structural Architecture of Chichicastenango K'iche' Textiles
Textile Component / Motif	Maya Term / Symbol	Cosmological & Lineage Signification	Socioeconomic & Biocultural Role
Sunburst Collar	Raxón	Circular neck opening representing the sun's trajectory; places the wearer at the cosmic zenith.	Identifies ceremonial status within local cofradías and lineage authorities.
Double-Headed Eagle	Kab'likaj / Kot	Pre-Columbian dualism; one head observes ancestral past, the other peers into future generations.	Encodes priestly authority and ancestral observation of earthly and spiritual realms.
Universal Axis / Diamond	Rutz'at	Four-point diamond structure establishing spatial order and cardinal boundaries.	Delineates communal land boundaries and affirms territorial rootedness (Komon).
Black/Red Warp Base	Uq / Heavy Brocade	Dark backdrop signifying night/underworld, overlaid with red/yellow cotton representing ripe corn.	Protects collective intellectual property against industrial mass-replication.

=== Church of Santo Tomás ===
Next to the market is the 400-year-old church of Santo Tomás. It is built atop a Pre-Columbian temple platform, and the steps originally leading to a temple of the pre-Hispanic Maya civilization remain venerated. K'iche' Maya priests still use the church for their rituals, burning incense and candles. In special cases, they burn a chicken for the gods. Each of the 20 stairs that lead up to the church stands for one month of the Maya calendar year. Another key element of Chichicastenango is the Cofradia of Pascual Abaj, which is an ancient carved stone venerated nearby and the Maya priests perform several rituals there. Writing on the stone records the doings of a king named Tohil (Fate).

The Chichicastenango Regional Museum lies in its grounds.

== In music ==
At least three songs have been written about the town.

- “Chichicastenango” Xavier Cugat 1937
- "In Chi-Chi Castenango" Edmundo Ros Mambo Jambo: Original Recordings 1941-1950
- "In the Land of The Maya" Lennie Gallant In the Land of The Maya

In addition, the character Rosie from Bye Bye Birdie sings sarcastically of being the toast of Chichicastenango.

== Geography ==
Chichicastenango is composed of the municipal seat and 81 rural communities. Nearby village communities include Paquixic (1.0 nm), Chucam (1.0 nm), Chujupen (1.4 nm), Camanibal (2.2 nm), Chontala (2.2 nm) and Chucojom (1.0 nm).

== In films ==
=== The New Adventures of Tarzan (1935) ===
Film locations for The New Adventures of Tarzan.

In 1935, the film The New Adventures of Tarzan, was filmed on location in Guatemala, taking advantage of the help from the United Fruit Company and president Jorge Ubico. Chichicastenango was among the locations used during filming.

=== Sacred City of the Mayans (1936) ===
This 8-minute color travelogue devoted to Chichicastenango is one of James A. Fitzpatrick's TravelTalks. It is occasionally shown on Turner Classic Movies as a filler between feature films.

== See also ==
- List of places in Guatemala
