= Mercedes, Corrientes =

Mercedes Merséde (Guarani)
- City

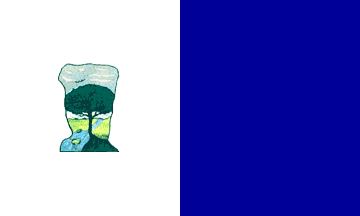
- Flag

- Location of Mercedes in Argentina
- Coordinates: 29°12′S 58°05′W
- Country: Argentina
- Province: Corrientes
- Department: Mercedes
- Established: 19 August 1829

Government
  - Intendant: Víctor Manuel Cemborain

Population (2010 census)
  - Total: 33,551
- Demonym: mercedeño
- Time zone: UTC−3 (ART)
- CPA base: W3470
- Dialing code: +54 3773

Mercedes (Spanish pronunciation: [meɾˈseðes]; Guarani: Merséde) is a city in the center of the province of Corrientes, Argentina. It is a first-class municipality with a population of 40,667 at the 2010 census [INDEC], and the head town of the department of the same name, which also includes the towns of Felipe Yofre and Mariano I. Loza. It is 275 km from the provincial capital, Corrientes, and 739 km from Buenos Aires.

The town, founded in 1829, is served by several grade schools, including Escuela Normal Manuel Florencio Mantilla, Colegio San Carlos, Escuela Agrotécnica Eulogio Cruz Cabral, Escuela Comercial Nocturna Ejército Argentino, and Instituto Popular de Mercedes Manuel López Rodríguez.

== Geography ==
Mercedes is located in the center of Corrientes province, Argentina, and serves as the head town of the Mercedes Department. It lies approximately 275 km from the provincial capital, Corrientes, and 739 km from Buenos Aires. The city's geographical coordinates are 29°10′S latitude and 58°04′W longitude, situating it in a region characterized by its flat to gently undulating terrain.

== Economy ==
Mercedes is in the middle of an important livestock-raising area and hosts large livestock exhibitions and fairs. It has a Historical and Fine Arts Museum, as well as a Natural History Museum with more than 1,000 animal samples. There is a sanctuary in memory of the Gauchito Gil, a popular religious and folkloric figure, 10 km from the city.

The city is renowned within the province as the prime livestock-producing department and, on a national level, for hosting the second largest Rural Exhibition after Palermo's in Buenos Aires. Additionally, a significant portion of its land is dedicated to rice production, with rice mills of notable importance both nationally and internationally. The distance to the provincial capital is 244 kilometers.

== Urban Layout ==
The city of Mercedes itself is organized with a central plaza, around which the main civic and commercial buildings are located. This typical colonial layout includes the Church of Our Lady of Mercy, various schools, and municipal buildings, contributing to the city's cultural and historical identity.

== Toponymy ==
Mercedes took its name in 1835 when it was placed under the patronage of Our Lady of Mercy (Nuestra Señora de las Mercedes). The area was previously known as Paiubre. Mercedes is still affectionately called "Paiubre," the only name it had until 1835. The name Paiubre means "the one who eats the most from the entrails," which, when applied to the Corrientes River, can be interpreted as "the one that feeds the most from its own waters." This name originated because, during their last stand, the indigenous Caracarás Guaraníes, the area's early inhabitants, gathered in Rincón de Aguaí, a place watered by the watercourse they called Paiubre, one of the many branches of the vast Corrientes River.

== History ==
In 1825, a group of neighbors sought authorization to establish a town beside the Paiubre stream. This request was unsuccessful, but they persisted in 1829, and on August 19, the provincial government ordered the selection of the location for the new town.

The lands (100 ha.) where Mercedes was founded were donated by José María Gómez. The town was named Mercedes with the blessing of its church on July 23, 1835, adopting Our Lady of Mercy (Nuestra Señora de las Mercedes) as its patroness. The location of the current city was previously known as Paiubre.

The official creation of the city dates back to 1832 by the decision of Governor Pedro Ferré. Initially named after the region, Ferré ordered the construction of its chapel. Although 1832 is recognized as the founding year of Mercedes, no decree specifies the exact date. Therefore, the city's anniversary is celebrated on July 5, in memory of the land donor, José María Gómez. Upon accepting Our Lady of Mercy as the patroness of the burgeoning settlement, Gómez brought the image of the Virgin, and on July 5, 1832, it was solemnly proclaimed and enshrined in the Paiubre Chapel.

In 1835, Governor Atienza renamed the city Mercedes. In 1864, it was designated a village, and in 1888, it was elevated to city status.

== Tourism ==
Mercedes, Corrientes, is surrounded by an array of tourist attractions that showcase the region's natural beauty and cultural heritage. The Tower of Guayabí is a landmark with a stone structure, basalt core, wooden elements, and an extensive collection of books. Another notable site is La Piedra Ita Pucú, a large stone formation steeped in local legends and folklore, providing visitors a glimpse into the geological and cultural history of the area. Additionally, Mercedes is located near the renowned Iberá Wetlands, one of Argentina's ecological reserves. This natural freshwater reservoir is perfect for wildlife enthusiasts and nature lovers, as it includes guided tours, wildlife safaris, and boat trips to observe diverse species in their natural habitats. the Ibera Wetlands houses many species which includes capybaras, caimans and marsh deers. Close to the Iberá Wetlands is Rincón del Socorro, a former cattle ranch turned nature reserve dedicated to the protection and restoration of the Iberá ecosystem.

== Climate ==
 Mercedes has a subtropical climate without a dry season. On 29 July 2021, the lowest historical temperature of −2 degrees Celsius (28.4 °F) was recorded.

Climate data for Mercedes, Corrientes
| Month | Jan | Feb | Mar | Apr | May | Jun | Jul | Aug | Sep | Oct | Nov | Dec | Year |
|---|---|---|---|---|---|---|---|---|---|---|---|---|---|
| Mean daily maximum °C (°F) | 32.1 (89.8) | 31.2 (88.2) | 29.0 (84.2) | 25.4 (77.7) | 22.7 (72.9) | 19.5 (67.1) | 19.6 (67.3) | 20.8 (69.4) | 22.6 (72.7) | 25.1 (77.2) | 28.0 (82.4) | 31.2 (88.2) | 25.6 (78.1) |
| Daily mean °C (°F) | 26.2 (79.2) | 25.3 (77.5) | 23.2 (73.8) | 19.4 (66.9) | 16.9 (62.4) | 13.8 (56.8) | 13.6 (56.5) | 14.8 (58.6) | 16.6 (61.9) | 19.5 (67.1) | 22.3 (72.1) | 24.9 (76.8) | 19.7 (67.5) |
| Mean daily minimum °C (°F) | 20.1 (68.2) | 19.7 (67.5) | 17.9 (64.2) | 14.2 (57.6) | 11.8 (53.2) | 9.2 (48.6) | 8.8 (47.8) | 9.4 (48.9) | 11.2 (52.2) | 14.0 (57.2) | 16.3 (61.3) | 18.6 (65.5) | 14.3 (57.7) |
| Average precipitation mm (inches) | 131.5 (5.18) | 145.5 (5.73) | 166.5 (6.56) | 165.6 (6.52) | 91.7 (3.61) | 73.6 (2.90) | 53.9 (2.12) | 54.0 (2.13) | 86.7 (3.41) | 151.8 (5.98) | 138.3 (5.44) | 137.0 (5.39) | 1,396.1 (54.96) |
| Average relative humidity (%) | 66 | 68 | 73 | 76 | 80 | 82 | 78 | 74 | 74 | 73 | 67 | 63 | 72.8 |
| Mean monthly sunshine hours | 274.1 | 239.3 | 231.4 | 223.7 | 194.7 | 164.8 | 179.5 | 197.8 | 213.2 | 241.9 | 276.1 | 288.8 | 2,725.3 |
Source: Instituto Nacional de Tecnología Agropecuaria

== Sports ==
The city is home to the professional basketball team Club Comunicaciones (Mercedes), which plays its home games at the Estadio Cubierto Club Comunicaciones.
