= San La Muerte =

Folk saint and personification of Death in South America

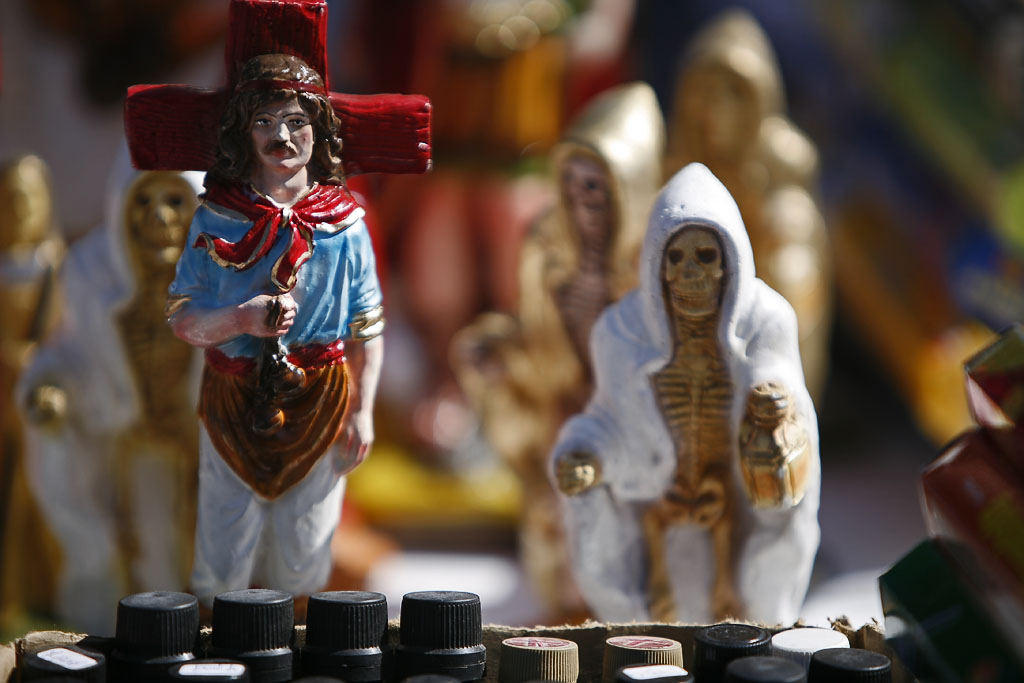
- Figures of Gauchito Gil (left) San La Muerte (right) two popular Saints on display in Argentina.

Saint Skeleton, Saint Death, Lord of the Good Death, Lord of Death
- Venerated in: Folk Catholicism, Argentina, Paraguay, Brazil
- Feast: August 13, August 15
- Attributes: Male skeleton clad in a hooded robe, scythe
- Patronage: Restore love, good fortune, gambling, protection against witchcraft, protection against imprisonment, inmates, prisoners, luck, good health, vengeance

San La Muerte (Saint Death) is a skeletal folk saint that is venerated in Paraguay, Argentina (mainly in the province of Corrientes but also in Misiones, Chaco and Formosa) and southern Brazil (specifically in the states of Paraná, Santa Catarina and Rio Grande do Sul). As a result of internal migration in Argentina since the 1960s, the veneration of San La Muerte has spread to Greater Buenos Aires and to the national prison system as well.

Saint Death is depicted as a male skeleton figure, usually holding a scythe. Although the Catholic Church has rebuked the devotion of Saint Death as a tradition that mixes paganism with Christianity and is contrary to the belief of Resurrection of Jesus defeating death, many devotees view the veneration of San La Muerte as part of their Catholic faith.

Although the rituals connected to and powers ascribed to San La Muerte are very similar, San La Muerte should not be confused with the similar folk saint Santa Muerte that is venerated in Mexico and parts of the US, and is depicted as a female skeleton figure.

== Origins ==
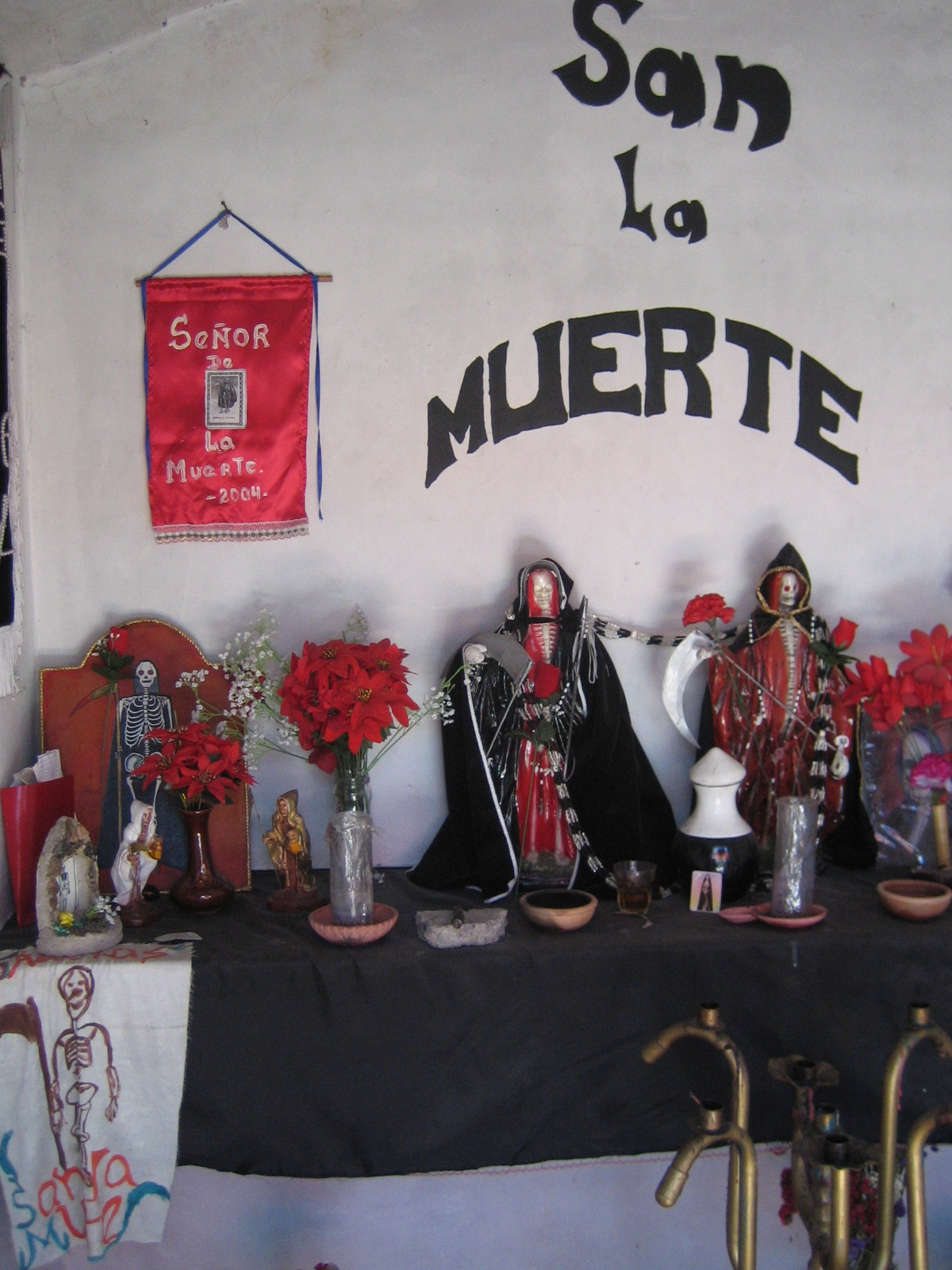
Argentine altar to San La Muerte.

San La Muerte is one of many folk saints venerated in the Guaraní language region that covers parts of Paraguay, north-eastern Argentina and southern Brazil. Others include San Biquicho, San Alejo and Santa Catalina. Other names for San La Muerte include Señor De La Muerte (Lord of Death), Señor De La Buena Muerte (Lord of the Good Death) or – mainly in Paraguay – San Esqueleto (Saint Skeleton). It is believed that San La Muerte was first venerated among the Guaraní Indians following the expulsion of their Jesuit missionaries in 1767, as a mixture of their previous beliefs and the newly imported Catholic faith. One important influence was the payé healers who often fasted, giving themselves thin, skeletal appearances. Some of the Guarani tribes worshiped the bones of ancestors demanding protection against natural phenomena and adverse spiritual forces, which converged with the Catholic tradition of considering the bones of saints as holy relics. Additionally, there were a variety of personifications and Gods of death in the Incan Empire, including Supay, the god of the underworld which may have influenced the idea of a death saint. However, there is currently no authoritative account of the origins of the San La Muerte cult.

== Practice ==
To believers, San La Muerte exists within the context of the Catholic faith and is comparable to other purely supernatural beings such as archangels. The San La Muerte devotion involves prayers, rituals, and offerings, which are given directly to the saint in expectation of and tailored to the fulfillment of specific requests. Offerings can include devotees' own blood, alcoholic drinks, candles and other valuable objects. San La Muerte receives offerings in exchange for favors related to a wide range of personal problems; San La Muerte is said to help to restore love, health and fortune, to protect worshipers from witchcraft, to remove the evil eye and to grant good luck in gambling. In addition to these powers, which are commonly attributed to folk saints in general, San La Muerte is also said to be able to grant a number of requests that are connected to crime and violence. For instance, it is believed that the skeletal saint can bring death upon the enemies of his devotees, can keep people from being sent to prison and shorten prison terms of inmates and can help in the recovery of stolen and misappropriated items. Another Argentine folk saint, Gauchito Gil, who was an outlaw, was a known devotee of San La Muerte.

The San La Muerte devotees have numerous obligation towards the saint, which they must honor in exchange for his protection. While followers request favors from other saints they demand them from San La Muerte. Communication with San La Muerte takes place through prayers that are passed on between believers. The San La Muerte devotion is based on punishment and submission. To be favored by the saint, one sometimes even has to be threatened. Common threats involve hunger or banishment to an uninhabited place until the favor is granted. When graces are granted, the saint will be rewarded and fed but never fully, in order to increase the chances of him soon being willing to grant another grace.

For most devotees San La Muerte offers personal and non-transferable protection that will only be accessible to others when – after the death of the original owner – he or she has acquired the sculpture. There are also intermediaries such as brujos and traditional healers (curanderos) who invoke San La Muerte's power on behalf of their clients, usually concealing the image from sight of their customers. In other cases San La Muerte is kept as a concealed household saint, extending his protection upon all family members with no distinction. A number of public altars that are devoted to San La Muerte can also be found. They are run by devotees acting as guardians of and caretakers for these altars. Some of these altars host public festivities on 15 August as San La Muerte's saint's day. (Since the Catholic Church evidently has assigned no day for veneration of a saint it does not recognize, the date is somewhat contested and in some cases his day is celebrated on 13 August.) The feast day of San La Muerte (15 August) falls on the feast day of the similar folk saint Santa Muerte, though her feast day can be celebrated on 1 November.

== Iconography ==
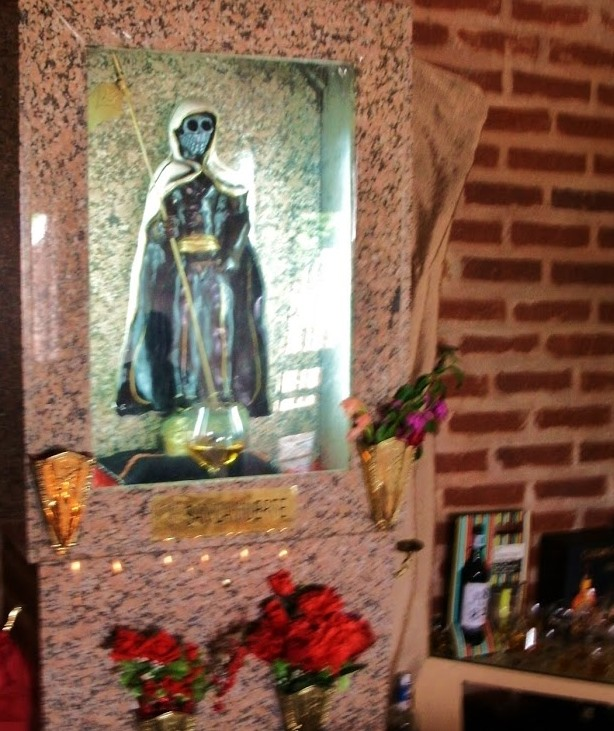
Statue of San La Muerte in central Argentina with alcohol offerings in the background.

The San La Muerte devotion is based on interactions between worshipers and the Saint Death represented by sculptures. Individual sculptures are addressed as San La Muerte (Because of the small size, such a statuette may be colloquially referred to as Santito, or 'Small Saint'.) The representation of San La Muerte varies according to the individual sculptor that has crafted him, however, the classic image is a human skeleton, standing, with simple, minimalistic features. The skeleton usually carries a scythe, in some cases with drops of blood on the edge. The same image can be dressed mostly in black and red cloths. Other representations include standing skeletons without a scythe, sitting skeletons and skeletons in a coffin.

San La Muerte sculptures can be carved from wood, bones, metal (especially bullets) and usually stand between 3 and 15 centimeters tall. Increased powers are attributed to sculptures which are crafted from materials of significant origin, such as the last phalanx bone of the little finger, a bone from a dead baby, wood taken from a dead person's coffin, or a crucifix that belonged to someone recently deceased. Other more common raw materials include guaiac tree and cedar wood.

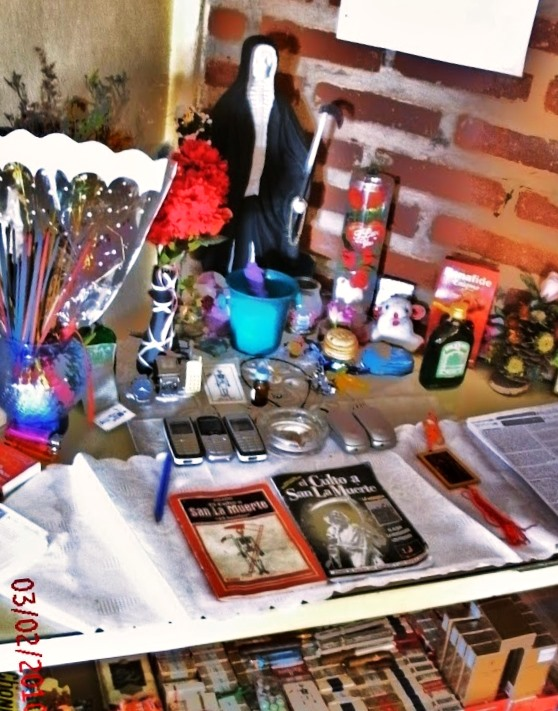
Cigarette and cell phone offerings to San La Muerte in central Argentina.

According to believers, a San La Muerte sculpture, in order to be able to grant favors, needs to be consecrated by a Catholic priest seven times. If the sculpture is carved out of the bone of a Catholic man it only needs to be consecrated five times (as the bone has already been consecrated twice). To get sculptures of San La Muerte blessed, worshipers resort to subterfuge by concealing a picture of San La Muerte underneath a picture of a conventional saint. When a priest blesses the regular saint picture, it is felt that San La Muerte underneath has also been blessed.

Aside from sculptures that are usually kept on an altar or at a fixed place in the house there are a range of personal forms of the ritual that entail representations of San La Muerte being worn on (in the form of amulets and tattoos) or in the body (in the form of carvings inserted under the skin of the worshiper). San La muerte tattoos, amulets and body insertions are believed to offer special protection from death, bodily harm and imprisonment. Among devotees, fired bullets, preferably those that have wounded or killed a Christian man, are regarded as the most powerful raw material for amulets. Other materials for amulets include (human) bone, silver and gold. Tattoos of San La Muerte exhibit a wide variety of styles. From rudimentary outlines to elaborate depictions of three dimensional figures. Images of San La Muerte are usually accompanied by partial or complete transcriptions of prayers to him.

== Controversy ==
Though San La Muerte is largely worshipped as a Catholic saint, he is not officially recognized by the church. Canon saints are almost always verifiable, historical figures who have been canonized by the Vatican. San La Muerte and his worshippers have been directly rebuked by the church on several occasions. In Argentina, certain dioceses have excommunicated followers of the saint. However, the backlash against San La Muerte has not been as extreme as the backlash against his feminine counterpart, Santa Muerte.

== See also ==
- Death (personification)
- Death deity
- San Pascualito
- Santa Muerte
