= Pascual Abaj =

Maya idol in Chichicastenango, Guatemala

- Turcaj / Turk'aj / Turuk'aj / Turukaj
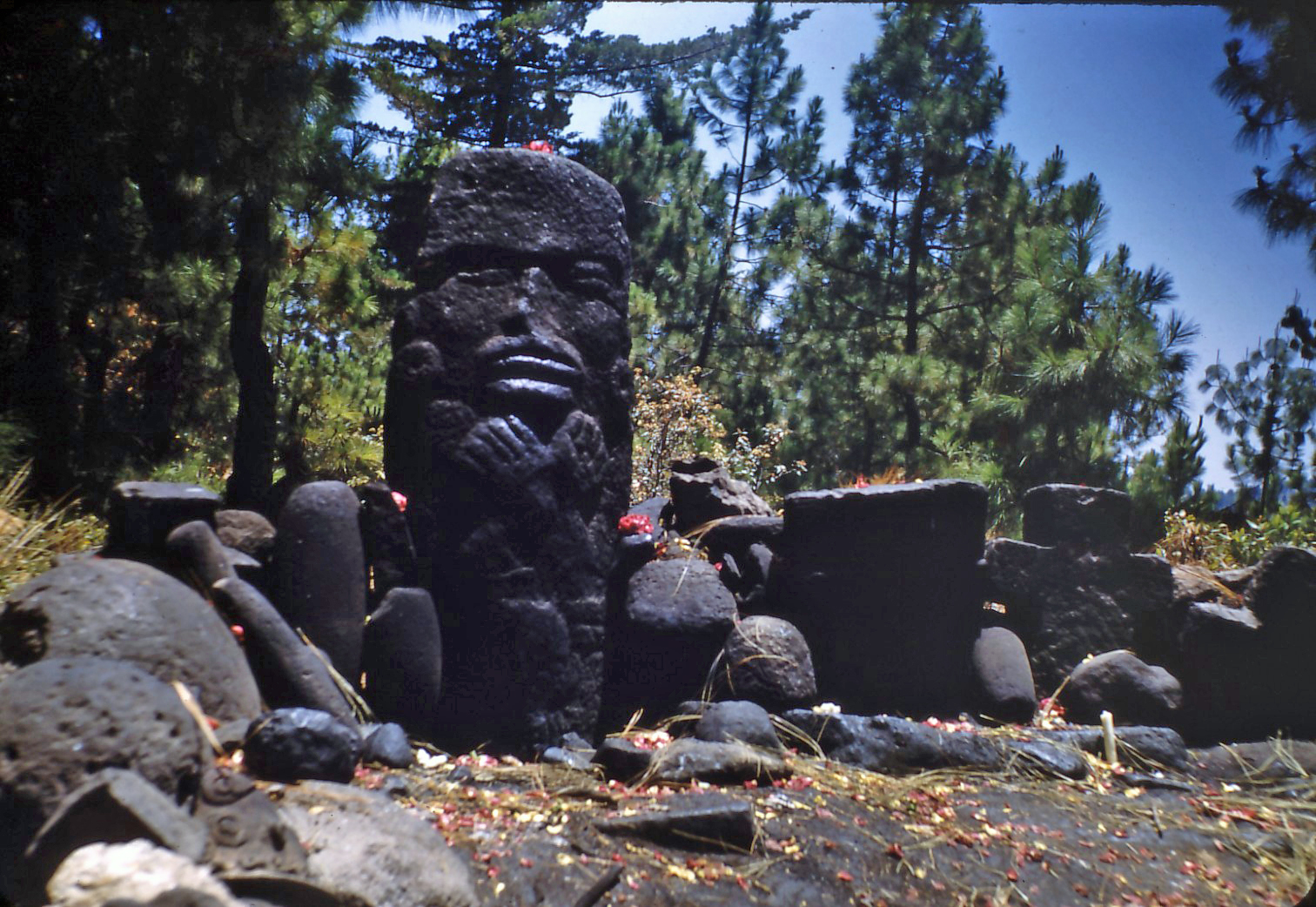
- The statue in 1948, before it was defaced

- Location in Guatemala

Religion
- Affiliation: Maya religion
- District: Quiché Department
- Region: Guatemalan Highlands
- Deity: Rey Pascual

Location
- Municipality: Chichicastenango
- Country: Guatemala
- Interactive map of Pascual Abaj
- Coordinates: 14.936858°N 91.114675°W

Pascual Abaj (alternatively written Pascual Ab'aj), also known as Turcaj, Turk'aj, Turuk'aj and Turukaj, is a pre-Columbian Maya idol at Chichicastenango that survived the Spanish conquest of Guatemala and which is still venerated by the local community. It is the best-known example of such an image. The image was badly damaged in the 1950s by members of Catholic Action.

== History ==
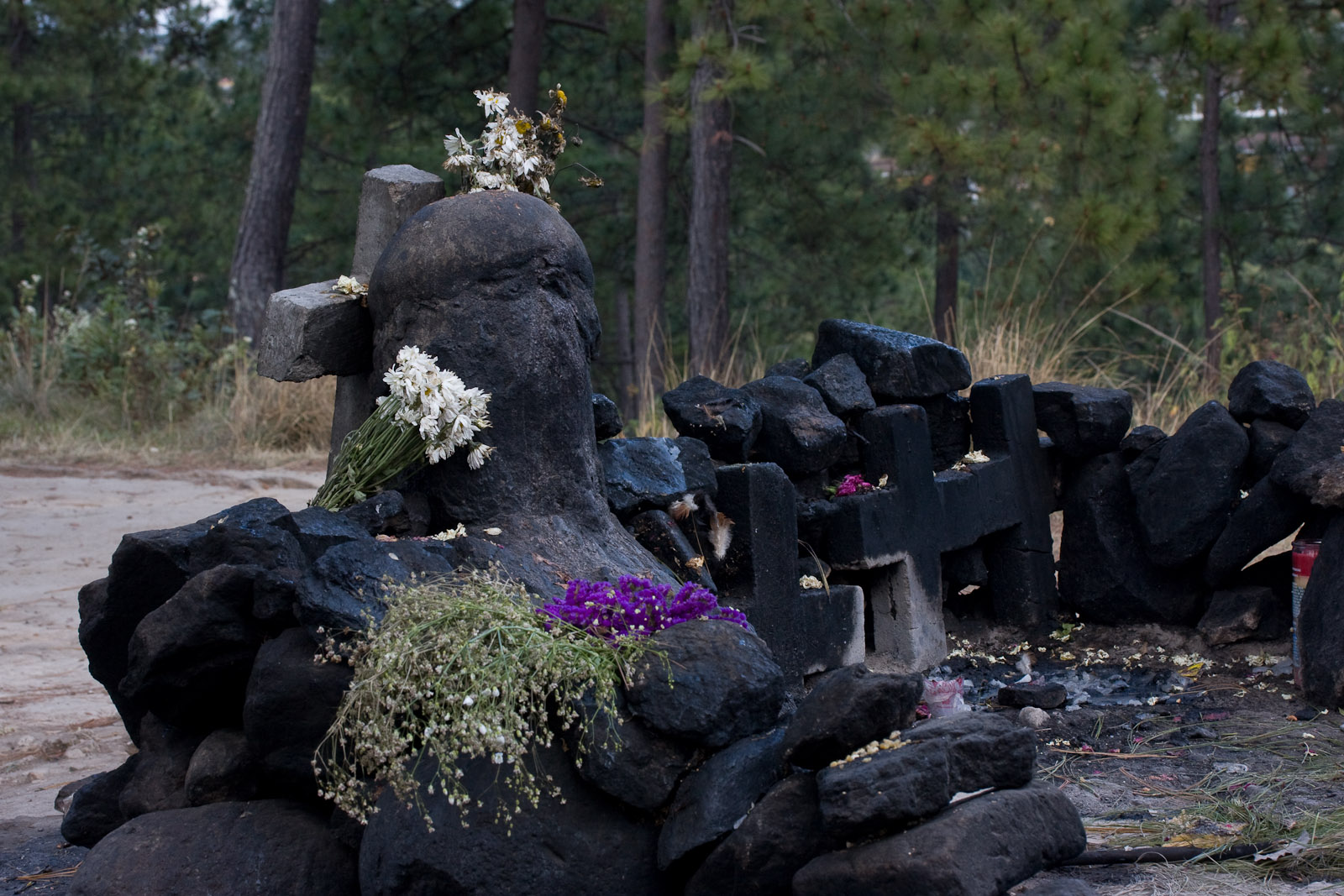
Front view of Pascual Abaj in 2008

After the Spanish conquest, the stone figure is said to have been carried away from a site in the village of Chichicastenango and reset upon the hill so offerings could be made away from the vigilance of the Catholic Church and the Spanish colonists.

Before it was defaced, the statue was described as a grotesque human figure with a large head and high, pointed forehead. It had two circular earspools in line with its mouth; its arms were crossed on its chest, with the fingers extended. A cord was sculpted around its waist, to which was attached the image of an inverted severed human head. It stood approximately 1 metre (3.3 ft) high. An observer in the 1950s noted that the figure appeared to have been buried sometime in the past.

Traditional Maya shamans regularly perform ceremonies at the shrine, by day and night. The statue is set upon a small altar surrounded by offerings, which include pine branches, crosses, flowers, copal resin, and items crafted from stone. The shrine has now become a popular tourist attraction where visitors witness traditional Maya ceremonies.

== Location ==
The shrine is located upon a wooded ridge overlooking the Chichicastenango valley, approximately 3 kilometres (1.9 mi) south of the town. The statue is set on a small plateau amongst pine forest.

== Etymology ==
Abaj means "stone" in several contemporary highland Maya languages, including Kʼicheʼ and Kaqchikel, while Pascual means "Easter" in Spanish. "King Pascual" has been recorded as the subject of veneration since at least the 19th century. Turcaj (spelled Turk'aj in modern Maya orthography) is the Kʼicheʼ name for the hill upon which the shrine is located.

== See also ==
- Maya stelae
- Potbelly sculpture
