= Jimena Antelo =

Bolivian engineer

- Jimena Antelo in April 2020
- Born: María Rene Duchén Cuéllar; 4 July 1972 (age 54); Santa Cruz de la Sierra, Bolivia
- Occupations: Engineer; journalist; television presenter
- Spouses: Diego Ascarrunz Pacheco (m. 1995; div. 2010) José Pomacusi (m. 2012)
- Children: 2

María Jimena Antelo Telchi (born 4 July 1972) is a Bolivian commercial engineer, journalist and television presenter.

== Early life and education ==
Antelo was born on 4 July 1972 in the Santa Cruz de la Sierra to Roger Antelo De Barneville y de María Beatriz Telchi. She began his school studies in 1978, graduating from high school in 1990 in her hometown. At just 16 years of age, Antelo became pregnant with her first child, Fernando Elío Antelo, who was born that same year. Antelo would continue with her professional studies, graduating as a commercial engineer with a specialization in journalism in Spain in 1996.

== Career ==
Antelo joined Bolivian television in 1993, working for the Red Bolivisión channel, where she remained for a period of five years until 1998. That same year, she went to work for the ATB Network. In 2000, at 28 years old, Antelo became pregnant with her second child, Diego Ascarrunz Antelo. In 2003, after three years, Antelo left the ATB Network, and went on to work at Unitel Bolivia, where she remained for most of her journalistic career until 2012. On the same channel, Antelo was the host of the debate program politician named "The Devil's Advocate".

In 2012, Antelo terminated her contract with Red Unitel. That same year, she began working at the PAT Network where she began hosting the nightly program "No Mentiras, Versión 4.0" (replacing journalist Sissy Añez). In 2013, she ventured into radio with her program Fama, Poder y Ganas. She is currently married to journalist José Pomacusi since 2012. On 5 December 2014, her eldest son, Fernando Elío Antelo, graduated from Diego Portales University as an industrial civil engineer in Santiago, Chile. In 2015, Jimena Antelo became a grandmother at 43 years of age, since that year her granddaughter Catalina Elío Roca would be born by her eldest son.
