= Gauchito Gil =

Argentine folk saint

Saint Gauchito Gil
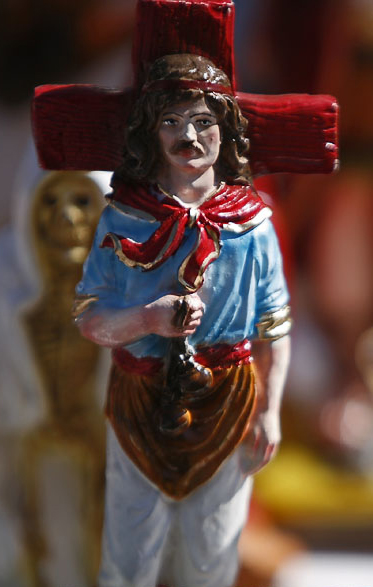
- A figure of Gauchito Gil in Argentina.

Little Gaucho Gil, Gaucho Saint, Folk Saint of Argentina
- Born: 1840s, allegedly 1847; Mercedes (formerly Pay Ubre), Argentine Confederation
- Died: 8 January 1878; Mercedes, Argentina
- Venerated in: Folk Catholicism
- Major shrine: Sanctuary of Gauchito Gil, Mercedes, Corrientes
- Feast: January 8
- Attributes: Gaucho standing in front of a red cross, holding bolas or a red cross, red bandana, blue shirt, espinillo tree
- Patronage: Gauchos, protection from harm, luck, fortune, good health, love, healing, outlaws, bravery, deserters, folk heroes, cowboys, safe passage

The Gauchito Gil (literally "Little Gaucho Gil") is a folk religious figure from Argentina. His cult is inspired by the purported historical figure of Antonio Mamerto Gil Núñez (c. 1847–1878), whose existence is not reliably documented. He is currently regarded as the most prominent folk saint in Argentina, although sanctuaries devoted to his cult are also found in Bolivia, Chile, Paraguay, Uruguay, and Spain.

== Legend ==
Antonio Gil was supposedly born in the 1840s near what is now the city of Mercedes (formerly "Pay Ubre") in the province of Corrientes, Argentina, where he grew up to become a gaucho. According to some accounts, in his youth he fought the local commissioner over the love of a woman—having pardoned the life of his rival, he was left with no choice but to leave town.

According to a different version of the legend, one night, after being conscripted to fight in the War of the Triple Alliance, Gil had a dream in which God told him to not kill innocent people. He consequently deserted the army and became a fugitive from justice.

According to yet another version, in the civil wars that followed the War of the Triple Alliance, he was a supporter of the Federalist Party, represented by the colour red, so when he was called up to fight in the ranks of the Unitarian army, he refused. Whatever the case was, after he fled from justice, he went on to become a thief, perhaps a cattle rustler, who stole from the rich and helped the poor. He was eventually caught on January 8, 1878 and sentenced to hang upside down from an espinillo tree, where his neck would be cut off. Before dying, he told the executioner that, upon arriving home, he would find his son very ill, but that he could be saved from death if the executioner prayed for Gil's intercession. The man did as the Gauchito had told him and his son was miraculously saved. In gratitude, he returned to the spot where Gil had been executed, buried him, and erected a cross of espinillo wood, thus giving birth to the cult.

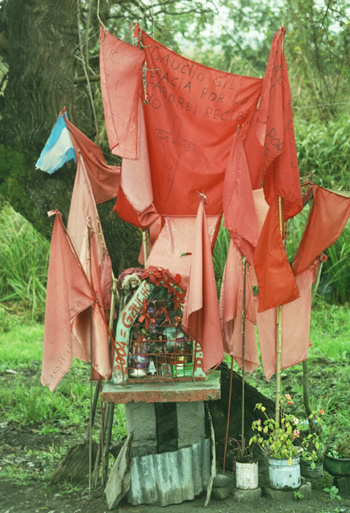
Traditional roadside shrine to Gauchito Gil in Santiago del Estero Province.

== Veneration ==
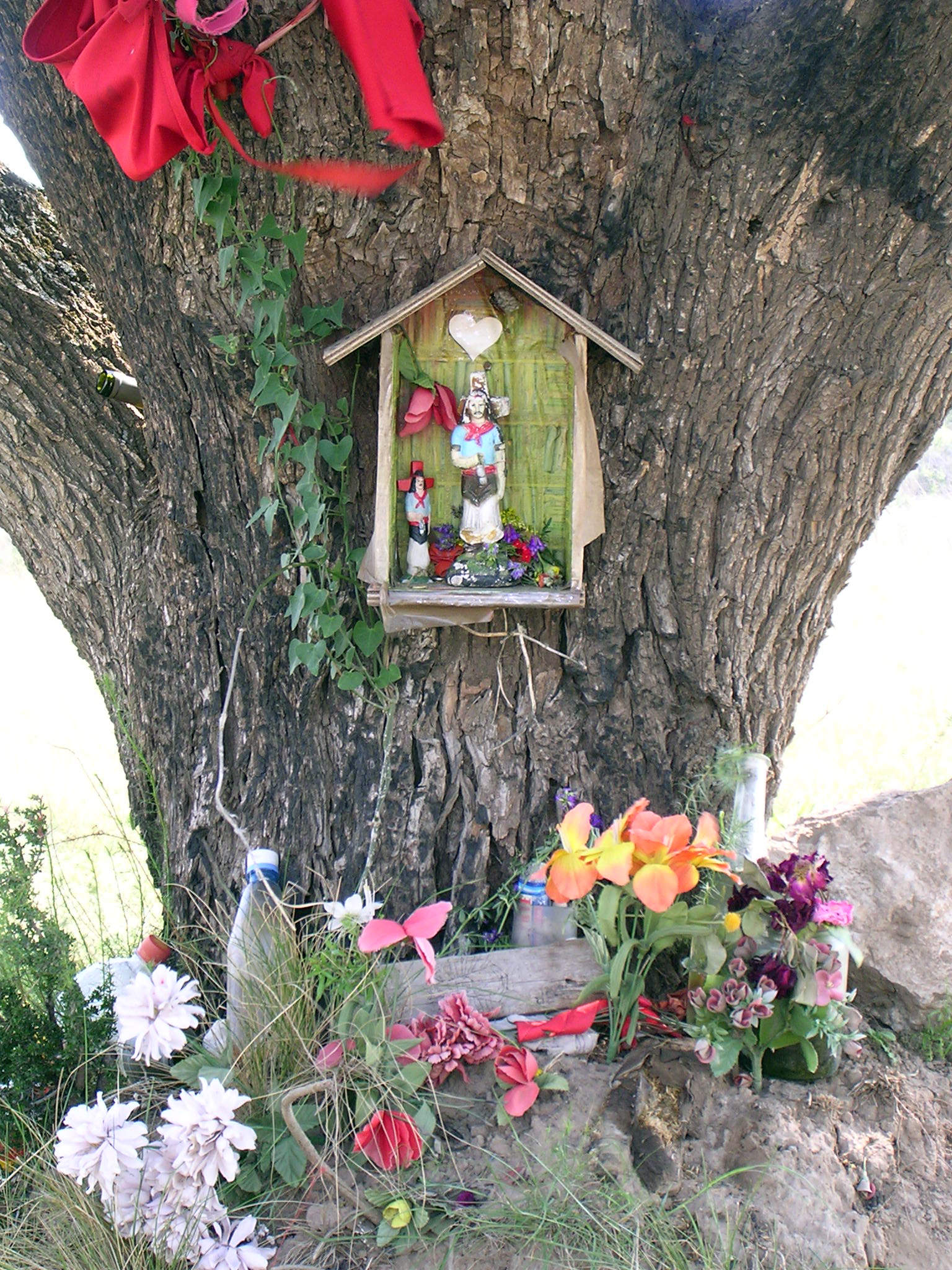
Gauchito Gil shrine, Argentina.

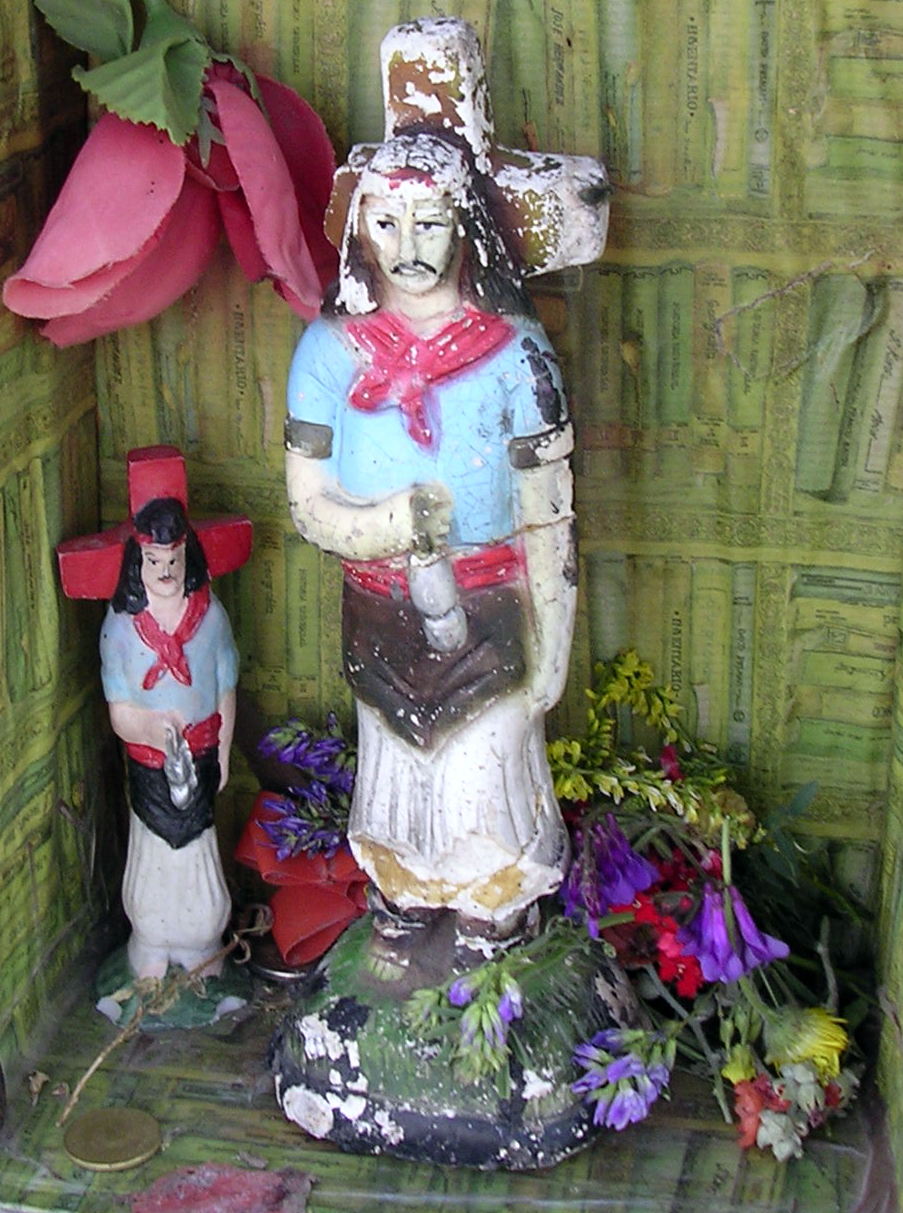
Closer view of Gauchito Gil shrine, Argentina.

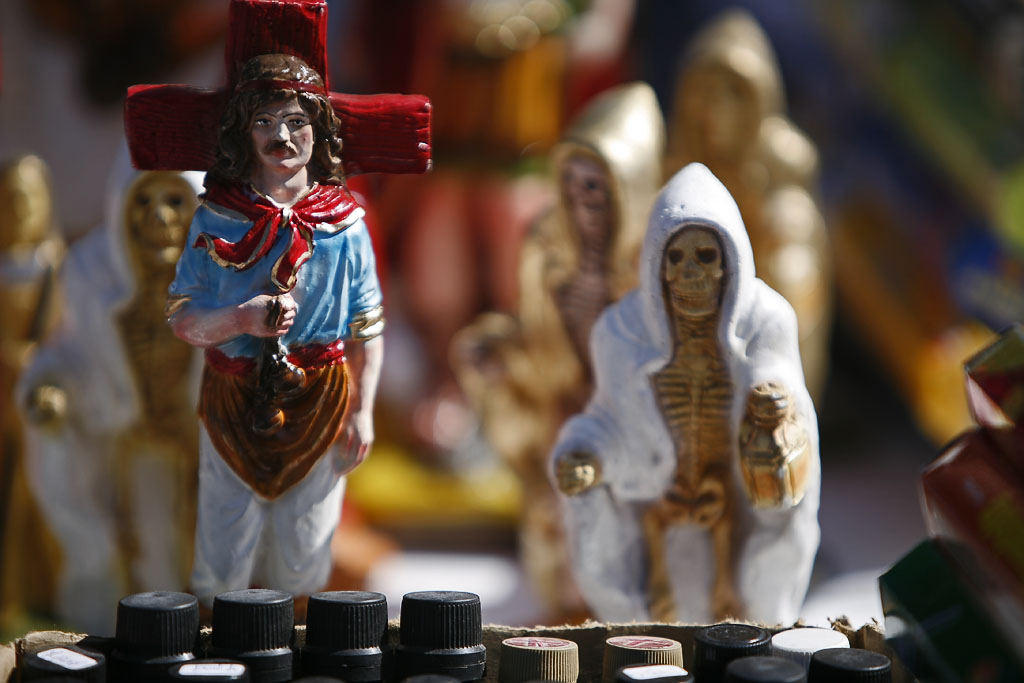
An image of Gauchito Gil (left) next to an image of San La Muerte (right).

Until the late twentieth century, devotion to Gauchito Gil was limited to the rural population of Corrientes and was of little relevance nationwide. In the 1990s, his cult experienced a sudden growth among the Argentine urban working classes, particularly in the Greater Buenos Aires area, where large numbers of people from the provinces had recently arrived in search of better living conditions. Since outlaw saints are usually regarded as figures of resistance to authority and champions of the underclasses, Gauchito Gil's rise in popularity can be interpreted as a reaction to the neoliberal politics of the period (see Menemism). The spread of the cult throughout the country was mainly the work of devout truck drivers, who were also responsible for erecting many of the roadside shrines dedicated to the saint. As of 2019, around 23% of Argentines considered themselves devotees of the Gauchito.

The main sanctuary of Gauchito Gil is located about 8 kilometers from the city of Mercedes, at the alleged site of his execution, and houses an empty mausoleum (i.e., a cenotaph) dedicated to his memory. The mausoleum's walls are adorned with some 50,000 plaques expressing gratitude for various miracles granted by the saint. To one side stands the tree where he was hanged. Offerings are left in the form of candles, red ribbons and flowers, cigarettes, and bottles of alcoholic drinks—things that the Gauchito is supposed to have liked when he was alive. The sanctuary's grounds cover about 5 hectares and are lined with stalls selling food, religious images, crosses, red ribbons and flags, rosaries, mates, facones, ponchos, and other souvenirs. The Mercedes sanctuary receives over 250,000 pilgrims a year, most of whom visit it for the saint's feast day on January 8. Festive activities on this date include masses, processions, dancing, drinking, and horse-riding demonstrations.

Other major sanctuaries are located in the cities of Buenos Aires (Plaza Los Andes and Puente La Noria), Posadas, Rosario, and San Roque, among others, as well as in the suburbs of Buenos Aires (Bernal, Alejandro Korn, Troncos del Talar, etc.). Small roadside shrines painted red and decorated with red flags and ribbons can be found scattered all over Argentina's roads, with special prevalence in the north of the country.

=== Gauchito Gil and the Catholic Church ===
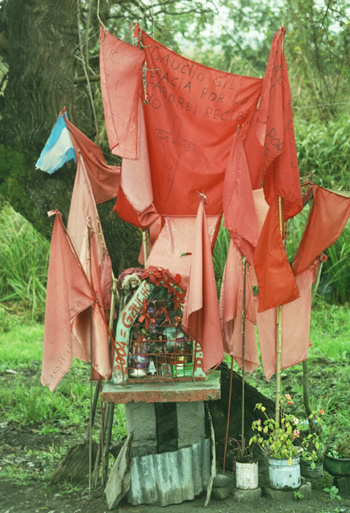
Traditional shrine to Gauchito Gil beside a road in Santiago del Estero.

Gauchito Gil is not recognized as a saint by the Catholic Church, though the vast majority of his devotees identify themselves as Catholics, and many Argentine devotees and church leaders have been promoting him for canonization. Local church leaders in Mercedes hold masses on his feast day in the Church of Our Lady of Mercy. Other church leaders in Argentina have participated and approved of the devotion of Gauchito Gil, while some are divided on whether to embrace or condemn the phenomenon. The Diocese of Goya and the Mexican Diocese of Celaya have both recognized the veneration of Gauchito Gil.

The structure of the devotion is compatible with the form of Catholic worship found in popular Catholicism. In the Americas, Spanish evangelization of the population resulted in a way of being Christian distinct from the European one, which the Church today recognizes as "popular Catholicism". There are many examples of popular devotions similar to that of Gauchito Gil in other parts of Latin America and even in European Christianity of the early centuries.

As can be seen in some theological studies, the Church seeks ways to understand and accompany this phenomenon of popular faith. Many Christian elements are recognized in this devotion. It is understood as:

"A history of freedom, martyrdom, and forgiveness that is penetrating ever more deeply into the hearts of our people, especially among the poor and marginalized. Many people, through this devotion, feel their lives daily enveloped by the merciful love of God. The intensity of the trust that many devotees place in the intercessory power of Antonio Gil is difficult to describe. Anyone who decides to listen to the devout people of this 'popular saint' will hear stories of lived faith rarely heard with more traditional saints".

Unlike other Argentine folk saints, such as San La Muerte, whose devotion is strictly prohibited by the Church, Gauchito Gil is tolerated by ecclesiastical leaders. Pope Francis, with his proposal of a "Church that goes forth", has been a proponent of this pastoral current that seeks to recognize God's work through this popular devotion that moves so many Christians. While still Archbishop of Buenos Aires, he promoted the publication of a novena to the Cruz Gil edited by the Diocese of Goya.

== See also ==
- María Lionza
- José Gregorio Hernández
- Jesús Malverde
