= Retalhuleu Airport =

Retalhuleu Airport Base Aérea del Sur
- IATA: RER; ICAO: MGRT

Summary
- Airport type: Military/Public
- Location: Retalhuleu, Guatemala
- Elevation AMSL: 656 ft / 200 m
- Coordinates: 14°31′16″N 091°41′50″W

Map
- Location in Retalhuleu Department Location in Guatemala

Runways
Direction	Length		Surface
Direction	m	ft	Surface
04/22	1,525	5,003	Asphalt

Statistics (2022)
- Passengers: 9,737
- Aircraft operations: 19,668
- Source: WAD GCM Google Maps DGAC

Retalhuleu Airport (IATA: RER, ICAO: MGRT), also known as Base Aérea del Sur, is an airport serving Retalhuleu, the capital of Retalhuleu Department in Guatemala.

The Retalhuleu non-directional beacon (Ident: REU) is located on the field.

== Statistics ==
The airport handled 1,442 passengers in 2016.

== Airlines and destinations ==
Airlines	Destinations
TAG Airlines	Guatemala City

== See also ==
- Transport in Guatemala
- List of airports in Guatemala
