= Huehuetenango Airport =

Airport in Guatemala

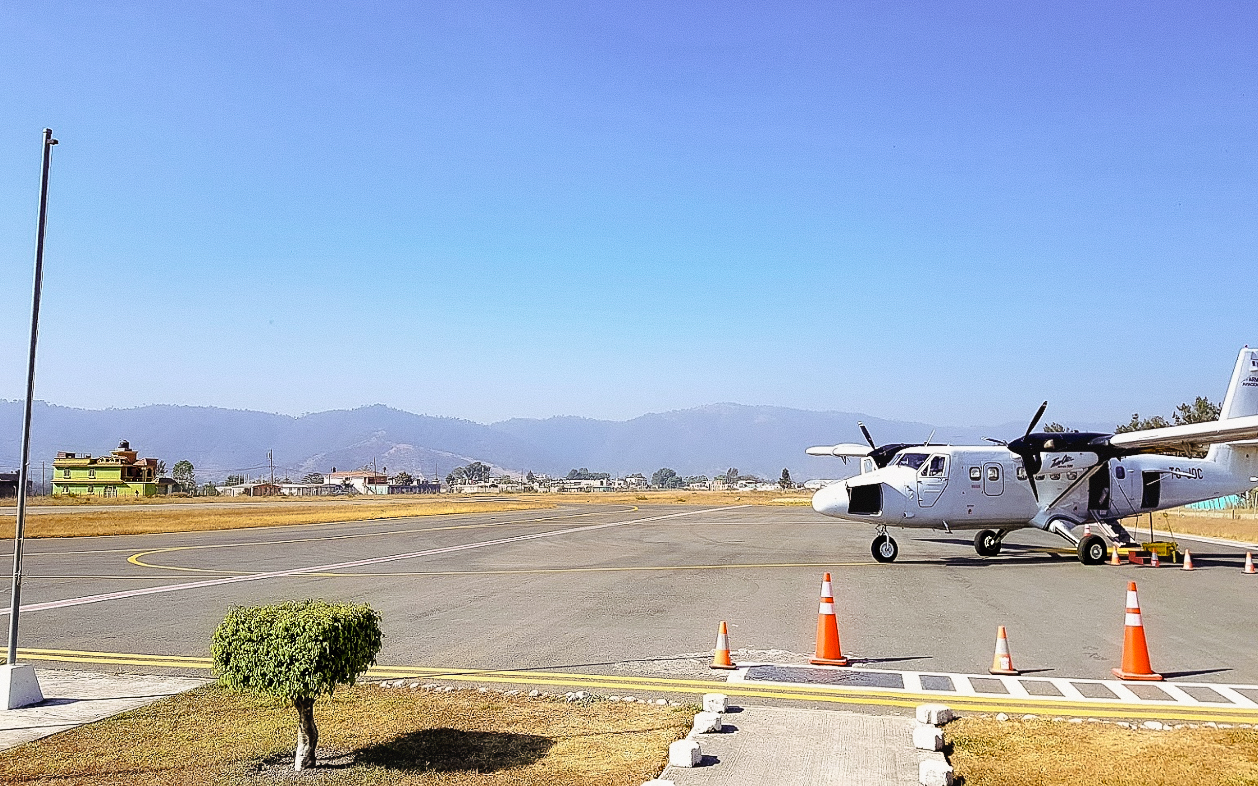
- IATA: HUG; ICAO: MGHT

Summary
- Airport type: Public
- Serves: Huehuetenango, Guatemala
- Elevation AMSL: 6,135 ft / 1,870 m
- Coordinates: 15°19′00″N 91°30′20″W

Map
- Location in Huehuetenango Department Location in Guatemala

Runways
Direction	Length		Surface
Direction	m	ft	Surface
06/24	825	2,707	Asphalt

Statistics (2022)
- Passengers: 12,218
- Aircraft operations: 3,130
- Source: Google Maps GCM SkyVector DGAC

Huehuetenango Airport (IATA: HUG, ICAO: MGHT) is an airport serving the city of Huehuetenango, the capital of Huehuetenango Department, Guatemala.

The airport is in the southwestern section of the city, which is in a high elevation basin. There is rising terrain 1.6 kilometres (1 mi) northwest of the runway, with distant mountainous terrain in all quadrants.

The Huehuetenango non-directional beacon (Ident: HUE) is located on the field.

== Airlines and destinations ==
Airlines	Destinations
ARM Aviación	Guatemala City
TAG Airlines	Guatemala City

== See also ==
- Transport in Guatemala
- List of airports in Guatemala
