= List of airports in Guatemala =

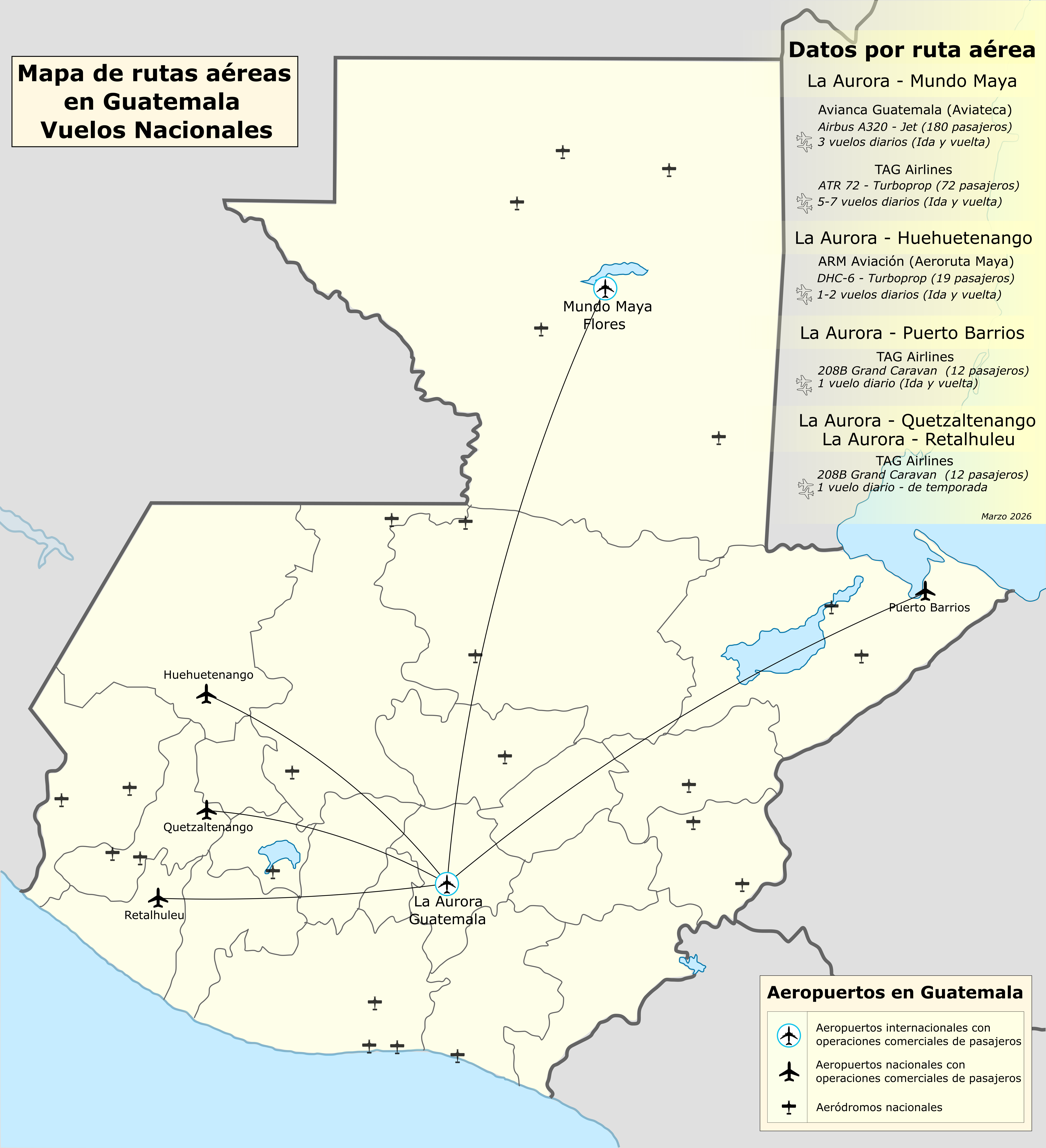
Domestic airline routes in Guatemala

Guatemala has a total of 402 airports and airstrips, of which three are international. The list of airports are sorted by department. The names in bold indicate that the airport has regular commercial operation of airlines for passengers.

== Airports ==
Names shown in bold indicate the airport has scheduled passenger service on commercial airlines.

Location served	Department	ICAO	IATA	Airport name
Carmelita	El Petén	MGCR	CMM	Carmelita Airport
Chiquimula	Chiquimula		CIQ	Chiquimula Airport
Coatepeque	Quetzaltenango	MGCT	CTF	Coatepeque Airport
Cobán	Alta Verapaz	MGCB	CBV	Cobán Airport
Esquipulas	Chiquimula	MGES		Esquipulas Airport
Flores	El Petén	MGMM	FRS	**Mundo Maya International Airport**
Guatemala City	Guatemala	MGGT	GUA	**La Aurora International Airport**
Huehuetenango	Huehuetenango	MGHT	HUG	**Huehuetenango Airport**
La Libertad	El Petén	MGLL		La Libertad Airport
Malacatán	San Marcos	MGML		Malacatán Airport
Masagua	Escuintla		ENJ	El Naranjo Airport
Morales	Izabal	MGBN		Bananera Airport
Playa Grande Ixcán	El Quiché	MGPG	PKJ	Playa Grande Airport
Poptún	El Petén	MGPP	PON	Poptún Airport
Puerto Barrios	Izabal	MGPB	PBR	**Puerto Barrios Airport**
Puerto San José	Escuintla	MGSJ	GSJ	San José Airport
Quetzaltenango	Quetzaltenango	MGQZ	AAZ	**Quetzaltenango Airport**
Quiché	El Quiché	MGQC	AQB	Quiché Airport
Retalhuleu	Retalhuleu	MGRT	RER	**Retalhuleu Airport** / Base Aérea del Sur
Río Dulce	Izabal	MGRD	LCF	Río Dulce Airport
Rubelsanto	Alta Verapaz	MGRB	RUV	Rubelsanto Airport
San Marcos	San Marcos	MGSM		San Marcos
Uaxactun	El Petén		UAX	Uaxactun Airport
Zacapa	Zacapa	MGZA		Zacapa Airport

== Unauthorized airstrips ==
There are numerous unauthorized airstrips used to facilitate drug trafficking in the region, with as many as 66 such airstrips in the vicinity of the Maya Biosphere Reserve alone.

== See also ==
- Guatemalan Air Force
- Transportation in Guatemala
- List of airports by ICAO code: M#MG - Guatemala
- List of aviation accidents and incidents in Guatemala
- Wikipedia: WikiProject Aviation/Airline destination lists: North America#Guatemala
