= San José Airport (Guatemala) =

Airport in Guatemala

- IATA: GSJ; ICAO: MGSJ

Summary
- Airport type: Military/public
- Operator: DGAC
- Serves: Puerto San José, Guatemala
- Elevation AMSL: 29 ft (8.8 m)
- Coordinates: 13°56′10″N 90°50′09″W

Map
- Location in Escuintla Department Location in Guatemala

Runways
Direction	Length		Surface
Direction	m	ft	Surface
15/33	2,010	6,594	Asphalt

Statistics (2022)
- Passengers: 4,060
- Aircraft operartions: 22,573
- Source: GCM WAD DGAC

San José Airport (IATA: GSJ, ICAO: MGSJ) (Aeropuerto de Puerto San José, Escuintla) serves the city of Puerto San José, the resort town of Monterrico, the port of Puerto Quetzal and the eastern Guatemalan Pacific coast. It is operated and administrated by DGAC - Dirección General de Aeronáutica Civil de Guatemala. San José Airport is in the western part of the city of Puerto San José, near the Pacific coast.

== Facilities ==
The airport was refurbished in the early 2000s, reopening in September 2007, as part of a nationwide airport rehabilitation program.

== Airlines ==
- Transportes Aéreos Guatemaltecos (charter flights)
- Air Venture Tours (charter flights only)

== See also ==
- Transport in Guatemala
- List of airports in Guatemala
