= List of aviation accidents and incidents in Guatemala =

This is a list of aviation accidents and incidents in Guatemala.

Date	Registration	Aircraft type	Operator	Location	Country	Fatalities	Article	Notes
Civilian aircraft
1925		Farman F.40	CCNA	Puerto Barrios	Guatemala	0		
7 May 1935		Ford Trimotor	private	Lake Izabal	Guatemala	1		
10 Oct 1936	NC14273	Douglas DC-2-118B	Panagra	Guatemala City	Guatemala			
1937		Caudron C.630 Simoun	private	Guatemala City	Guatemala			
15 Dec 1953	TG-AQA	Curtiss C-46	Aviateca	Mt Tecpan	Guatemala	2		
8 Oct 1954	TG-AJA	Douglas C-47	Aviateca	Guatemala City	Guatemala	0		
24 May 1956	TG-AHA	Douglas C-47	Aviateca	Panzos	Guatemala	30		
5 Apr 1962	TG-APA	Douglas DC-3	Aviateca	Guatemala City	Guatemala	0		
9 Aug 1969	N787N	Mooney M20E		Escuintla	Guatemala	1		
15 Mar 1971	TG-ABA	Douglas DC-6	Aviateca	Guatemala	Guatemala	0		
11 May 1971	TG-ACA	Curtiss C-46	Aviateca	Guatemala City	Guatemala	5		
13 Dec 1972	TG-HIH	Beechcraft D18S	Private	Tunica (Mississippi)	USA	0		
17 Nov 1973	HP-564	Pilatus PC-6/C-H2 Turbo Porter	STOL of Panama	Cerro El Ratón, Chiquimula	Guatemala			
29 Dec 1974	TG-HTM	Lockheed 18 LodeStar	Erwin Ortiz	Tikal	Guatemala	24		
25 Jan 1975	TG-AMM	Beechcraft D18S	Private (G.M. Sanabria)	Sayaxché	Guatemala	1		
5 Sep 1975	TG-JOT	Rockwell Commander 500	TAG	Alta Verapaz	Guatemala	1		
18 Nov 1975	TG-AGA	Douglas DC-3	Aviateca	Petén	Guatemala	15		
20 Nov 1976	TG-TEX	Cessna 185		San Juan Cotzal	Guatemala	4		
22 Apr 1977	TG-ACA	Convair CV-440	Aviateca	Guatemala City	Guatemala	28	1977 Aviateca Convair 240 crash	
30 Sep 1977	TG-AKA	Douglas DC-3	Aviateca	Santa Elena	Guatemala	1		
30 May 1978	TG-LAM	Douglas DC-3	Oneida	Santo Tomas	Guatemala	0		
8 Jun 1978	TG-ADA	Douglas DC-3	Aviateca	Guatemala City	Guatemala	3		
20 Jul 1978	TG-PAW	Douglas DC-3	Aero Express	Tikal	Guatemala	0		
26 Jul 1978	TG-ATA	Douglas DC-3	Aviateca	San Andres Flores	Guatemala	0		
26 Mar 1979		Bell helicopter	Helicópteros de Guatemala	24 km NE of Guatemala-City	Guatemala	7		
7 May 1979	TG-SAB	Douglas DC-3	Transportes Aéreos Profesionales Guatemaltecas	Santa Elena	Guatemala	0		
3 Nov 1980	TG-BAC	Douglas DC-3	Aero Express	Yaxchibal	Guatemala	7		
11 Dec 1981	TG-BOC	Pilatus PC-6 Turbo Porter	Centravia Servicios Aéreos	Guatemala	Guatemala	0		
14 Jul 1982	TG-BOC	Pilatus PC-6/B2-H2 Turbo Porter	Centravia SA		Guatemala			
16 Jan 1983	TG-SAB	Douglas DC-3	Private	Bay City (Texas)	USA	0		
29 Jun 1985	TG-AKE	Pilatus PC-6/B2-H2 Turbo Porter	Tukan SA		Guatemala	0		
18 Jan 1986	HC-BAE	Sud Aviation SE-210 Caravelle III	Aerovias Guatemala	Flores	Guatemala	93	1986 Aerovias Guatemala air crash	
21 Nov 1993	TG-ACP	Beech Queen Air 80	Aerovias Guatemala	Guatemala City	Guatemala	13		
9 Aug 1994	TG-HUY	Bell UH-1B	Servicios Aereos Profesionales	Salamá	Guatemala	5		
14 Dec 1995	N503U	Aero Commander 1121	American Air Network	Guatemala City	Guatemala	2		
1 Jan 1996	TG-JAN	Dornier Do-28D-2 Skyservant	private		Guatemala	0		
16 Feb 1996	TG-JAK	De Havilland DHC-6	Aviones Comerciales de Guatemala	El Quiché	Guatemala	2		
23 Jun 1996	TG-CUB	Piper PA-18	private	Iztapa	Guatemala	2		
1 Nov 1996	TG-TPA	Embraer EMB-110	Transportes Aéreos Profesionales Guatemalteca	San Andrés Flores	Guatemala	16		
17 Mar 1998	C-GAHW	Bell 212	Alpine Helicopters for MINUGUA	Aguacatán	Guatemala	7		
16 Sep 1999	TG-RBK	Rockwell Commander 500S	Procafe (Ricardo Balzaretti Kriete)	La Tinta	Guatemala	6		
13 Oct 1999	TG-AMA	Bell 206L-1 LongRanger II	Unknown	Quetzaltenango	Guatemala	2		
18 Oct 1999	TG-ROF	Cessna 182P	private	Cobán	Guatemala	3		
21 Dec 1999	F-GTDI	McDonnell Douglas DC-10	Cubana de Aviación	Guatemala City	Guatemala	18	Cubana de Aviación Flight 1216	
25 Feb 2000	TG-TRO	Cessna 210	Oro Negro	Puerto Barrios	Guatemala	3		
17 Apr 2000	N59143	Cessna TU206F	Wings of Hope	Nebaj	Guatemala	7		
18 May 2000	TG-JOR	Cessna 182P	private	Cobán	Guatemala	4		
4 May 2001	TG-CEG	Cessna 182J	Antonio Arevalo Posadas	Cobán	Guatemala	5		
18 Aug 2001	TG-CFE	Let 410	Atlantic Airlines	Guatemala City	Guatemala	8		
1 Sep 2003	TG-HDG	Bell 206L-3 LongRanger III	Helicopteros de Guatemala	Sololá	Guatemala	4		
2 Jun 2005	TG-TAG	Let 410	TAG	Zacapa	Guatemala	0		
26 Jul 2005	TG-APG	Cessna 208 Grand Caravan	Aéreo Ruta Maya	Hierba Buena	Guatemala	2		
30 Jun 2006	TG-LUK	Cessna T210N		Poptún	Guatemala	5		
22 Feb 2007		Maule	Private	Guatemala	Guatemala	1		
13 Aug 2007	TG-KDL	Piper PA-34 Seneca	private	km 14.5 of Atlantico Highway	Guatemala	6		
29 Jul 2008	TG-MYR	Cessna 150L		San Miguel Petapa	Guatemala	0		
1 Aug 2008	N538JP	Cessna 336 Skymaster	Great Commission Air	San Luis Chicoyou	Guatemala	0		
24 Aug 2008	TG-JCS	Cessna 208 Grand Caravan	Aereo Ruta Maya	Cabañas	Guatemala	11	2008 Aéreo Ruta Maya crash	
30 Oct 2008	TG-VIC	Aérospatiale AS 350B2		San Isidro, Alta Verapaz	Guatemala	4		
14 May 2009	TG-ALD	Piper PA-23-250 Aztec C	Aeroservicios	Guatemala City	Guatemala	6		
7 Mar 2010	TG-ELE	Bell 206L-3 LongRanger III	Helicopteros de Guatemala SA	Guatemala City	Guatemala	0		
7 Mar 2010	TG-HPS	Aérospatiale/Eurocopter AS 350B3 Ecureuil	private	Iztapa	Guatemala	1		
10 Mar 2010	TG-JYM	Cessna 421 Golden Eagle	Copreca	Tegucigalpa	Honduras	3		
26 May 2010	TG-LAP	Piper PA-31-325 Navajo	Ocean City Comercial SA	Guatemala City	Guatemala	4		
23 Jun 2010	N430LA	Piper PA-31-350 (Colemill Panther II conv.)	New Life Search & Development Inc.	Puerto Barrios	Guatemala	2		
10 Jan 2011	N431SR	Cirrus SR20 GTS	Thomas G. Russel (rgd. owner & pilot)	Santiago Atitlán	Guatemala	1		
8 Jul 2011	TG-MUK	Bell 206L-4 LongRanger IV		Giralda Santa Cruz village	Guatemala	2		
28 Feb 2012	TG-SAN	Bell 206B JetRanger III	Unknown	Near Rio Dulce, Guatemala	Guatemala	0		
8 Mar 2012	TG-JAB	Rockwell Shrike Commander	CM Airlines	Plan de La Laguna	Honduras	2		
15 Apr 2012	TG-	Bell 206L LongRanger	Private	Antigua	Guatemala	0		
21 Apr 2012	TG-VCH	Piper PA-23-250 Aztec	Private	Aurora Zoo, Guatemala City	Guatemala	3		
11 May 2012	N171FL	Convair CV-580F SCD	Contract Air Cargo (IFL Group)	Guatemala City	Guatemala	0		
8 Jun 2012	TG-KOD	Piper PA-25-260 Pawnee		Ocós, San Marcos	Guatemala	1		
8 Aug 2012	TG-RPL	Aérospatiale AS 350 B2B Ecureuil		Escuintla	Guatemala	0		
Military aircraft
28 Sep 1929		Ryan B-1 Brougham	Cuerpo de Aeronautica Militar Guatemala		Guatemala	4		
22 Nov 1940	37-586	Douglas B-18A Bolo	United States Army Air Corps (USAAC)	Guatemala City	Guatemala			
22 Nov 1940	38-603	Douglas B-18A Bolo	United States Army Air Corps (USAAC)	Guatemala City	Guatemala			
19 Jan 1942	38–220	Boeing B-17B Flying Fortress	United States Army Air Force (USAAF)	San José	Guatemala			
18 Feb 1942	38-264	Boeing B-17B Flying Fortress	United States Army Air Force (USAAF)	Guatemala City	Guatemala			
5 Jun 1942	33–122	Boeing P-26A Peashooter	(USAAF)	Near Mixco	Guatemala			
15 Jun 1942	41-6751	Bell P-39D Airacobra	(USAAF)	Aguacatán	Guatemala			
23 Jun 1942	41-13477	Curtiss P-40C Warhawk	(USAAF)	Patzún	Guatemala			
23 Jun 1942	41-13490	Curtiss P-40C Warhawk	(USAAF)	Patzún	Guatemala			
28 Sep 1942	41-9036	Boeing B-17E Flying Fortress	USAAF)	Fraijanes	Guatemala			
30 Oct 1942	33-098	Boeing P-26A Peashooter	(USAAF)	20 mi E of San José	Guatemala			
11 Jun 1943	41-23664	Consolidated B-24D Liberator	(USAAF)	San José	Guatemala			
31 Jan 1944	41-23676	Consolidated B-24D Liberator	(USAAF)	San José	Guatemala			
8 May 1944	43-4557	North American B-25H Mitchell	(USAAF)	San José	Guatemala			
5 Oct 1944	40-275	Stinson L-1 Vigilant	(USAAF)	Santa Lucía La Reforma	Guatemala			
21 May 1945	44-47256	Beechcraft C-45F Expeditor	(USAAF)	Northwest Fld	Guatemala			
17 Apr 1946	44-89030	Republic P-47N Thunderbolt	(USAAF)	Tiquisate	Guatemala			
17 Apr 1947	45-50002	Republic P-47N Thunderbolt	(USAAF)	Tiquisate/ 14mi SSE	Guatemala			
27 Oct 1951	961	Douglas C-47	Guatemalan Military	San Andrés Flores	Guatemala	27		
		IAI Arava 201	Guatemalan Military	Guatemala City	Guatemala	11		
28 Feb 1980		Douglas C-47	Guatemalan Military	Alta Verapaz	Guatemala	31		
17 Apr 1980	FAES-1	Piper PA-31 Navajo	Fuerza Aérea de El Salvador	Guatemala City	Guatemala			
27 Jun 2008	TG-HOF	Bell 206L-1 LongRanger II	Guatemalan Navy	Cubulco	Guatemala	4		
21 May 2010	FAG 036	Cessna T210 Turbo Centurion	Guatemalan Air Force	Puerto Quetzal	Guatemala	0		
28 Feb 2012	HL-190	Bell UH-1H Iroquois	Guatemalan Air Force	Chacalté, San Luis	Guatemala	10		
