= Puerto Barrios Airport =

Airport in Guatemala

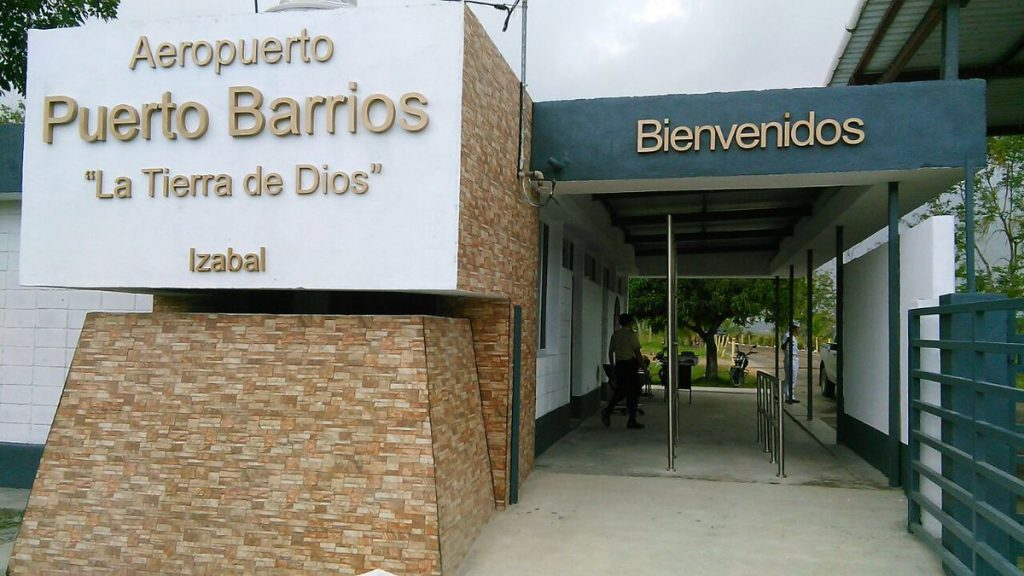
- IATA: PBR; ICAO: MGPB

Summary
- Airport type: Military/Public
- Operator: DGAC
- Serves: Puerto Barrios, Guatemala
- Elevation AMSL: 33 ft (10 m)
- Coordinates: 15°43′50″N 88°35′00″W

Map
- Location in Izabal Department Location in Guatemala

Runways
Direction	Length		Surface
Direction	m	ft	Surface
12/30	2,707	8,881	Concrete

Statistics (2022)
- Passengers: 17,140
- Aircraft operations: 3,085
- Source: WAD DGAC

Puerto Barrios Airport (Spanish: Aeropuerto de Puerto Barrios, IATA: PBR, ICAO: MGPB), formerly Izabal Air Base (Base Aérea de Izabal), serves the city of Puerto Barrios, the port of Santo Tomás de Castilla and the Guatemalan Caribbean. It is operated and administrated by Dirección General de Aeronáutica Civil (DGAC).

== History ==
Puerto Barrios Airport is located in the northern part of the city of Puerto Barrios, near the shore of Amatique Bay.

In the 1920s and 30s Puerto Barrios was a seaplane destination only; a first concrete runway was built by the United States Government during World War II for strategic reasons. It was later used by the Guatemalan Air Force, known under the name "Base Aérea de Izabal". In 2002, the airport was equipped with a VOR-DME radio beacon with the help of COCESNA, the Central American Corporation for Air Navigation. Being located near the port of Santo Tomás de Castilla, today the airport is of special interest for cruise ship operators, who carry passengers to important attractions throughout the country on chartered flights. Puerto Barrios has always been a logistics center, which is emphasized in the city seal, which depicts a ship, a train, an airplane, and a truck.

In January 2017, the airport was undergoing renovations. The DGCA was investing 1.5 million Guatemalan quetzals into the project, which it expected to complete by 28 March.

== Aviation in Puerto Barrios ==
=== Past ===
- In 1925 SCADTA of Colombia made a historical journey with two Dornier Wal flyboats from Barranquilla to Palm Beach stopping in Panama, Costa Rica, Nicaragua, El Salvador, Puerto San José, Amatitlán, Puerto Barrios, Cozumel, Havana and Miami.
- In 1928 a Curtiss Falcon supported by the Colombian government, called "Ricaurte" flew from New York City to Bogotá, stopping in Jacksonville, Havana, Puerto Barrios, Puerto Cabezas, Colón, Cartagena and Barranquilla. The plane suffered a mechanical failure in Puerto Barrios, which delayed it there for several days.
- In the 1930s, Pan American World Airways had scheduled flights from Miami to San Salvador stopping in Havana, Cozumel, Mérida, Belize and Puerto Barrios, using Sikorsky 40 flying boats.

=== After World War II ===
- In the 1950s and 60s, Aviateca, the former national airline, connected Puerto Barrios with other destinations in Guatemala.
- Inter Regional, a regional subsidiary of Grupo TACA in Guatemala, offered scheduled flights to Guatemala City from 1999, using Cessna Grand Caravan aircraft. There were up to two daily flights (TA 1911, TA 1920, 1923). Two times a week there was a scheduled stop at Rio Dulce airstrip on the incoming flight. Flying time to Guatemala City was scheduled with 1 hour, 05 minutes. There were also flights from Mundo Maya International Airport to San Pedro Sula stopping in Puerto Barrios. All scheduled flights were suspended in 2002 due to lack of demand.

== Airlines and destinations ==
Airlines	Destinations
TAG Airlines	Guatemala City

== Incidents ==
- 24 May 1956: A Douglas C-47 on a scheduled Aviateca flight crashed at Panzós after leaving Puerto Barrios. 30 occupants were killed.
- 15 November 1960: A Beechcraft AT-11 of the Guatemalan Air Force made a belly landing after a mechanical failure on a night flight.
- 28 April 2007: A Cessna 210 (TG-MAP) crashes on a private flight between Puerto Barrios and San Pedro Sula, killing the pilot.

== See also ==
- Transport in Guatemala
- List of airports in Guatemala
