= Poptún Airport =

- IATA: PON; ICAO: MGPP

Summary
- Airport type: Public
- Serves: Poptún, Guatemala
- Elevation AMSL: 1,693 ft / 516 m
- Coordinates: 16°19′35″N 89°25′00″W

Map
- Location in Petén Department Location in Guatemala

Runways
Direction	Length		Surface
Direction	m	ft	Surface
09/27	2,730	8,957	Gravel

Statistics (2022)
- Aircraft operations: 526
- Source: Google Maps GCM DGAC

Poptún Airport (IATA: PON, ICAO: MGPP) is an airport serving the town of Poptún in Guatemala.

The runway is within the town. There are low hills 2 kilometres (1.2 mi) south of the airport.

== See also ==
- Transport in Guatemala
- List of airports in Guatemala
