= CTF =

CTF may refer to:

== Finance ==
- Canadian Television Fund, financing mechanism
- Child Trust Fund, a UK child savings scheme
- Clean Technology Fund, of the World Bank
- Counter terrorism financing

== Organizations and associations ==
- Cambridge Theological Federation, association of colleges etc. in Cambridge, England
- Canadian Taxpayers Federation
- Canadian Teachers' Federation
- Children's Tumor Foundation, United States, supports those with neurofibromatosis/schwannomatosis
- Cyprus Tennis Federation
- Chow Tai Fook, Hong Kong based conglomerate

== Science and technology ==
- Capture the flag (cybersecurity), an educational exercise in computer security
- Charge trap flash, semiconductor memory technology
- Chlorine trifluoride, a highly corrosive chemical
- Collaborative Translation Framework, a platform designed by Microsoft to improve machine translation through (possibly crowdsourced) user contributions
- Computer to film, an imaging technology used in lithographic printing
- Contrast threshold function, in physiological imaging
- Contrast transfer function, in general imaging
- Controlled thermonuclear fusion
- CTF, an undocumented Windows protocol involved with the Microsoft Text Services Framework
- Cut-through forwarding, a methodology used in network hardware

== Transport ==
- Catford railway station (National Rail station code), London, England
- Coatepeque Airport (IATA code), Guatemala

== Other uses ==
- Capture the flag, a traditional outdoor game often played by children
- Colorado tick fever
- Commander, Task force
- Controlled Traffic Farming, a soil protection driving strategy
- Correctional Training Facility at Soledad, California
