= Chiquimula Airport =

Airport in Guatemala

- IATA: CIQ; ICAO: none

Summary
- Airport type: Public
- Serves: Chiquimula, Guatemala
- Elevation AMSL: 1,122 ft / 342 m
- Coordinates: 14°49′50″N 89°31′15″W

Map
- Location in Petén Department Location in Guatemala

Runways
Direction	Length		Surface
Direction	m	ft	Surface
02/20	880	2,887	Asphalt

Statistics (2022)
- Passengers: 2,347
- Aircraft operations: 2,331
- Source: GCM Google Maps SkyVector DGAC

Chiquimula Airport (IATA: CIQ) is an airport serving Chiquimula, the capital of Chiquimula Department, Guatemala. The airport is 3 kilometres (1.9 mi) north of the city, alongside the CA10 road.

There is nearby mountainous terrain north through southeast of the airport, and distant mountainous terrain in other quadrants.

== See also ==
- Transport in Guatemala
- List of airports in Guatemala
