= San Marcos Airport (Guatemala) =

- IATA: none; ICAO: MGSM

Summary
- Airport type: Public
- Serves: San Marcos, Guatemala
- Elevation AMSL: 7,933 ft / 2,418 m
- Coordinates: 14°57′20″N 91°48′25″W

Map
- Location in San Marcos Department Location in Guatemala

Runways
| Direction | Length | | Surface |
| Direction | m | ft | Surface |
|---|---|---|---|
| 06/24 | 1,175 | 3,855 | Asphalt |

Statistics (2022)
- Passengers: 653
- Aircraft operations: 219
- Source: Google Maps GCM SkyVector DGAC

San Marcos Airport (ICAO: MGSM) is a high elevation airport serving the city of San Marcos, the capital of San Marcos Department in Guatemala. The airport is on the southwest side of the city.

San Marcos is in a high mountain basin. There is nearby mountainous terrain north and south of the airport, and distant mountainous terrain to the east and west.

The Tapachula VOR-DME (Ident: TAP) is located 34.5 nautical miles (63.9 km) west-southwest of the airport.

== See also ==
- Transport in Guatemala
- List of airports in Guatemala
