= Rubelsanto Airport =

Airport in Guatemala

- IATA: RUV; ICAO: MGRB

Summary
- Airport type: Public
- Serves: Rubelsanto, Guatemala
- Elevation AMSL: 426 ft / 130 m
- Coordinates: 15°59′30″N 90°26′40″W

Map
- Location in Alta Verapaz Department Location in Guatemala

Runways
Direction	Length		Surface
Direction	m	ft	Surface
08/26	1,430	4,692	Asphalt
- Source: GCM Google Maps

Rubelsanto Airport (IATA: RUV, ICAO: MGRB) is an airport serving the village of Rubelsanto in Alta Verapaz Department, Guatemala.

The Rubelsanto non-directional beacon (Ident: RUB) is on the field.

== See also ==
- Transport in Guatemala
- List of airports in Guatemala
