= Coatepeque Airport =

- IATA: CTF; ICAO: MGCT

Summary
- Airport type: Public
- Location: Coatepeque, Guatemala
- Elevation AMSL: 1,486 ft (453 m)
- Coordinates: 14°41′40″N 91°52′55″W

Map
- Location in Quetzaltenango Department Location in Guatemala

Runways
Direction	Length		Surface
Direction	m	ft	Surface
07/25	900	2,953	Asphalt

Statistics (2022)
- Passengers: 1,527
- Aircraft operations: 604
- Source: GCM SkyVector DGAC

Coatepeque Airport (IATA: CTF, ICAO: MGCT) is an airport serving Coatepeque, a city in the Quetzaltenango Department of Guatemala. The airport is in a wooded area on the southwest side of town. It has a small terminal and a runway 900 meters long.

== See also ==
- Transport in Guatemala
- List of airports in Guatemala
