= El Naranjo Airport =

- IATA: ENJ; ICAO: none

Summary
- Airport type: Public
- Serves: Masagua, Guatemala
- Elevation AMSL: 140 ft / 43 m
- Coordinates: 14°06′25″N 90°49′03″W

Map
- Location in Escuintla Department Location in Guatemala

Runways
Direction	Length		Surface
Direction	m	ft	Surface
17/35	840	2,756	Grass
- Source: Google Maps GCM

El Naranjo Airport (IATA: ENJ) is a rural airstrip near El Naranjo, a settlement in the diffuse agricultural community between Masagua, Obero, and Torremolinos in Escuintla Department, Guatemala.

The San Jose VOR-DME (Ident: SJO) is located 10.5 nautical miles (19.4 km) south of the airstrip.

== See also ==
- Transport in Guatemala
- List of airports in Guatemala
