= Bananera Airport =

- IATA: none; ICAO: MGBN

Summary
- Airport type: Private
- Serves: Morales, Guatemala
- Elevation AMSL: 753 ft / 230 m
- Coordinates: 15°28′30″N 88°50′15″W

Map
- Location in Izabal Department Location in Guatemala

Runways
Direction	Length		Surface
Direction	m	ft	Surface
09/27	955	3,133	Asphalt
- Source: Google Maps GCM

Bananera Airport (ICAO: MGBN) is an airport serving the city of Morales in Izabal Department, Guatemala.

The runway is within the city. The Puerto Barrios VOR-DME (Ident: IOS) is located 21.4 nautical miles (39.6 km) northeast of the airstrip.

== See also ==
- Transport in Guatemala
- List of airports in Guatemala
