= Zacapa Airport =

- IATA: none; ICAO: MGZA

Summary
- Airport type: Public
- Serves: Zacapa
- Elevation AMSL: 633 ft / 193 m
- Coordinates: 14°57′35″N 89°32′20″W

Map
- Location of the airport in Guatemala

Runways
Direction	Length		Surface
Direction	m	ft	Surface
15/33	1,010	3,314	Asphalt
- Source: GCM Google Maps SkyVector

Zacapa Airport (ICAO: MGZA) is an airport serving the city of Zacapa, the capital municipality of Zacapa Department in Guatemala. The airport is on the southwest side of the city, alongside the Río Grande de Zacapa.

There is high terrain directly south of the airport.

== See also ==
- Transport in Guatemala
- List of airports in Guatemala
