= AQB =

AQB may refer to:

- Al-Quds Brigades, the armed wing of Palestinian Islamic Jihad
- AQB, the IATA code for Quiché Airport, Santa Cruz del Quiché, Guatemala
