= La Libertad Airport =

- IATA: none; ICAO: MGLL

Summary
- Airport type: Public
- Serves: La Libertad, Guatemala
- Elevation AMSL: 607 ft / 185 m
- Coordinates: 16°45′00″N 90°08′25″W

Map
- Location in Petén Department Location in Guatemala

Runways
Direction	Length		Surface
Direction	m	ft	Surface
04/22	1,170	3,839	Asphalt
- Source: Google Maps GCM

La Libertad Airport (ICAO: MGLL) is an airport serving the town of La Libertad in Petén Department, Guatemala. It is 4 kilometres (2.5 mi) southwest of the town.

The Tikal VOR-DME (Ident: TIK) is located 18.2 nautical miles (33.7 km) northeast of the airport.

== See also ==
- Transport in Guatemala
- List of airports in Guatemala
