= Cobán Airport =

Airport in Guatemala

Cobán Airport Aerodomo de Cobán
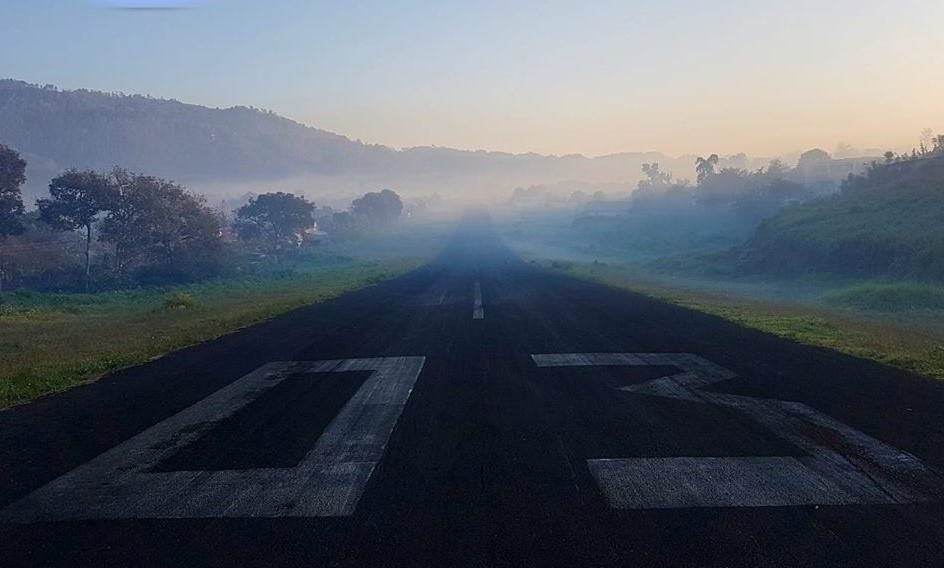
- IATA: CBV; ICAO: MGCB

Summary
- Airport type: Public
- Operator: Government
- Serves: Cobán, Guatemala
- Elevation AMSL: 4,339 ft / 1,323 m
- Coordinates: 15°28′10″N 90°24′25″W

Map
- Location in Alta Verapaz Department Location in Guatemala

Runways
Direction	Length		Surface
Direction	m	ft	Surface
03/21	955	3,133	Asphalt
- Source: WAD GCM

Cobán Airport (Spanish: Aerodomo de Cobán, IATA: CBV, ICAO: MGCB) is an airport serving Cobán, the capital of the Alta Verapaz Department of Guatemala. The airport is at the western edge of the city.

== See also ==
- Transport in Guatemala
- List of airports in Guatemala
