= Malacatán Airport =

- IATA: none; ICAO: MGML

Summary
- Airport type: Public
- Serves: Malacatán, Guatemala
- Elevation AMSL: 1,194 ft / 364 m
- Coordinates: 14°54′28″N 92°05′20″W

Map
- Location in San Marcos Department Location in Guatemala

Runways
Direction	Length		Surface
Direction	m	ft	Surface
10/29	940	3,084	Grass
- Source: Google Maps GCM

Malacatán Airport (ICAO: MGML) is an airport serving the town of Malacatán in the San Marcos Department of Guatemala.

The runway is in the countryside 2 kilometres (1.2 mi) west of the town. The Tapachula VOR-DME (Ident: TAP) is located 18.1 nautical miles (33.5 km) southwest of the airport.

== See also ==
- Transport in Guatemala
- List of airports in Guatemala
