= Esquipulas Airport =

- IATA: none; ICAO: MGES

Summary
- Airport type: Public
- Serves: Esquipulas, Guatemala
- Elevation AMSL: 3,114 ft (949 m)
- Coordinates: 14°34′05″N 89°19′30″W

Map
- Location in Chiquimula Department Location in Guatemala

Runways
Direction	Length		Surface
Direction	m	ft	Surface
07/25	1,020	3,346	Gravel
- Source: Google Maps GCM SkyVector

Esquipulas Airport (ICAO: MGES) is an airstrip serving the city of Esquipulas in Chiquimula Department, Guatemala.

The airstrip is 2 kilometres (1.2 mi) east of the city and 6 kilometres (4 mi) from the border with Honduras. There is rising terrain 1 kilometre (0.6 mi) south of the runway. In 2026, the aerodrome underwent improvements to its facilities, including work on interior partitions, ceilings and exterior walls.

== See also ==
- Transport in Guatemala
- List of airports in Guatemala
