= Carmelita =

Carmelita may refer to:

- Carmelita (baseball), a Cuban baseball team
- Carmelita (name), feminine given name in English and Spanish
- Carmelita (Pasadena, California), home and grove
- "Carmelita" (song), song by Warren Zevon from his 1976 self-titled album
- "Carmelita", song by Rick Recht from his 1999 album Tov
- Asociación Deportiva Carmelita, a Costa Rican football team
- Carmelita Airport, a small airport in Guatemala
- Carmelita, Belize, settlement in the Orange Walk District of Belize
- Carmelita, Petén, settlement in the municipality of San Andrés, Petén Department of Guatemala
- Carmelita Hinton (1890–1983), American progressive educator
- Carmelita Fox, fictional character in the Sly Cooper video games
- Carmelita Spats, character from the children's series A Series of Unfortunate Events
