= Río Dulce Airport =

Airport in Guatemala

Las Vegas Airport Río Dulce Airport
- IATA: LCF; ICAO: MGRD

Summary
- Airport type: Private
- Serves: Río Dulce, Guatemala
- Elevation AMSL: 66 ft / 20 m
- Coordinates: 15°40′05″N 88°57′40″W

Map
- Location in Izabal Department Location in Guatemala

Runways
Direction	Length		Surface
Direction	m	ft	Surface
12/30	1,000	3,281	Asphalt
- Source: GCM Google Maps

Las Vegas Airport (IATA: LCF, ICAO: MGRD) is an airport 4 kilometres (2.5 mi) east of Río Dulce, a village in Izabal Department, Guatemala.

The airport is on the east side of the Dulce River, which connects Lake Izabal and Lake El Golfete. No main roads connect the airport with the town, but it has good access from the river. West approach and departure are over the water.

The Puerto Barrios VOR-DME (Ident: IOS) is located 21.9 nautical miles (40.6 km) east of the airport.

The village and lakes are a popular vacation and retirement location.

== See also ==
- Transport in Guatemala
- List of airports in Guatemala
