= Quiché Airport =

Airport in Guatemala

- IATA: AQB; ICAO: MGQC

Summary
- Airport type: Public
- Serves: Santa Cruz del Quiché, Guatemala
- Elevation AMSL: 6,631 ft (2,021 m)
- Coordinates: 15°00′45″N 91°09′05″W

Map
- Location in Quiché Department Location in Guatemala

Runways
| Direction | Length | | Surface |
| Direction | m | ft | Surface |
|---|---|---|---|
| 17/35 | 1,245 | 4,085 | Asphalt |
- Source: GCM Google Maps

Quiché Airport (IATA: AQB, ICAO: MGQC) is an airport serving Santa Cruz del Quiché, the capital of Quiché Department, Guatemala. The airport is just south of the city.

The Rabinal VOR-DME is located 39.5 nautical miles (73.2 km) east of the airport.

== See also ==
- Transport in Guatemala
- List of airports in Guatemala
