= Manuel López (Guatemalan footballer) =

Guatemalan footballer (born 1990)

Personal information
- Full name: Manuel Estuardo López Rodas
- Date of birth: 26 April 1990 (age 36)
- Place of birth: Puerto Barrios, Guatemala
- Height: 1.79 m (5 ft 10 in)
- Position: Centre-back

Team information
- Current team: Marquense
- Number: 15

Senior career*
Years	Team	Apps	(Gls)
2014–2015	Malacateco	12	(1)
2016–2018	Guastatoya	50	(0)
2018–2022	Municipal	98	(1)
2022-2024	Cobán Imperial	56	(2)
2024-	Marquense	0	(0)

International career^{‡}
2019–	Guatemala	4	(0)
- * Club domestic league appearances and goals as of 05:04, 21 March 2022 (UTC) ‡ National team caps and goals as of 21:27, 12 July 2021 (UTC)

Manuel Estuardo López Rodas (born 26 April 1990) is a Guatemalan professional footballer who plays as a defender for Liga Guate club Marquense.

== Club career ==
López began his career with local Guatemalan side Sayaxche, before stints with Heredia, Malacateco, Deportivo Quiriguá, and Guastatoya, before signing with Municipal on 27 June 2018.

== International career ==
López debuted with the Guatemala national team in a 1–0 friendly win over Costa Rica on 23 March 2019. He was called up to represent Guatemala at the 2021 CONCACAF Gold Cup.

== Honours ==
Guastatoya

- Liga Nacional de Guatemala: Clausura 2018

Municipal

- Liga Nacional de Guatemala: Apertura 2019

Cobán Imperial

- Liga Nacional de Guatemala: Apertura 2022
