= Carmelita Airport =

Airport in Maya Biosphere Reserve, Guatemala

- IATA: CMM; ICAO: MGCR

Summary
- Airport type: Public
- Serves: Carmelita, Guatemala
- Location: Maya Biosphere Reserve
- Elevation AMSL: 753 ft / 230 m
- Coordinates: 17°27′45″N 90°03′10″W

Map
- Location in Petén Department Location in Guatemala

Runways
Direction	Length		Surface
Direction	m	ft	Surface
06/24	640	2,100	Grass
- Source: GCM Bing Maps

Carmelita Airport (IATA: CMM, ICAO: MGCR) is an airstrip serving Carmelita, a small community in the Maya Biosphere Reserve of Guatemala. A section of the runway also serves as a street in the village.

Google Earth Historical Imagery (3/18/2015) shows trees that formerly impinged the runway in a previous image (12/9/2012) have been removed.

The Tikal VOR-DME (Ident: TIK) is located 34.1 nautical miles (63.2 km) south-southeast of the airstrip.

== See also ==
- Transport in Guatemala
- List of airports in Guatemala
