= Cyprus Tennis Federation =

Sports governing body in Cyprus

Cyprus Tennis Federation Oμοσπονδία Αντισφαίρισης Κύπρου
- Abbreviation: CTF (ΟΑΚ)
- Formation: 1951
- Headquarters: Nicosia
- Location: Cyprus
- Members: 9,220
- Website: CyprusTennis.com

The Cyprus Tennis Federation (CTF) (Greek: Ομοσπονδία Αντισφαίρισης Κύπρου, ΟΑΚ) is the governing body for the game of tennis in Cyprus. It was founded in 1951. Since 1984 it has been organising Cyprus’ participation in the Davis Cup.

It is a full member of the International Tennis Federation (ITF) and Tennis Europe (TE).
