= Poptún =

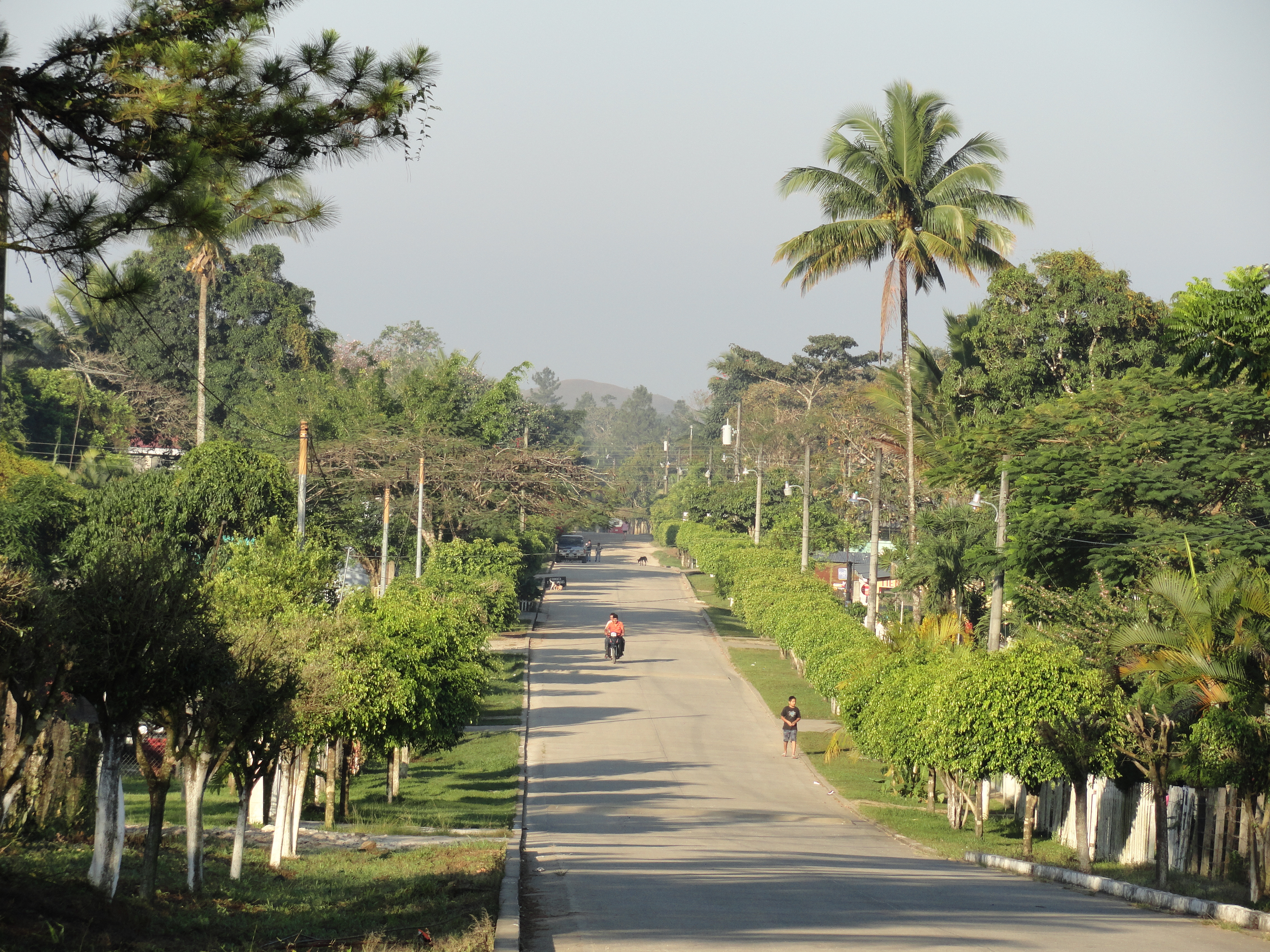

- Location in Guatemala
- Coordinates: 16°19′20″N 89°25′20″W
- Country: Guatemala
- Department: El Petén

Government
  - Mayor: José Obdulio Pinto Vides (UNE)

Population (2018)
  - Total: 69,437
- Climate: Am

Poptún is a municipality in the El Petén department of Guatemala. It covers an area of 1,128 km^{2}, and had a population of 35,663 at the 2002 Census; the latest official estimate (as at mid-2012) was 64,988. It is some 385 km from Guatemala City. Since 1989, Military Zone 23 in Poptún has been the home of the Guatemalan Army's elite Kaibiles special operations force.

== Geographic location ==
Poptún is in the southeast part of Petén Department and communicates with the rest of the Republic of Guatemala via a 100-km highway to Flores.
