= Puerto Barrios =

- Municipality
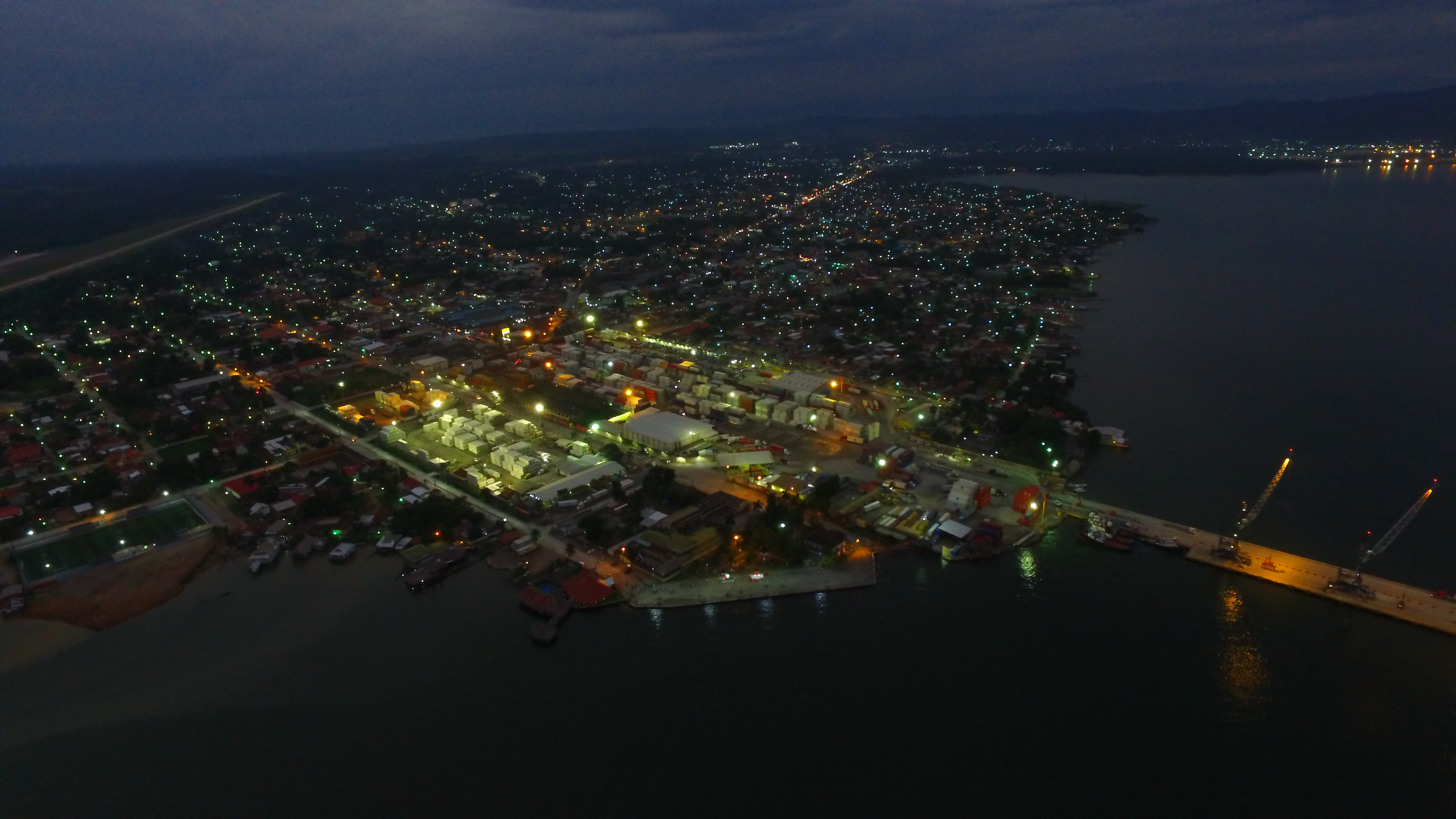
- Puerto Barrios at night

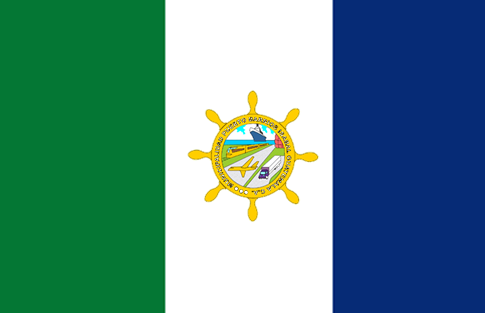
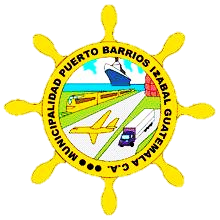
- Flag Seal

- Location in Guatemala
- Coordinates: 15°42′47.7″N 88°35′23.6″W
- Country: Guatemala
- Department: Izabal

Government
  - Mayor: Hugo Sarceño

Area
  - Municipality: 1,190 km^{2} (460 sq mi)
- Elevation: 638 m (2,093 ft)
- Highest elevation: 1,276 m (4,186 ft)
- Lowest elevation: 0 m (0 ft)

Population (2018)
  - Municipality: 100,593
  - Density: 84.5/km^{2} (219/sq mi)
  - Urban: 100,593
- Climate: Af

Puerto Barrios (Spanish pronunciation: [ˈpweɾ.to ˈβa.rjos]) is a city in Guatemala, located within the Gulf of Honduras. The city is located on Bahia de Amatique. Puerto Barrios is the departmental seat of Izabal department and is the administrative seat of Puerto Barrios municipality.

It is Guatemala's main Caribbean Sea port, together with its more modern twin port town just to the southwest, Santo Tomás de Castilla. As of the 2018 census, the population of Puerto Barrios was 100,593. Puerto Barrios is located 297 kilometers (185 mi) northeast of Guatemala City. It is the terminus of Highway CA9 which begins at the Pacific port city of Puerto San José and traverses the country through Guatemala City.

The city's population is a mix of mostly Garifuna, Maya, Afro-Caribbean (such as Afro-Jamaicans), and other West Indian groups. Its heyday was in the latter 19th and early 20th centuries, following the construction of a railroad connecting large banana and coffee plantations with the shipping docks, all controlled by the International Railways of Central America and The Great White Fleet, both owned by the United Fruit Company.

Puerto Barrios is divided into many neighborhoods or Barrios such as El Rastro, Las Champas, Los Tanques, La Veinte, La Veintedos, La Catorce, La Trece, and El Estrecho. Although the town is small, due to its harbor nature, many of its visitors are ship workers who frequent the night entertainment centers throughout the town.

Puerto Barrios is starting to get more visitors in the new century as the nearby town of Santo Tomás de Castilla has started receiving cruise ships. Puerto Barrios Airport was refurbished and receives scheduled flights.

Among the many nearby tourist attractions are the Mayan ruins of Quirigua. In 1910, the United Fruit Company bought Quiriguá and all the land around the site for banana production; they set aside 75 acres or 30 hectares around the ceremonial center as an archaeological park, leaving an island of jungle among the plantations. Nearby the Quirigua ruins is the Quirigua Hospital, established by United Fruit Company in 1910, and considered the finest tropical hospital in the America's at the time of its operation. On the grounds of the hospital is the Quirigua Hospital Cemetery, where some of the UFC and hospital workers that died in Guatemala are interred. The Castillo de San Felipe de Lara, an old Spanish fort in Río Dulce, guards the entrance to Lake Izabal. Another popular attraction is the lively town of Livingston where Garifuna culture can be experienced, with its Punta and Yankunu dances.

== History ==
Interoceanic railways sections and stations built during general José María Reina Barrios tenure. The Panajax -Guatemala City section could not be built due to the steep mountain terrain and the lack of funds after the Guatemalan economy crashed in early 1897.

In 1883, then president general Justo Rufino Barrios had the plan to connect Guatemala City to a port on the Atlantic shore through a railroad in order to be able to move the coffee produced by his own haciendas and those of his liberal partners. On 4 August 1883, he issued a decree in which a person with a salary of more than 4 pesos a month could pay 4 pesos a year over a 10-year span to finance the railroad. However, after the death of Barrios in the Battle of Chalchuapa in 1885, this plan was forgotten by his successor, general Manuel Lisandro Barillas.

It was not until 1892, when José María Reina Barrios assumed power, that the railroad project was restarted. On 19 July 1895, Reina Barrios issued executive action No. 513, which established that a city was to be founded between the Escondido and Estrecho rivers, to be called Puerto Barrios. The ceremonial act of foundation took place on 5 December 1892. A part of the Northern Railroad project, executive action No. 524 declared Puerto Barrios to be a "Major port of the Republic" and ordered the customs offices previously based in Livingston to be relocated there.

The Exposición Centroamericana (Central American Expo) was an industrial and cultural exposition that was to take place in Guatemala in 1897 and which was approved on 8 March 1894 by the National Assembly by Decree 253 by a suggestion made by president Reina Barrios. Given that in those days most visitors arriving from Europe and North America would arrive at the port on the Caribbean Sea shore, Reina Barrios pushed for the Northern Railroad to be finished quickly. Not only was the railroad vital for the Expo success, it was key to move merchandise and passengers between the Caribbean Sea and the new Port of Iztapa on the Pacific shore. Reina Barrios hoped the railroad would improve the progress and development of the country given that the United States and Spain were still at war over Cuba, and it was evident that a dependable inter-oceanic communication line was crucial for the North American country. Completing a transoceanic railway was a main objective of Reina Barrios' government, with a goal to attract international investors at a time when the Panama Canal was not built yet. However, a sharp decline in the price of coffee and silver, along with the high technical difficulties of the railroad construction close to Guatemala City – mainly due to the steep cliffs and mountains around the city− resulted in the collapse of Guatemala's economy, and the eventual assassination of Reina Barrios, on 8 February 1898.

After Reina Barrios' death, civilian lawyer Manuel Estrada Cabrera was designated as president and inherited an enormous external debt to British banks, which forced him to search for an ally in the United States. In 1900, Estrada Cabrera authorized his Secretary of Economy, Rafael Spínola, to contract an American company, Central American Improvement Co. Inc., to finish the Northern Railroad and fix those stretches that were in disrepair on the rest of the line. To cover the expenses, the Guatemalan government gave a concession to the American company to use the railroad along with all of its facilities without any cost; this included the port and dock in Puerto Barrios, for which the Guatemalan people and government had to pay fees for their use.

Finally, in 1904, knowing the pro-American attitude of Estrada Cabrera, Minor Keith's partners, (Note: Keith owned United Fruit Company and had already built several railroads in Central America.) began to get concession on railroads of both Guatemala and El Salvador, and in that year, International Railways of Central American (IRCA) was incorporated in New Jersey.; the harbor was then partly built by Theodore Roosevelt's Corps of Engineers in 1906-1908. Eventually, United Fruit Company, owner of IRCA, controlled Puerto Barrios completely, as it owned the docks, the railroads, the banana production from Izabal and even the merchant fleet: the Great White Fleet.

This situation remained as such until the government of Colonel Jacobo Árbenz Guzmán (1951-1954), who decided to build a highway and another port – Santo Tomas de Castilla – to compete with the American fruit company. He also issued an Agrarian Reform that impacted UFCO land. Eventually, Árbenz was accused of Communism and was ousted in 1954, but the highway was almost completed and was completed by his successor, colonel Carlos Castillo Armas. Just as Arbenz had hoped, IRCA's last profit was reported in 1957.

The earthquake on 4 February 1976, one of the worst in Guatemala's history, destroyed most of the port facilities of Puerto Barrios, and most modern cargo traffic moved to its twin port in Santo Tomás de Castilla. In the 21st century, Puerto Barrios remains an important hub for Dole and Fresh Del Monte Produce industries in addition to Chiquita, United Fruit Company's successor.

== Geographic location ==
The municipality's elevation varies from sea level at Punta de Manabique to 1,276 metres or 4,186 feet above sea level at Cerro San Gil. The municipal capital is located on the shore of Santo Tomás internal bay, which is part of Amatique Bay. There is a small peninsula called Punta de Manabique which separates the small bay from the Gulf of Honduras, and shelters it from storms.

== Climate ==
Puerto Barrios has a trade-wind tropical rainforest climate (Köppen: Af). The city experiences significant rainfall year-round. Like most cities and towns with this climate, Puerto Barrios does not have a dry season. The average annual temperature in Puerto Barrios is 27.3 °C or 81.1 °F. About 2,748 millimetres or 108.2 inches of rain falls annually over the course of the year.

Climate data for Puerto Barrios (Puerto Barrios Airport) (1991–2020)
Month	Jan	Feb	Mar	Apr	May	Jun	Jul	Aug	Sep	Oct	Nov	Dec	Year
Record high °C (°F)	36.0 (96.8)	36.0 (96.8)	39.0 (102.2)	40.4 (104.7)	41.0 (105.8)	39.0 (102.2)	36.4 (97.5)	36.4 (97.5)	36.4 (97.5)	37.8 (100.0)	35.2 (95.4)	35.0 (95.0)	41.0 (105.8)
Mean daily maximum °C (°F)	27.4 (81.3)	28.6 (83.5)	30.0 (86.0)	31.6 (88.9)	32.1 (89.8)	32.1 (89.8)	31.4 (88.5)	31.6 (88.9)	31.8 (89.2)	30.6 (87.1)	28.6 (83.5)	27.6 (81.7)	30.3 (86.5)
Daily mean °C (°F)	23.7 (74.7)	24.7 (76.5)	25.8 (78.4)	27.7 (81.9)	28.4 (83.1)	28.6 (83.5)	28.0 (82.4)	28.1 (82.6)	28.1 (82.6)	27.0 (80.6)	25.0 (77.0)	24.1 (75.4)	26.6 (79.9)
Mean daily minimum °C (°F)	20.2 (68.4)	20.6 (69.1)	21.1 (70.0)	22.3 (72.1)	23.0 (73.4)	23.3 (73.9)	22.9 (73.2)	23.0 (73.4)	23.0 (73.4)	22.6 (72.7)	21.4 (70.5)	20.6 (69.1)	22.0 (71.6)
Record low °C (°F)	14.7 (58.5)	15.1 (59.2)	15.1 (59.2)	16.4 (61.5)	17.5 (63.5)	19.8 (67.6)	20.2 (68.4)	19.5 (67.1)	18.4 (65.1)	19.2 (66.6)	16.9 (62.4)	15.4 (59.7)	14.7 (58.5)
Average precipitation mm (inches)	294.6 (11.60)	185.5 (7.30)	160.8 (6.33)	139.3 (5.48)	207.6 (8.17)	248.7 (9.79)	408.7 (16.09)	384.7 (15.15)	325.2 (12.80)	371.8 (14.64)	404.9 (15.94)	269.5 (10.61)	3,401.3 (133.91)
Average precipitation days (≥ 1.0 mm)	14.7	12.5	10.6	7.9	11.9	15.9	22.0	20.5	16.8	16.7	17.1	16.5	183.1
Source: NOAA

== Transport ==
=== Construction of Atlantic Highway and Santo Tomas de Castilla Harbor ===
Map of railway lines in Guatemala and El Salvador, which were owned by the IRCA, the subsidiary of the United Fruit Company that controlled the railroad in both countries, while the only Atlantic port was controlled by the Great White Fleet, also a UFCO company.

In order to establish the necessary physical infrastructure to make possible the "independent" and national capitalist development that could reduce the extreme dependence on the United States and break the American monopolies operating in the country, president Jacobo Árbenz and his government began the planning and construction of the Atlantic Highway, which was intended to compete with the monopoly on land transport exerted by the United Fruit Company, through one of its subsidiaries: the International Railways of Central America (IRCA), which had the concession since 1904, when it was granted by then president Manuel Estrada Cabrera. Construction of the highway began by the Roads Department of the Ministry of Communications, with the help of the military engineering battalion. It was planned to be built parallel along the railway line, as much as possible. The construction of the new port was also aimed to break another UFCO monopoly, since Puerto Barrios was owned and operated solely by The Great White Fleet, another UFCO subsidiary.

== In films ==
=== The New Adventures of Tarzan (1935) ===
Film locations for The New Adventures of Tarzan.

In 1935, the film The New Adventures of Tarzan, was filmed on location in Guatemala, taking advantage of the help from the United Fruit Company and president Jorge Ubico. The places where the filming was made were:

- Chichicastenango: scenes of a native town where the explorers first met.
- Antigua Guatemala: The Green Goddess temple
- Río Dulce
- Puerto Barrios: arrival and departure of the boats carrying the explorers
- Tikal: jungle scenes
- Quiriguá: Mayan city where they get lectured on the maya civilization
- Guatemala City: then luxurious Palace Hotel was used to shoot the scenes of the hotel in the imaginary town of At Mantique

== Government and infrastructure ==
There is a prison in the city with an official capacity of 175 prisoners. As of 2016, it has over 900 prisoners, making it over capacity.

== Torre Manatí ==
In 2018, Desarrollos Inmobiliarios Izabal, S.A. a development company in Guatemala commissioned Guatemalan architecture firm, Studio Domus, to develop a 15 million dollar development project consisting of a 37-story skyscraper and yacht club in Puerto Barrios. Developers broke ground in May 2019 and construction is expected to conclude in January 2021.

When completed, Torre Manatí will be the tallest skyscraper in Central America.

== Famous People from Puerto Barrios ==
- David Campos, elected to the San Francisco Board of Supervisors in November 2008
- Manuel López, professional footballer
- Freddy Thompson, Soccer Player
- David M Stokes, Soccer Player, 1968 Olympics
- Alba Elvira Lorenzana, wife of media magnate Remigio Ángel González

== See also ==
- Mundo Maya International Airport
- United Fruit Company

== Notes and references ==
=== Bibliography ===
- Buchenau, J. (1996). In the Shadow of the Giant, the Making of Mexico's Central America Policy (1876–1930) (Vintage ed.). University of Alabama Press. ISBN 0-8173-0829-6.
- Estrada Paniagua, Felipe (1908). Recopilación de las leyes de la República de Guatemala (15 de marzo de 1900 a 15 de marzo de 1901) (in Spanish). Vol. XIX. Guatemala: Arturo Síguere y Cía.
