= La Aurora International Airport =

Airport serving Guatemala City, Guatemala

La Aurora International Airport Aeropuerto Internacional La Aurora
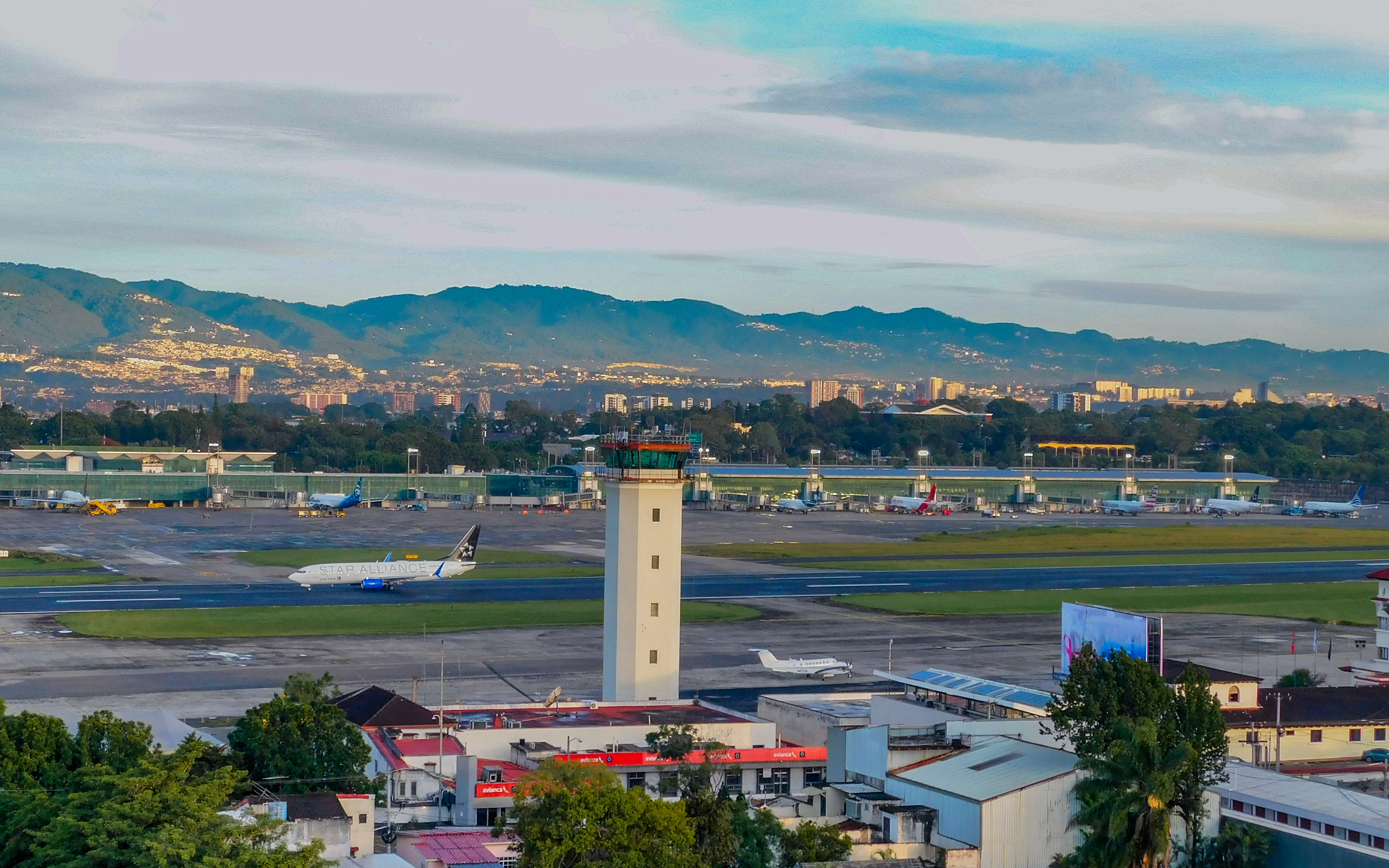
- IATA: GUA; ICAO: MGGT

Summary
- Airport type: Public / Military
- Owner: Ministry of Communications, Infrastructure, and Housing
- Operator: General Directorate of Civil Aeronautics
- Serves: Guatemala City, Guatemala
- Hub for: Avianca Guatemala; DHL de Guatemala; Transportes Aereos Guatemaltecos
- Elevation AMSL: 1,509 m (4,951 ft)
- Coordinates: 14°34′54″N 90°31′36″W

Map
- Location in Guatemala Department Location in Guatemala

Runways
Direction	Length		Surface
Direction	m	ft	Surface
02/20	2,987	9,800	Asphalt

Statistics (2024)
- Total passengers: 4,919,850
- Ranking: 1st
- Employees: 250
- Source: Guatemalan AIP

La Aurora International Airport (IATA: GUA, ICAO: MGGT) serves Guatemala City, the capital of Guatemala. It is located 6.4 kilometres (4.0 mi; 3.5 nmi) south of Guatemala City's center and 25 km (16 mi; 13 nmi) from Antigua Guatemala. It is administered by the General Directorate of Civil Aeronautics.

The airport is the fourth-busiest in Central America in terms of passenger traffic behind Tocumen International Airport in Panamá, Juan Santamaría International Airport in Costa Rica, and the El Salvador International Airport.

== Overview ==
The airport's runway currently measures 2,987 m × 60 m (9,800 ft × 197 ft).

La Aurora International Airport has two exclusive VIP lounges: Los Añejos Business Lounge and Copa Club, a VIP lounge for passengers traveling on Copa Airlines and United Airlines.

The head office of the General Directorate of Civil Aeronautics is located in the airport Zone 13.

== History ==
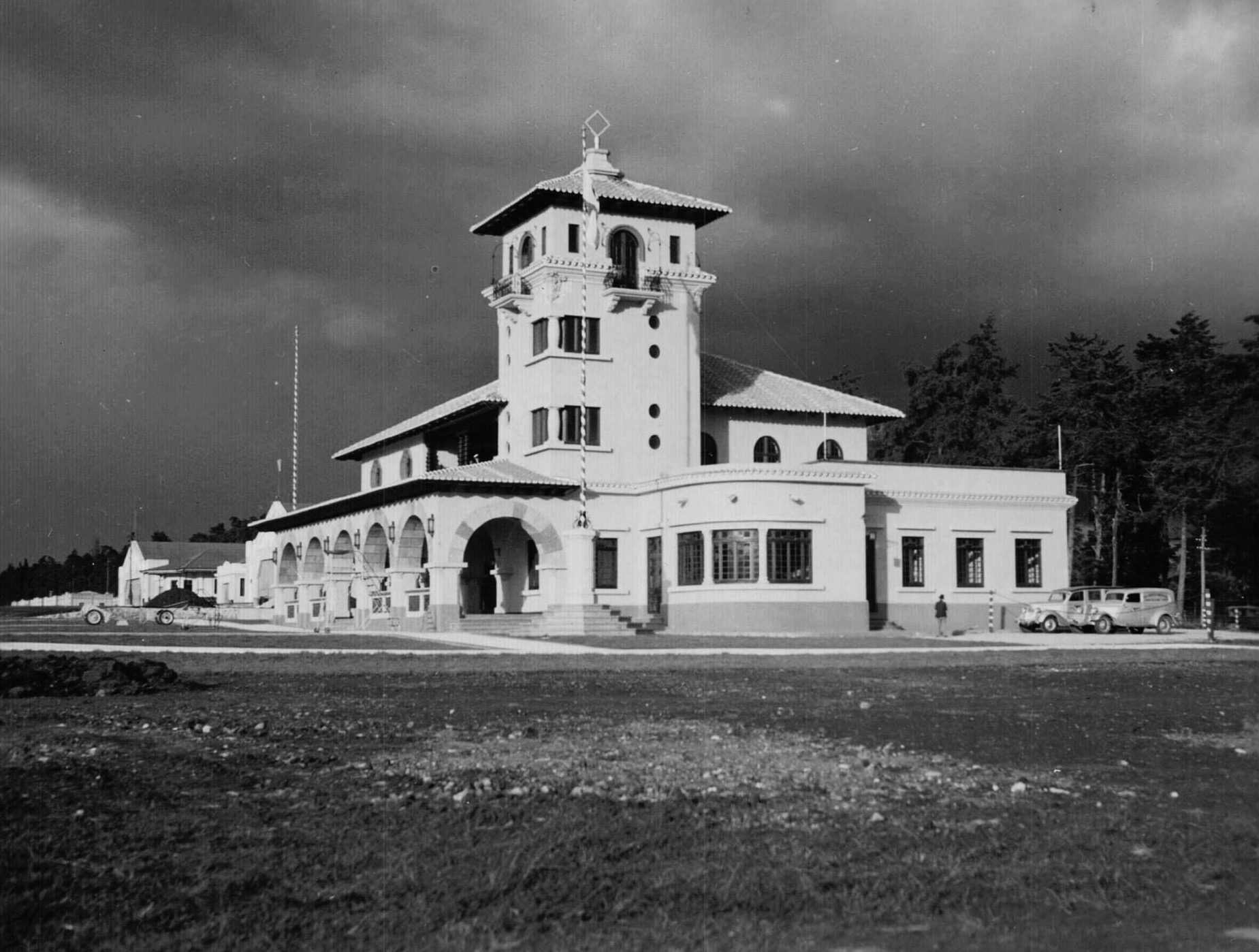
Original airport building, c. 1940

In October 2004, Iberia introduced nonstop service to Madrid aboard Airbus A340s. The route resulted from the airline's decision to shut down its Miami hub, where passengers previously had to change planes.

The airport was closed for six months in 2020, from March to September, in response to the COVID-19 pandemic.

== Airlines and destinations ==
=== Passenger ===
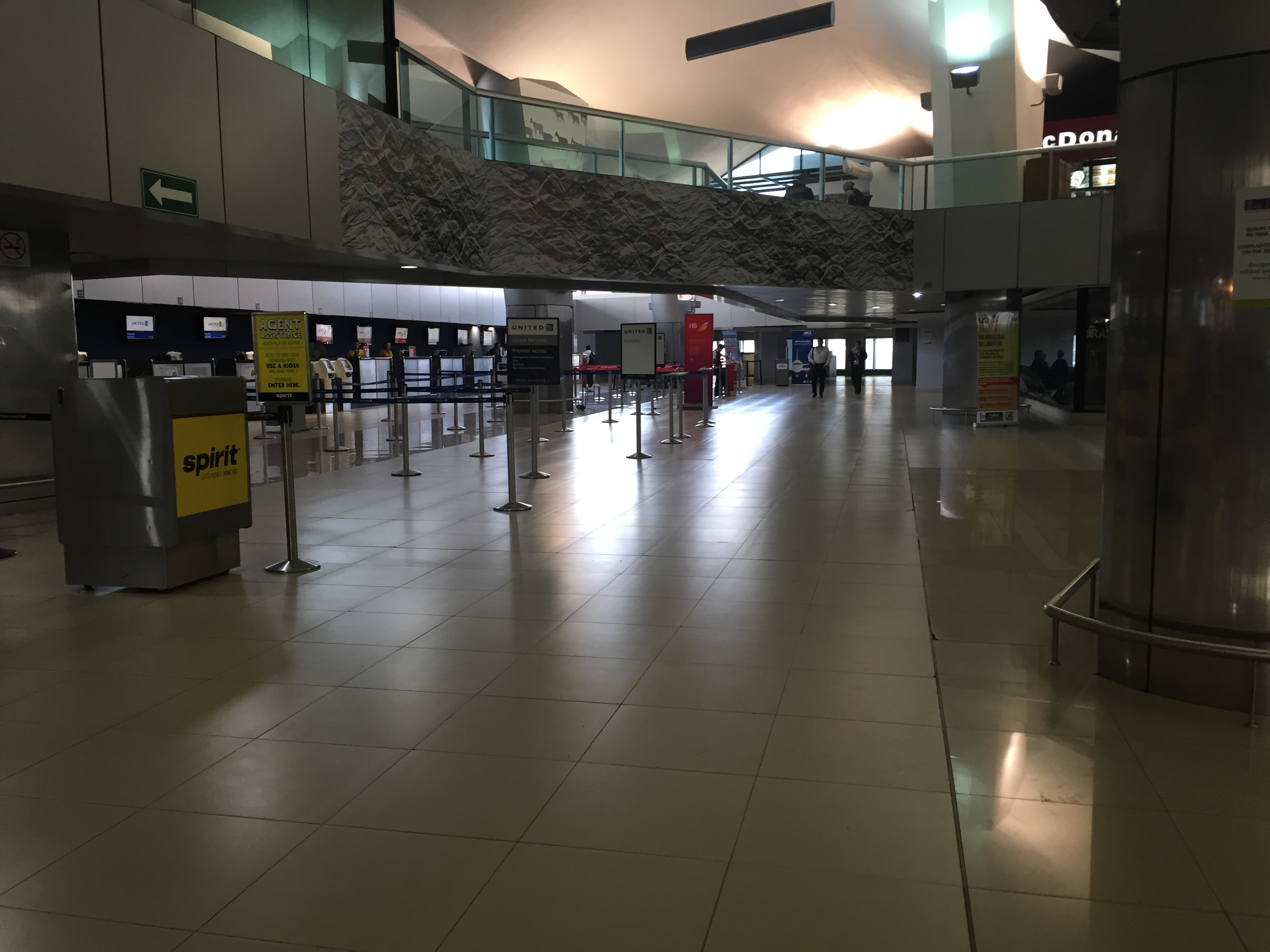
Check-in counters

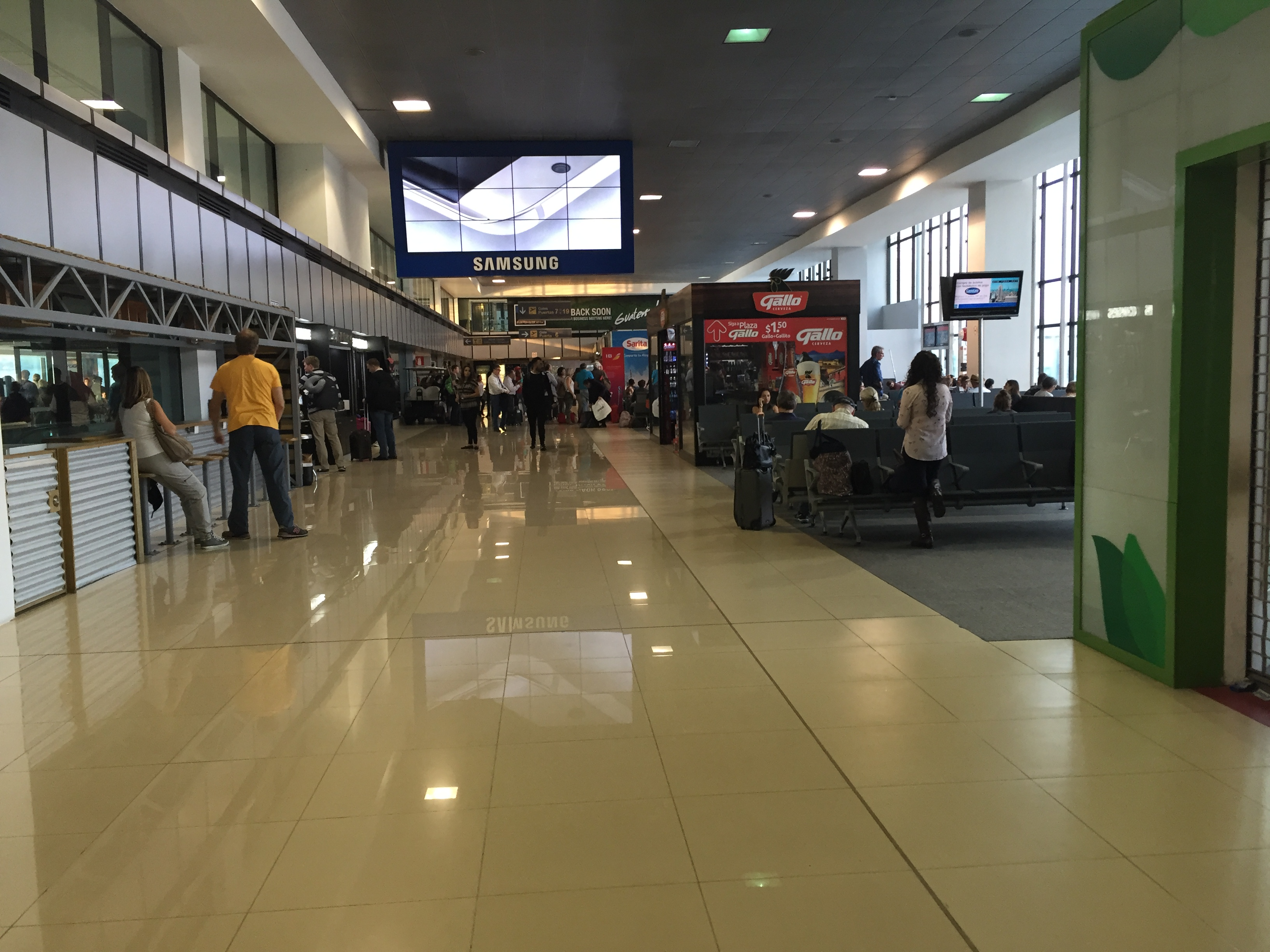
Main corridor

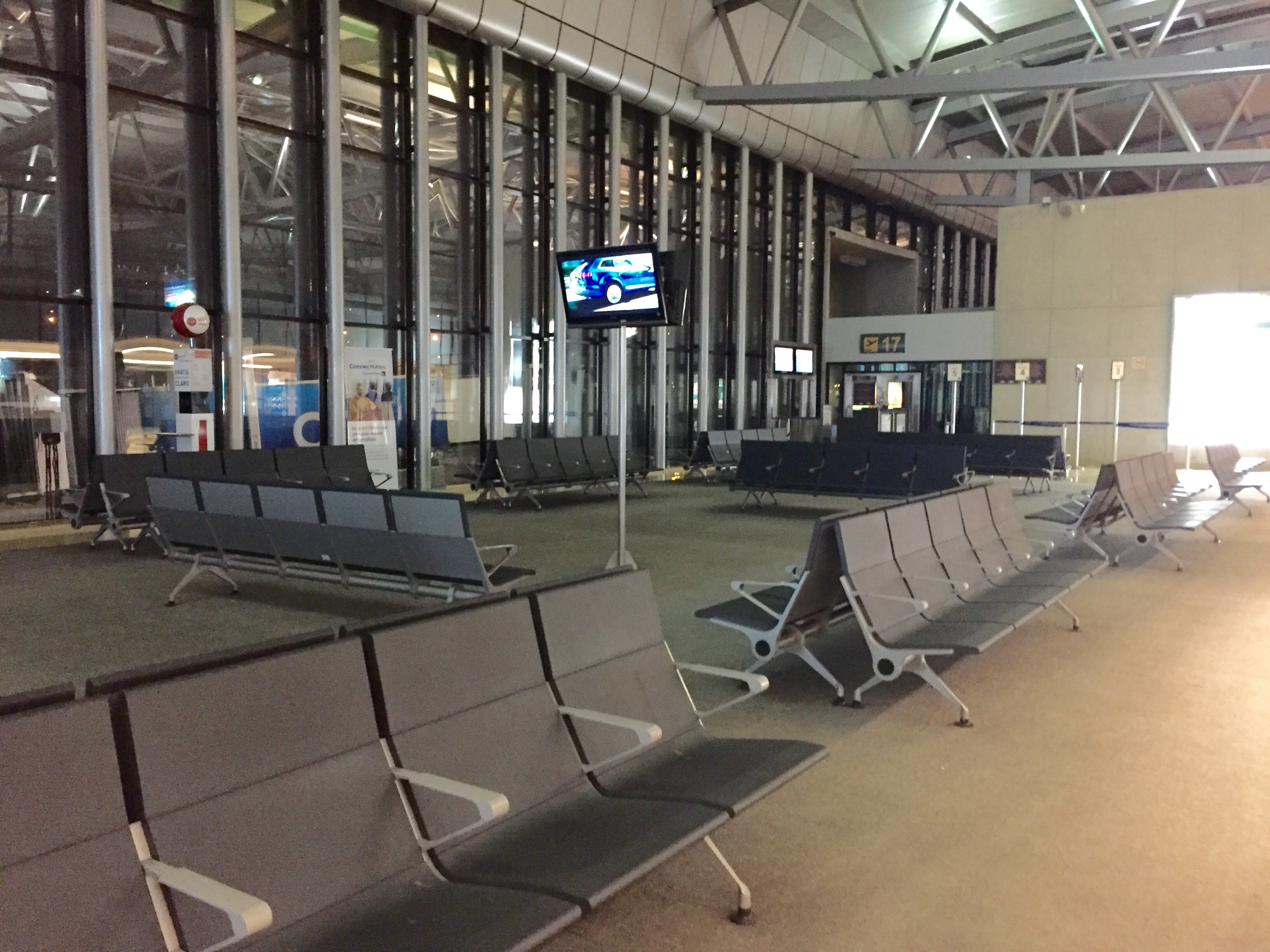
Waiting room

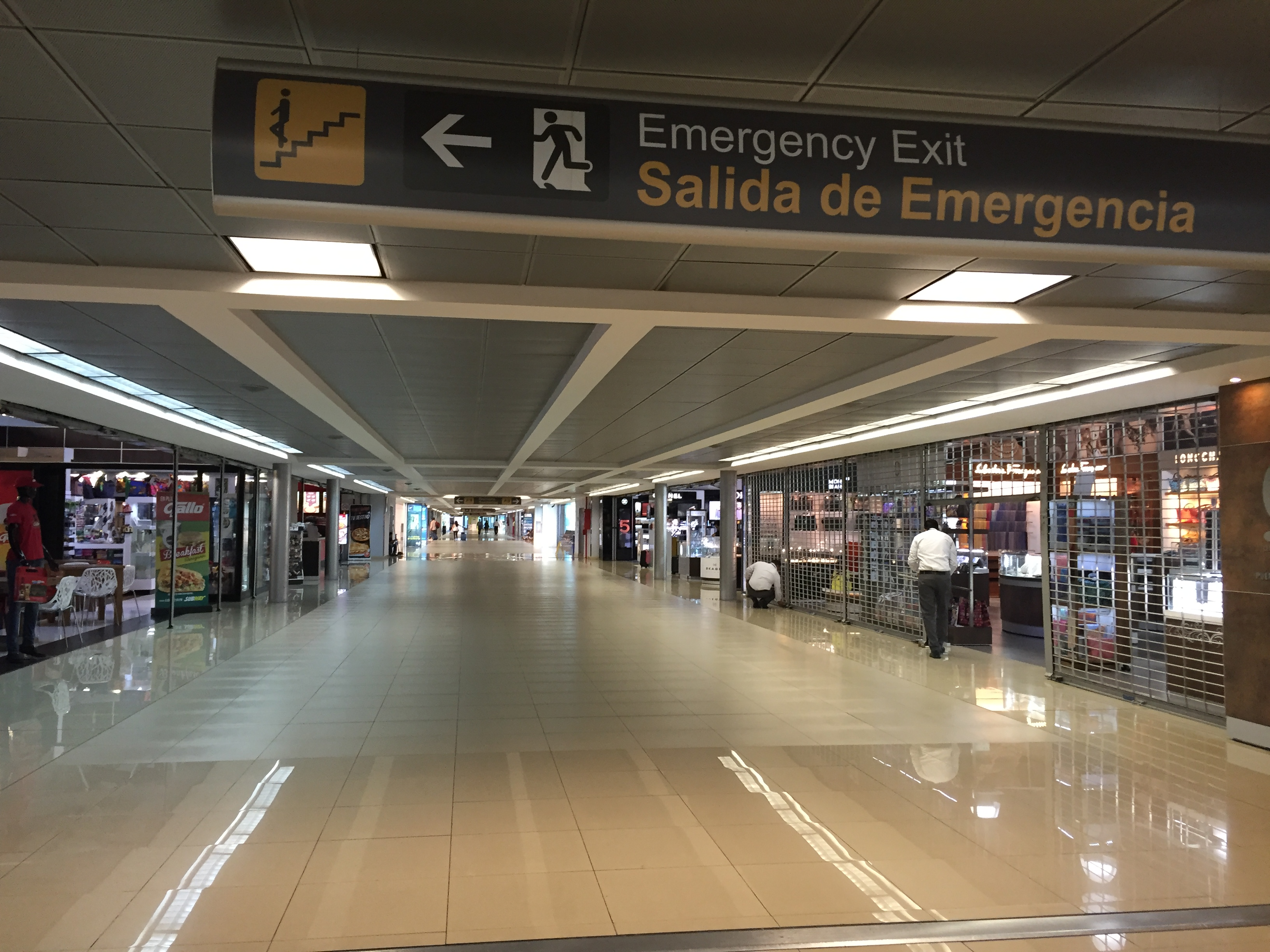
Main corridor

Airlines	Destinations
Aeroméxico	Mexico City–Benito Juárez
Air Canada	Montréal–Trudeau, Toronto–Pearson (begins December 1, 2026)
Alaska Airlines	Los Angeles
American Airlines	Dallas/Fort Worth, Miami; Seasonal: Chicago–O'Hare
Arajet	Santo Domingo–Las Américas
Avianca	Bogotá
Avianca Costa Rica	Los Angeles, New York–JFK; Seasonal: Chicago–O'Hare
Avianca El Salvador	Seasonal: Los Angeles, San Francisco
BermudAir	Seasonal: Belize City, Boston (both begin December 19, 2026)
Delta Air Lines	Atlanta
Frontier Airlines	Seasonal: Atlanta, Dallas/Fort Worth, Houston–Intercontinental, Orlando
JetBlue	Fort Lauderdale
United Airlines	Chicago–O'Hare, Houston–Intercontinental, Los Angeles, Newark; Seasonal: Washington–Dulles
Volaris	Cancún, Guadalajara (begins December 4, 2026), Mexico City–Benito Juárez
Wingo	Bogotá, Medellín–JMC

== Statistics ==
=== Passengers ===
Busiest routes from La Aurora International Airport (2024)
Rank	Airport	Passengers	Airlines
1	Los Angeles, California	501,486	Alaska Airlines, Avianca El Salvador, Delta Air Lines, United Airlines, Volaris Costa Rica
2	San José, Costa Rica	441,644	Avianca Costa Rica, Copa Airlines, Volaris Costa Rica
3	Panama City–Tocumen, Panama	416,332	Copa Airlines
4	Mexico City–Benito Juárez, Mexico	413,213	Aeroméxico, Aeroméxico Connect, Volaris Costa Rica, Volaris
5	San Salvador, El Salvador	368,894	Avianca El Salvador, Avianca Guatemala, TAG Airlines, Volaris El Salvador
6	Houston–Intercontinental, Texas	361,082	Spirit Airlines, United Airlines
7	Miami, Florida	357,686	American Airlines, Frontier Airlines
8	Flores, Petén	350,797	Avianca Guatemala, TAG Airlines
9	New York–JFK, New York	186,030	Avianca El Salvador, JetBlue
10	Fort Lauderdale, Florida	185,889	Spirit Airlines

== Accidents and incidents ==
- On 1 March 1980, a Douglas C-47 of the Fuerza Aérea Guatemalteca was damaged beyond repair near La Aurora.
- On 6 April 1993, TACA Airlines Flight 510, a Boeing 767, ran off the end of Runway 19 (now Runway 20) after landing. A passenger on board filmed the landing, which showed a runway with standing water from a tropical storm which had just passed over. A great amount of runway had passed under the plane before touchdown and the pilot forced the landing. In spite of thrust reversers used, the plane could not slow down in time, began to shudder from excessive wheel-braking, the captain made a last second decision to steer the airplane to the left of the runway (avoiding a big ditch at the end of the runway), went down an embankment and stopped into some structures. Surprisingly, there were no fatalities and the only injured people were three non-passengers. The aircraft was written off.
- On 28 April 1995, Faucett Flight 705, a Douglas DC-8 leased by Million Air, overshot the runway and crashed into several houses. All three crew members onboard survived, but six people on the ground were killed.
- On 21 December 1999, Cubana de Aviación Flight 1216, a McDonnell Douglas DC-10-30 (leased to Cubana by AOM French Airlines) overshot runway 19 during landing and crashed into a residential area. 16 of the 314 people on board were killed, along with two people on the ground.
