= Transportes Aéreos Guatemaltecos =

Guatemalan airline

Transportes Aéreos Guatemaltecos, S.A. (TAG)
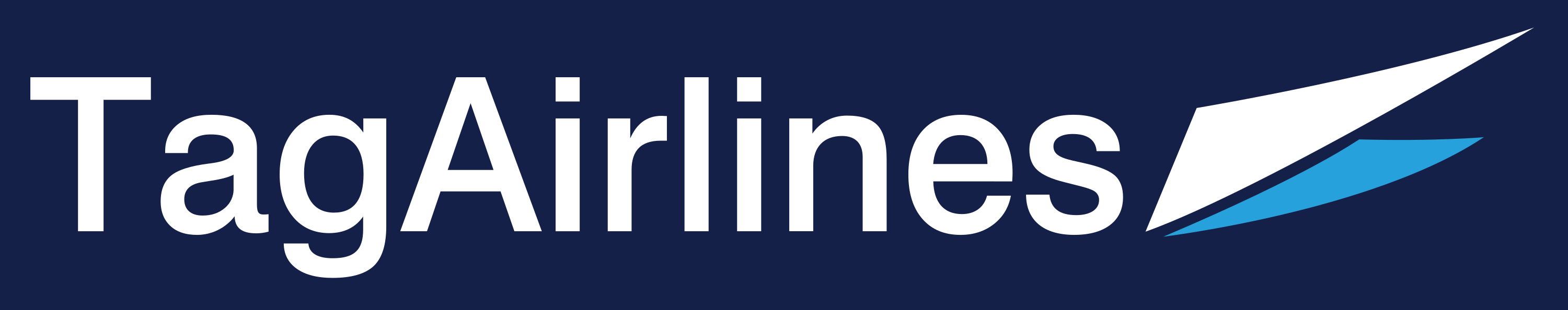

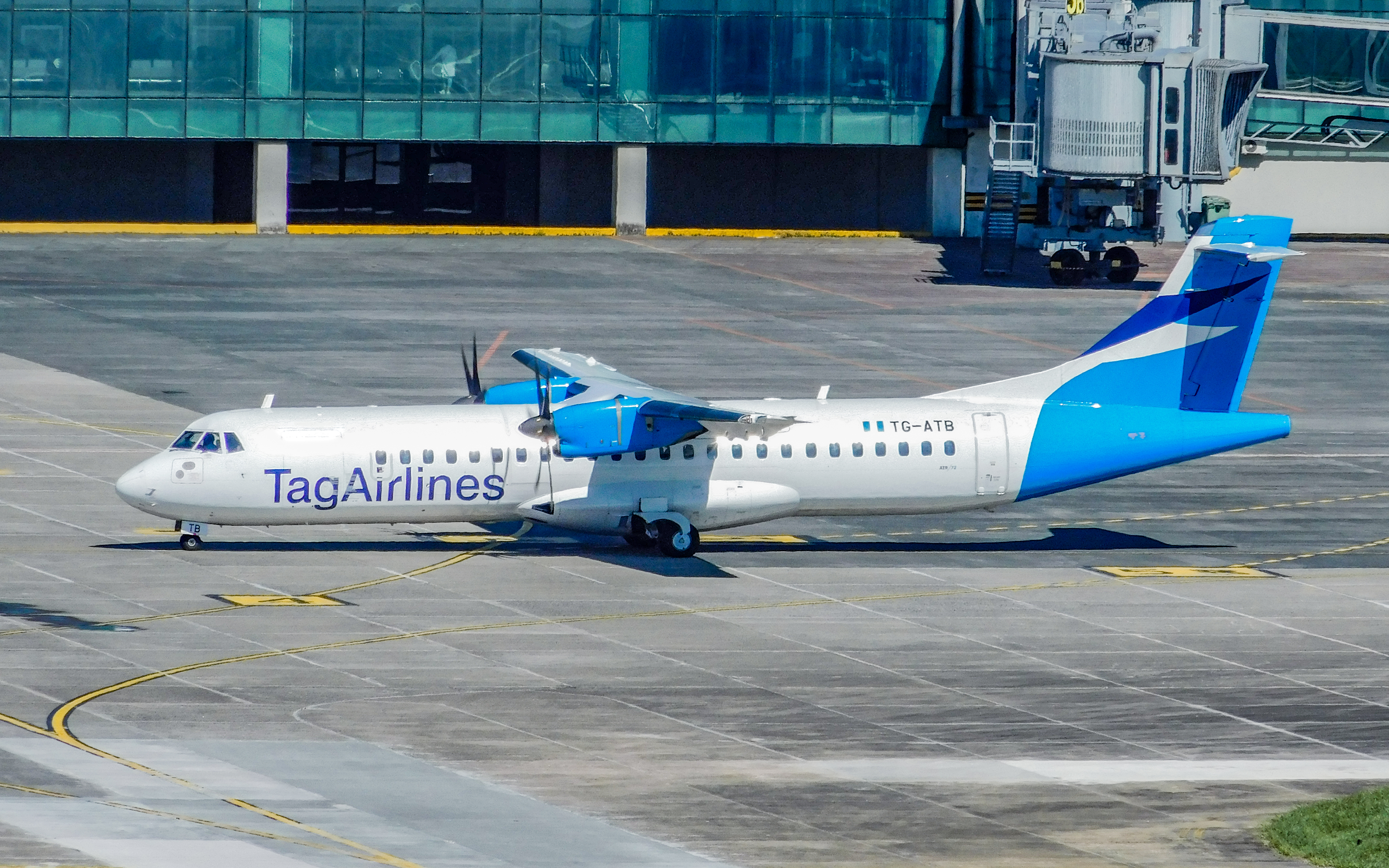
- TAG ATR 72-212A
IATA	ICAO	Call sign
5U	TGU	Tango Golf Uniform
- Founded: 1969; 57 years ago
- Hubs: La Aurora Int'l Airport
- Focus cities: Mundo Maya Int'l Airport
- Fleet size: 5
- Destinations: 13
- Headquarters: Guatemala City, Guatemala
- Employees: 400
- Website: tagairlines.com/es-gt/

Transportes Aéreos Guatemaltecos (TAG) is a private passenger and cargo airline with its headquarters in Zone 13 of Guatemala City, and with its main hub at La Aurora International Airport. It was founded in 1969 in Guatemala City. It currently has a fleet of 5 aircraft.

TAG has around 400 employees and operates a maintenance facility at La Aurora International Airport. The hangars are located opposite to the main terminal building, on the east side of the airport. It operates regular flights between the capital and Mundo Maya International Airport in Flores and offers charters, ambulance flights and agricultural flights, both domestic and to Belize, El Salvador, Honduras, and Mexico.

TAG is the first airline in Guatemala to be certified by the ICAO.

== Scheduled destinations ==
- Guatemala City, Guatemala
- Flores, Guatemala
- Puerto Barrios, Guatemala
- Belize City, Belize
- San Salvador, El Salvador
- Cancún, Mexico
- Roatán, Honduras
- San Pedro Sula, Honduras
- Tapachula, Mexico
- Merida Yucatán, Mexico

=== Charter destinations ===
- Puerto Barrios Airport, Quetzaltenango Airport, Retalhuleu/Xetulul, Zacapa, Chiquimula, Antigua Guatemala (helicopters), Panajachel (helicopters)
- Copán, Roatán, Utila, Belize and other Central American destinations
- Cancún, Chetumal, Mexico City,

All charter flights operate depending on demand.

=== Interline Agreements ===
- Iberia

== Fleet ==
=== Current fleet ===
As of July 2026, Transportes Aéreos Guatemaltecos operates the following aircraft:

TAG fleet
Aircraft	In service	Orders	Notes
Embraer 145LR	1	—	
ATR 72-500	4	—	
Total	5	—	

=== Former fleet ===
As of August 2025, Transportes Aéreos Guatemaltecos operated 4 ATR 72-500 and 1 Embraer ERJ 145

In 1972, the airline added a Douglas DC-3 to its fleet, competing with the state-owned Aviateca.

- 1 BAe Jetstream 31 TG-TAK
- 3 Let L-410 TG-TAG, TG-TAY, TG-TAJ
- 1 Embraer 110 TG-TAN, TG-TAY, TG-TAM, TG-TAG
- 2 Piper PA-34 TG-TAA, TG-TAH
- 1 Beechcraft BE-300
- 1 Saab 340

== Incidents and accidents ==
- 2 June 2005: A Let 410, reg. TG-TAG, with 17 passengers on board crashed while returning to Zacapa airport. Shortly after take-off the crew reported technical problems. All occupants survived the accident.
- 14 February 2008: A Bell 206, reg. TG-TAB, with 4 passengers on board crashed near Rio Dulce while on-route to Puerto Barrios. The pilot, Carlos Maldonado managed to make an emergency landing. All four occupants were injured.
