= Directorate General of Civil Aeronautics (Guatemala) =

- Dirección General de Aeronáutica Civil
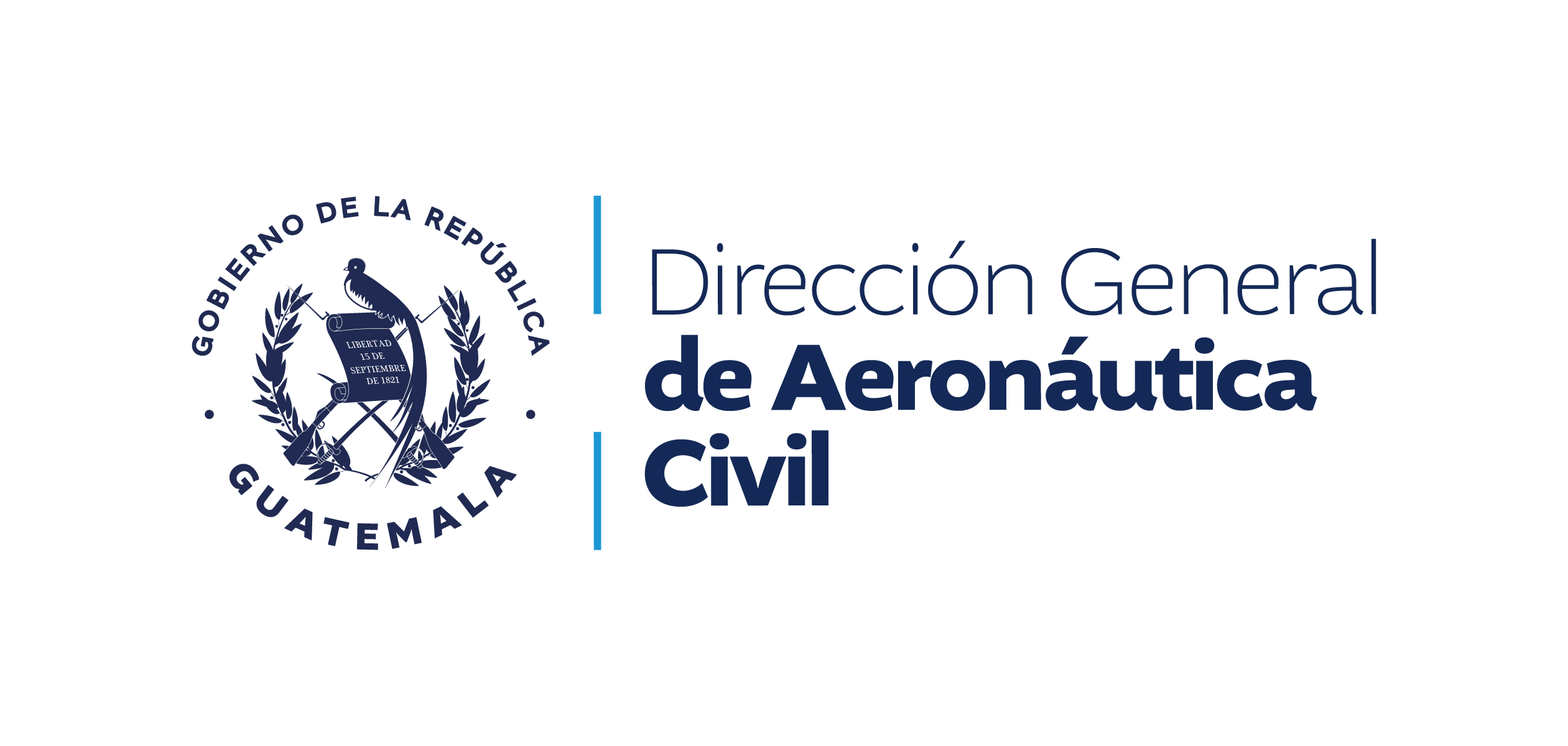
- Agency logo

Agency overview
- Formed: September 11, 1929; 96 years ago
- Jurisdiction: Guatemala
- Headquarters: La Aurora International Airport; Zone 13, Guatemala City
- Website: dgac.gob.gt

The Directorate General of Civil Aeronautics (Spanish: Dirección General de Aeronáutica Civil, DGAC) is the civil aviation authority of Guatemala. Its headquarters are on the property of La Aurora International Airport in Zone 13 of Guatemala City.

== History ==
The agency was created under the government of Lázaro Chacón González on September 11, 1929, by government decree 1032, as a daughter agency of the Ministry of Communications and Public Works (Spanish: Ministerio de Comunicaciones y Obras Públicas), today the Ministry of Communications, Infrastructure, and Housing.

== Divisions ==
The Accident Investigation Section (Spanish: Seccion de Investigación de Accidentes) investigates aircraft accidents and incidents.

== See also ==
- Cubana de Aviación Flight 1216
