= Transport in Guatemala =

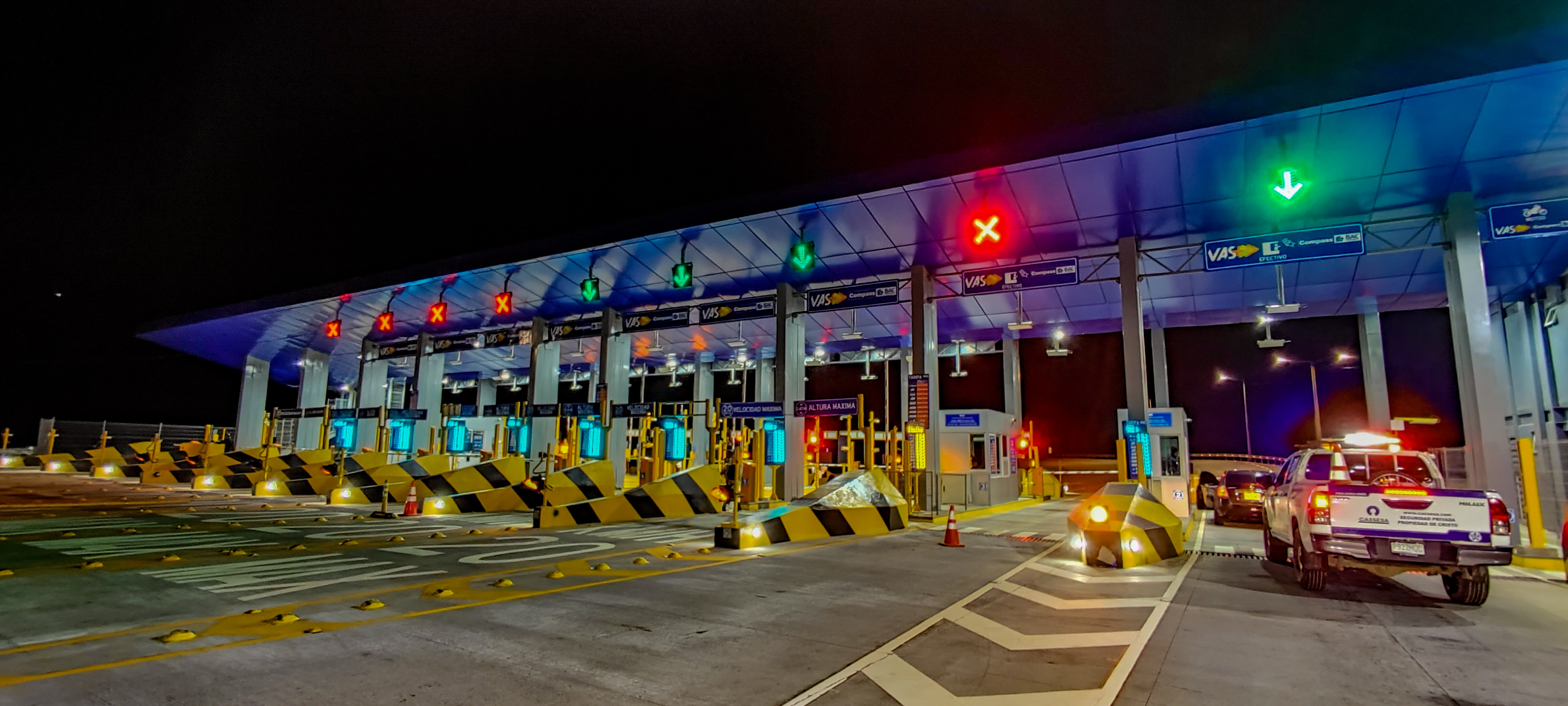
Toll to enter Guatemala City

Transportation in Guatemala includes roads, waterways, airports and a short cross-border rail line from Mexico.

The Ministry of Communications, Infrastructure, and Housing oversees the planning, maintenance and development of infrastructure and transport systems. The General Directorate of Roads is responsible for the planning, design and supervision of construction works and maintenance of the country's roads.

== Roads ==
Guatemala has an extensive road network, where 12.72% of the roads connect with Mexico and Central America, 17.27% are National Roads, 43.84% are Departmental and 26.17% are Rural. All the country's roads have Guatemala City as their point of origin. Among the busiest international routes in the country are the Pan-American highway that connects Mexico with Central America and the CA-9 highway that connects Puerto Barrios in the Guatemalan Caribbean with Puerto Quetzal in the Pacific.

=== Urban transportation ===
The urban transport system began in Guatemala City in the 1990s and since then it has been one of the most used means of transport within metropolitan areas. Bus services such as Transmetro and Transurbano differ from other means of transportation, such as private or departmental public transport as they are regulated by lines with defined stops and are primarily used for short-distance transportation.

Urban Transport Systems in Guatemala
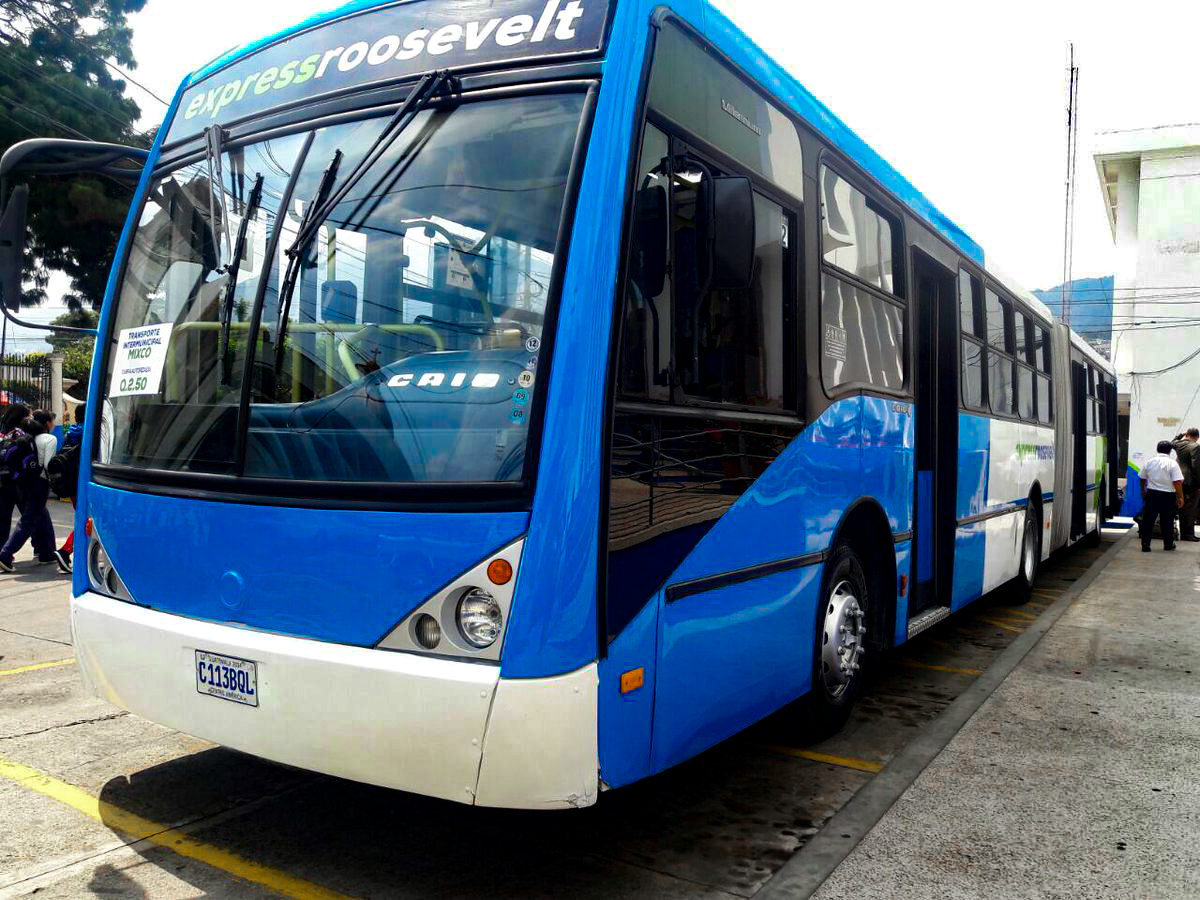
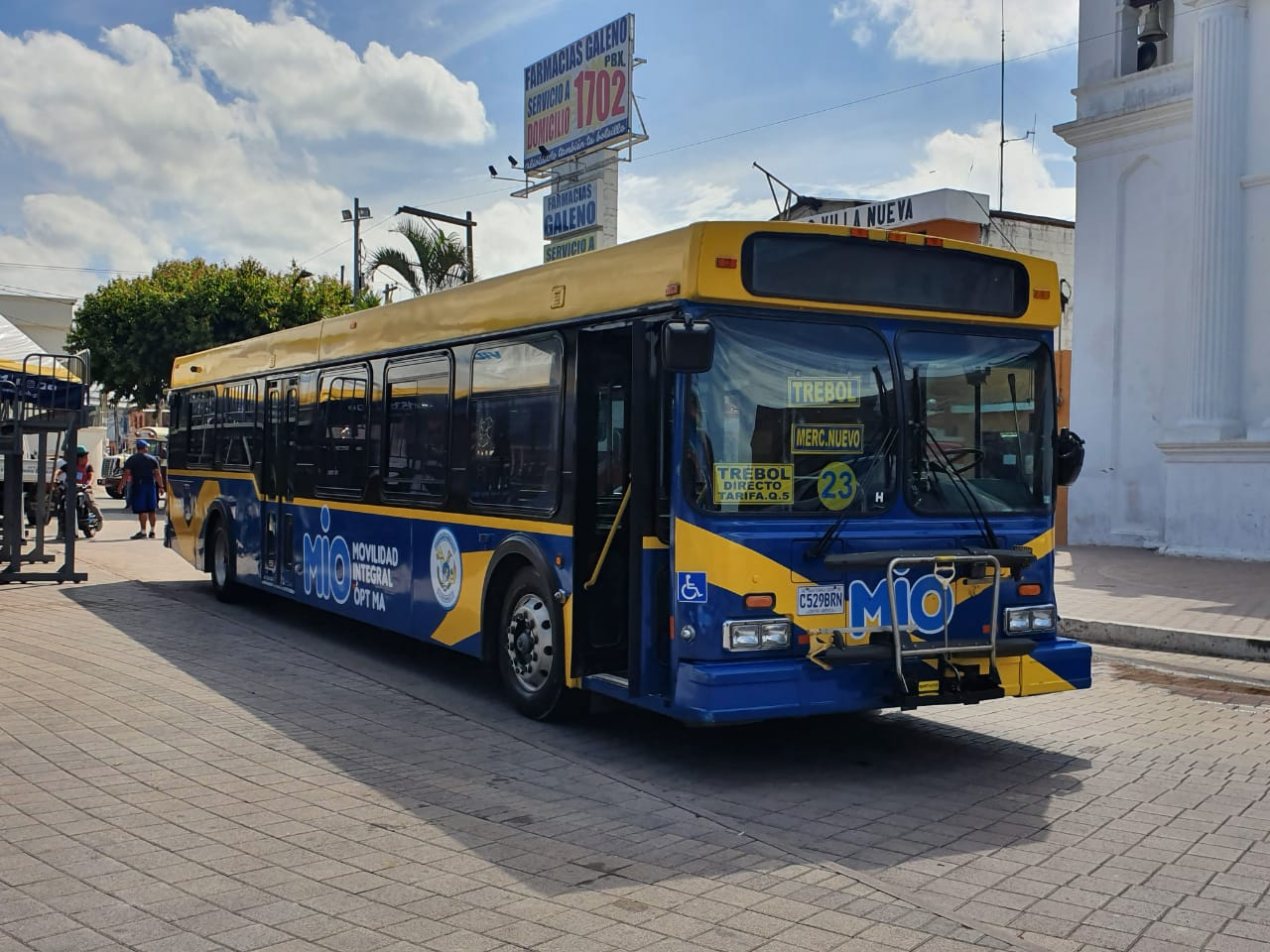
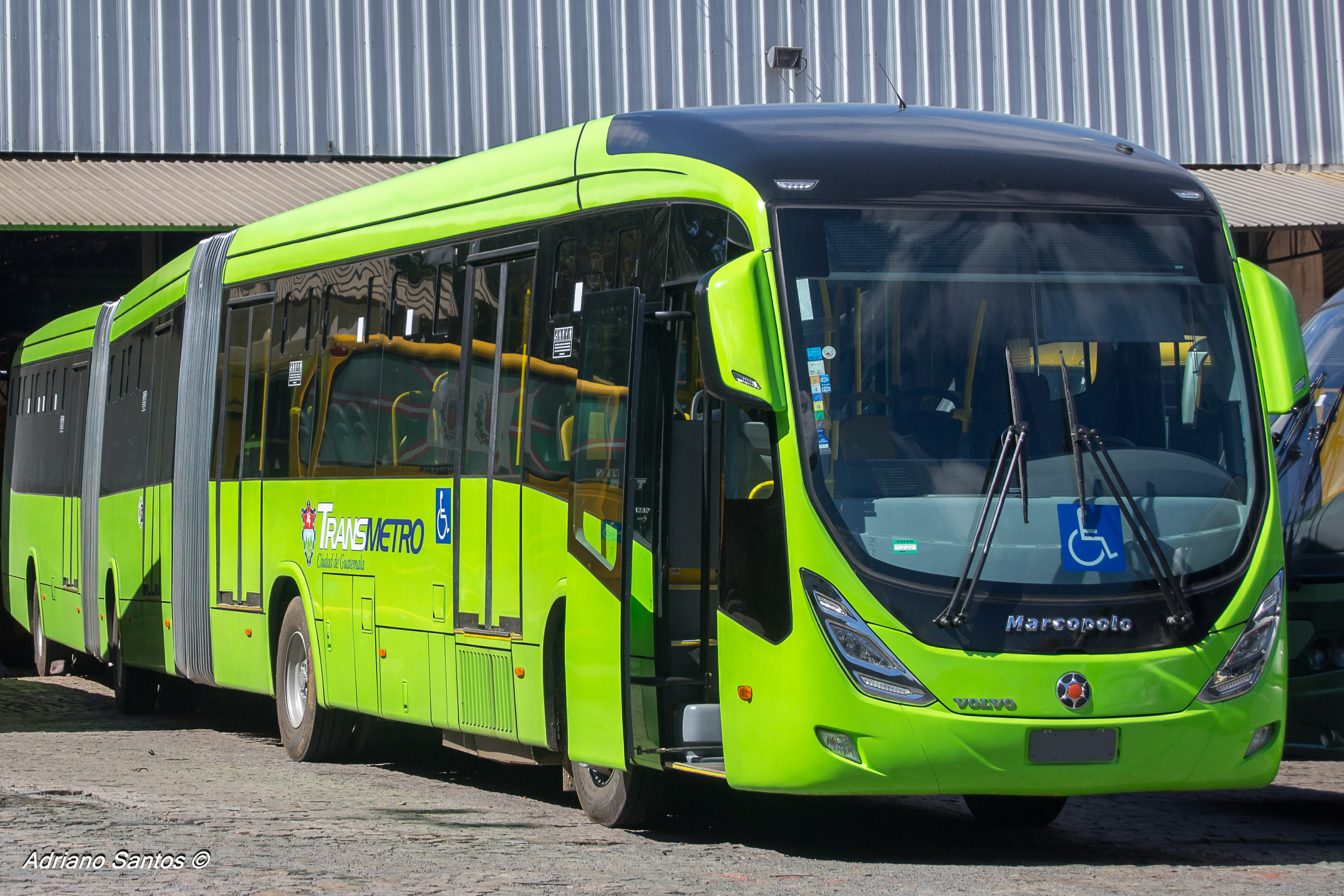
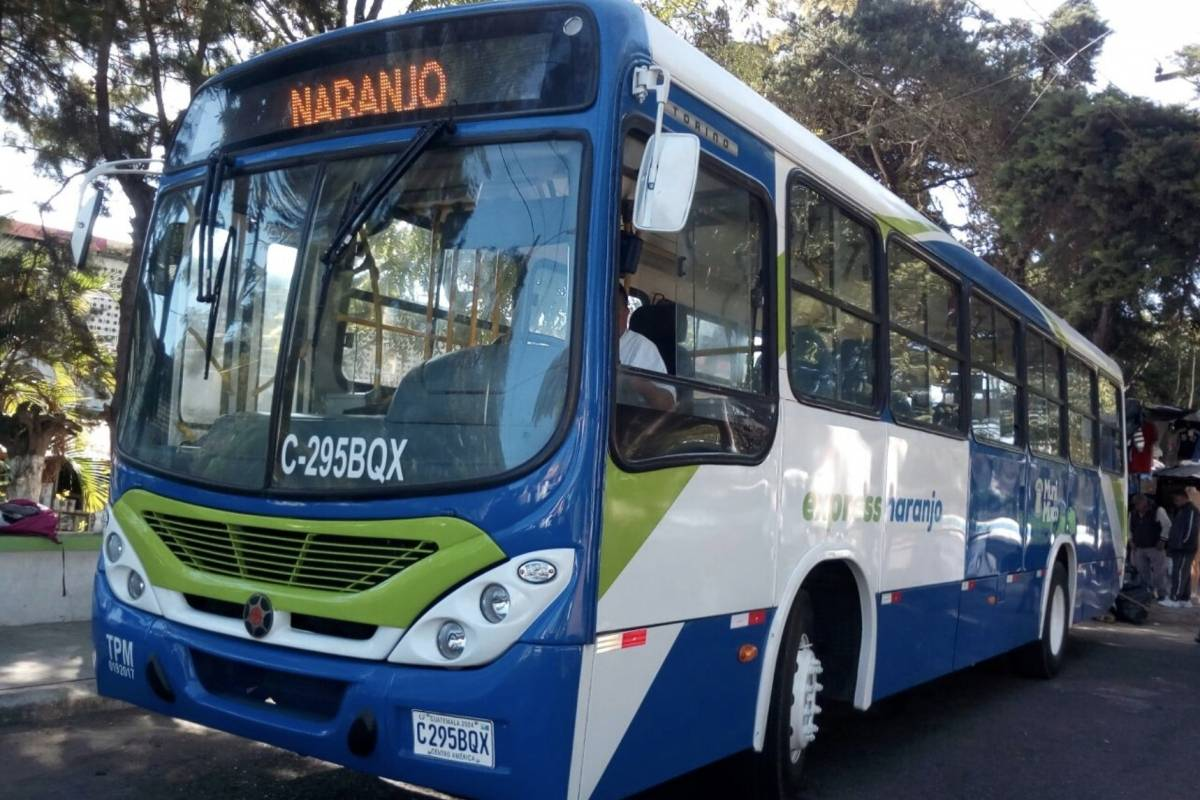
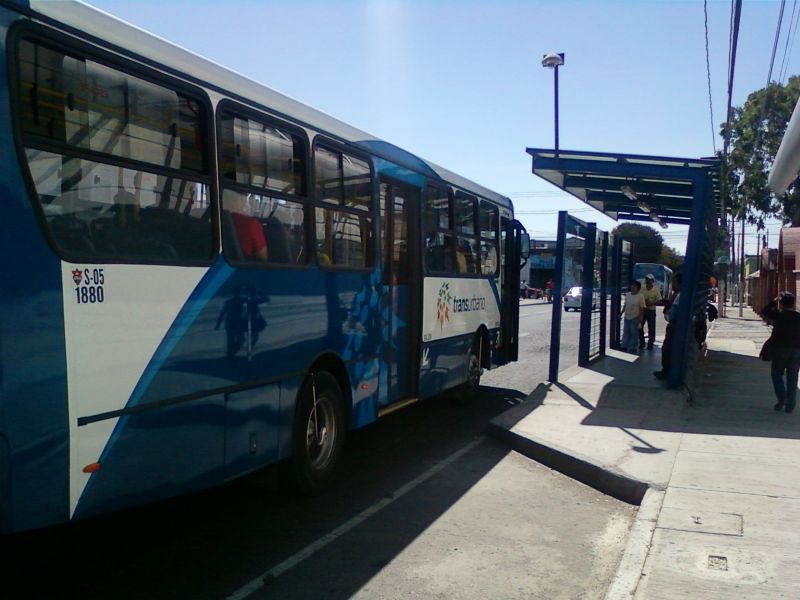

=== Intercity transportation ===
The Intercity system connects various cities, departments, and countries. It is mainly used for long-distance travel. In Guatemala, it is common to see Chicken buses, which are recycled and often colorfully painted former US school buses. There are also Pullman buses that offer different destinations within Guatemalan territory.

Intercity Transport Systems in Guatemala
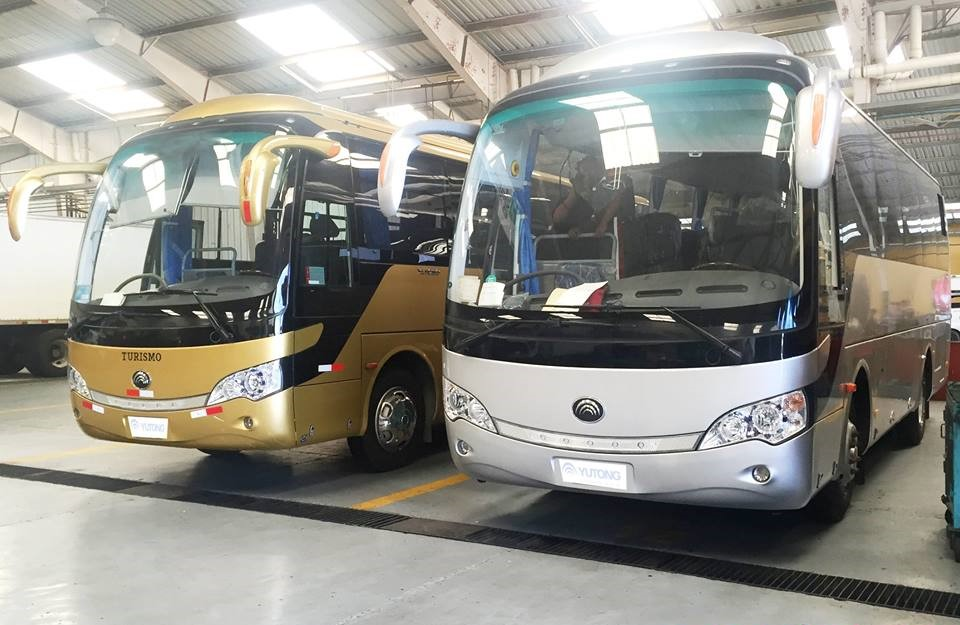
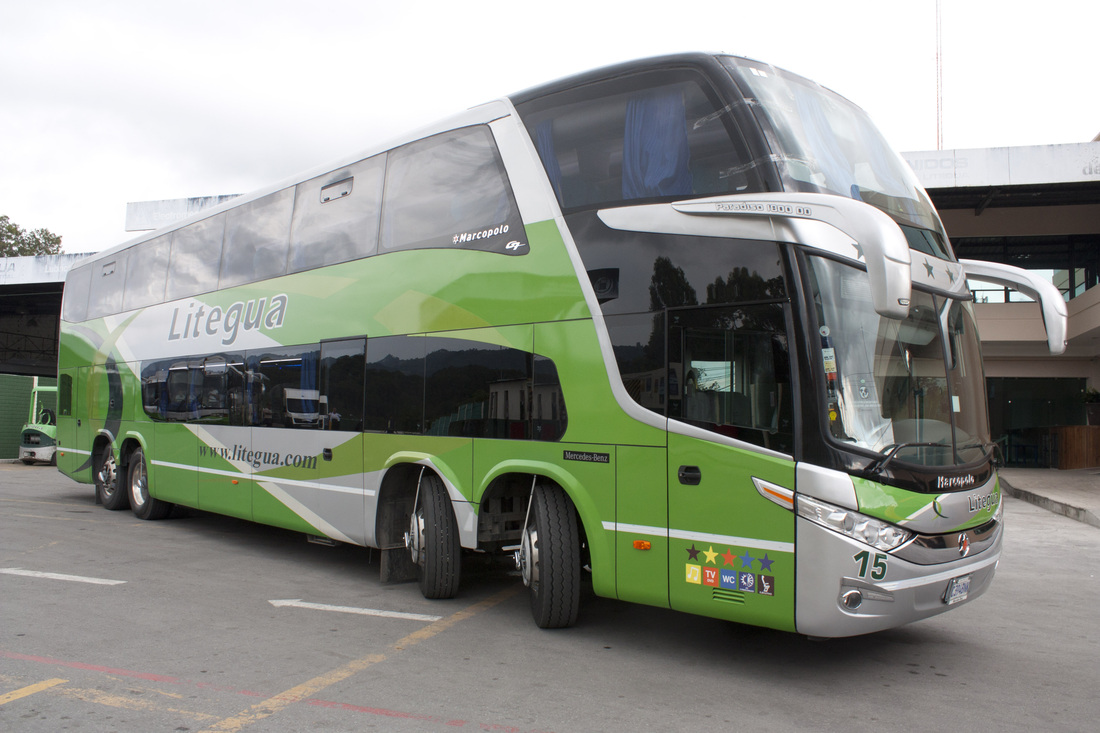
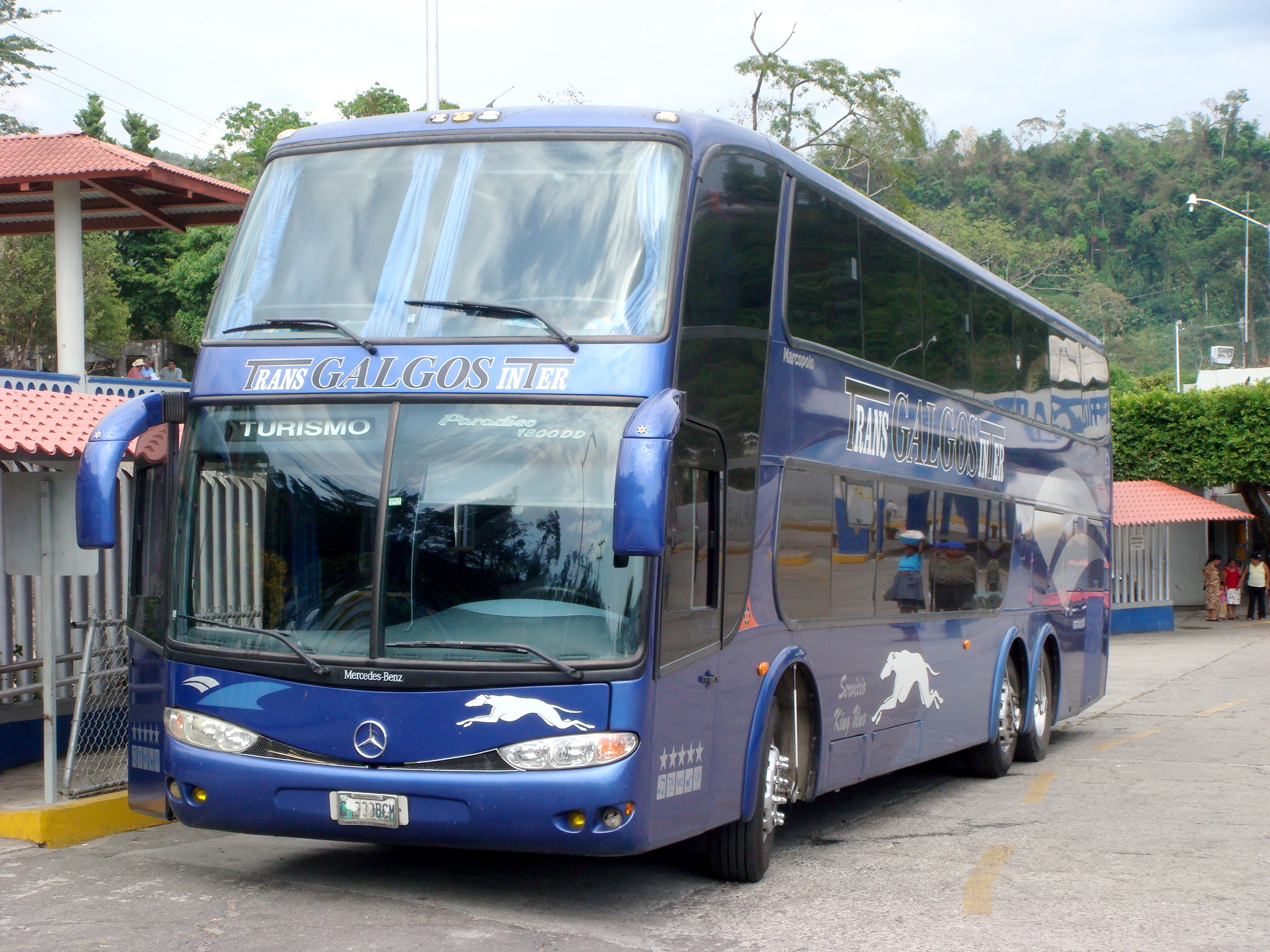
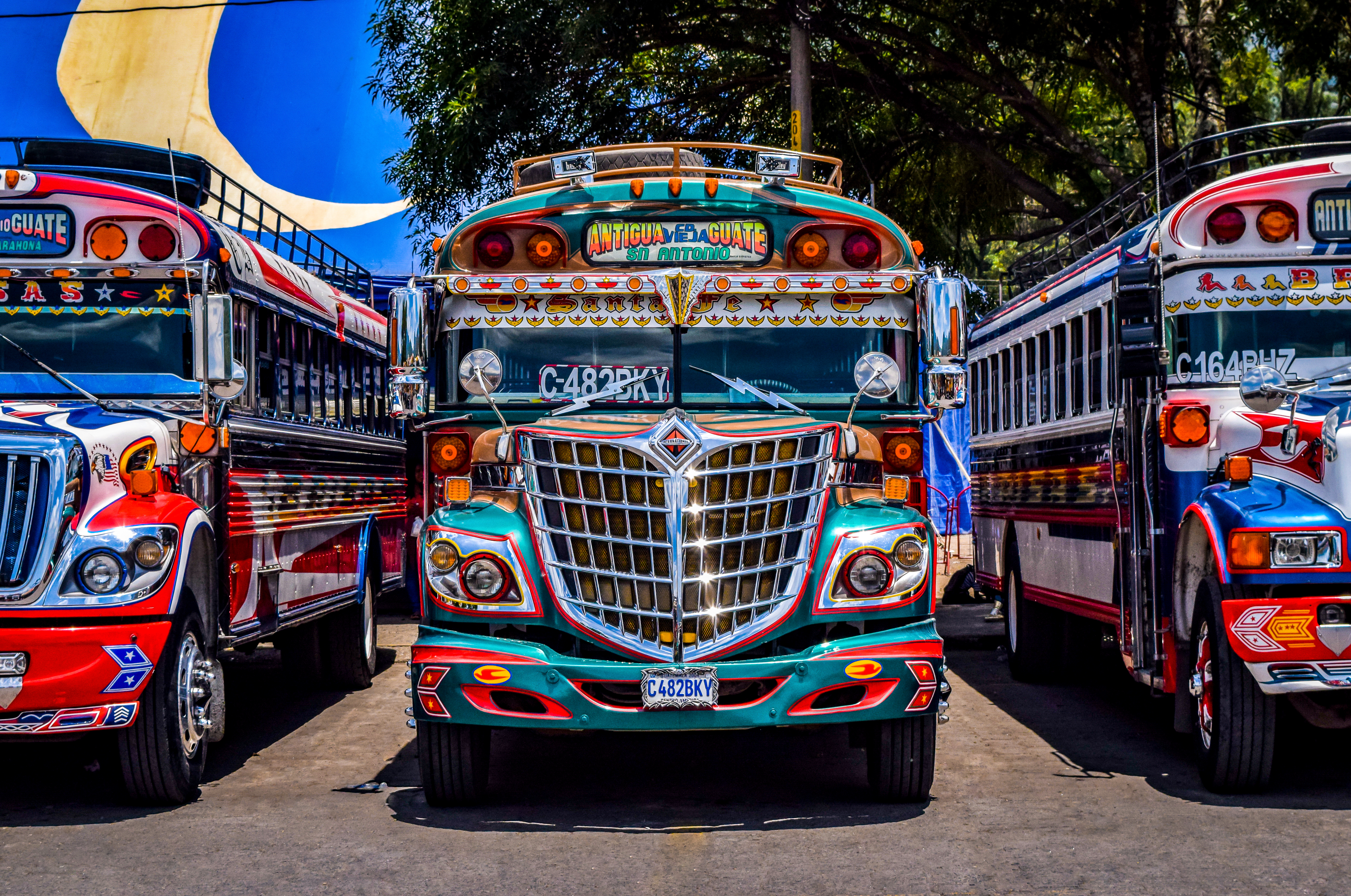

==== Streets ====
Guatemalan streets tend to be one-ways to ease congestion and move traffic.

==== Highways ====
- Total: 14,095 km
- Paved: 4,863 km (including 75 km of expressways)
- Unpaved: 9,232 km (1999 est.)

== Airports ==
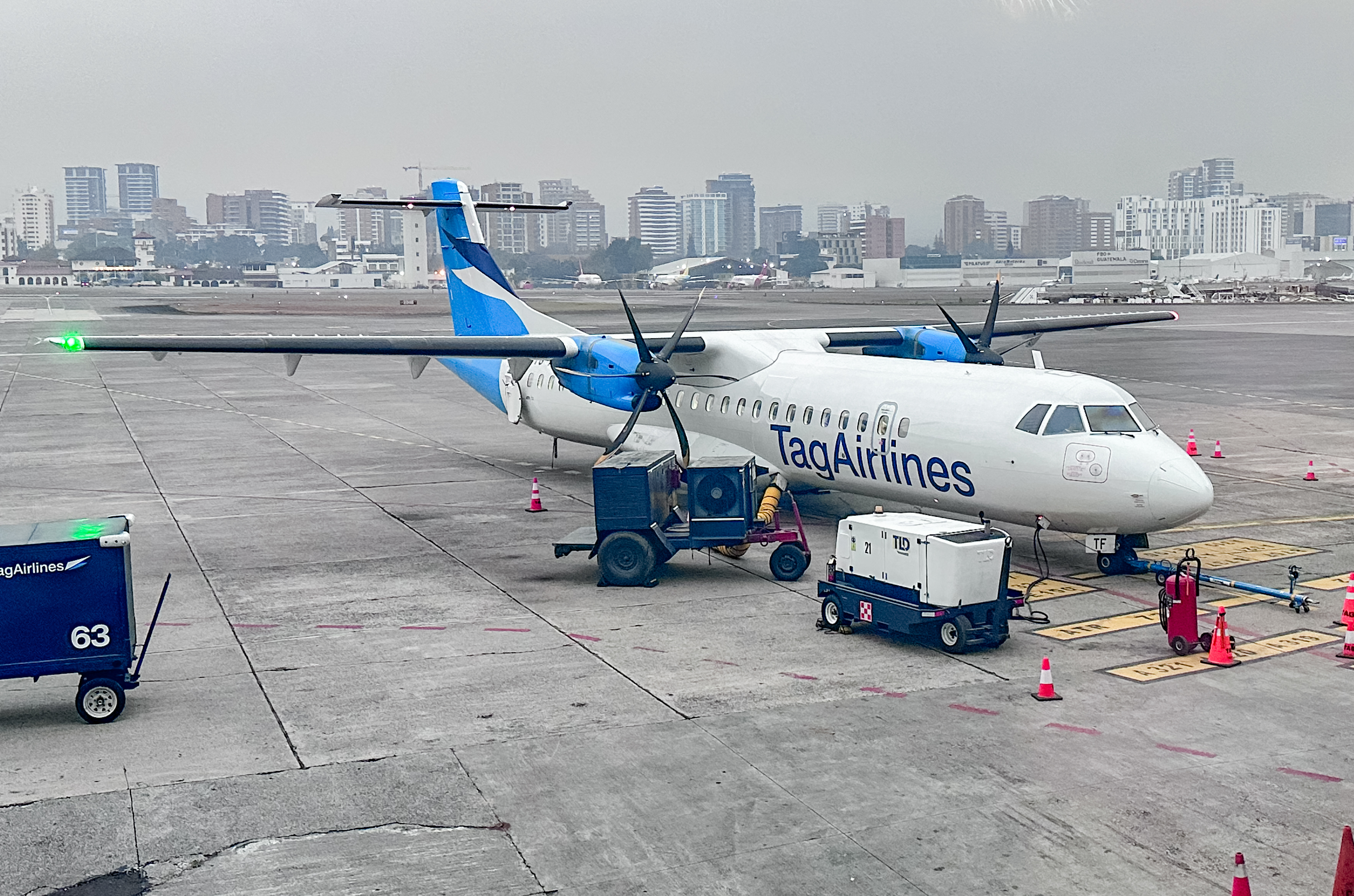
ATR 72-500 of TAG Airlines, Guatemala's flag carrier at La Aurora International Airport.

Guatemala has a total of 402 airports and airstrips. Among these, three are international: La Aurora International Airport located in Guatemala City, Mundo Maya International Airport in Santa Elena de la Cruz, and Western International Airport in Quetzaltenango.

The General Directorate of Civil Aeronautics (DGAC) is the state agency responsible for regulating civil aviation throughout the country. Its primary functions include: managing the airports of Guatemala, controlling traffic in the national airspace, and overseeing the operation and acquisition of aircraft throughout the republic.

=== Named airports ===
- La Aurora International Airport
- Mundo Maya International Airport
- San José Airport
- Quetzaltenango Airport
- Puerto Barrios Airport

=== Airports - with paved runways ===
- total: 11
- 2,438 to 3,047 m: 3
- 1,524 to 2,437 m: 2
- 914 to 1,523 m: 4
- under 914 m: 2 (2006 est.)

=== Airports - with unpaved runways ===
- total: 439
- 2,438 to 3,047 m: 1
- 1,524 to 2,437 m: 8
- 914 to 1,523 m: 111
- under 914 m: 319 (2006 est.)

== Railways ==
total:

- 1.65 km (1.03 miles) cross border link from Mexico to Tecun Uman rebuilt as standard gauge 1,435 mm (4 ft 8 1/2 in) in 2019
- 322 km (200 mi) operated by the Railroad Development Corporation until September 2007, now closed
- 563 km (350 mi) closed

narrow gauge: 884 km 3 ft (914 mm) gauge (single track)

=== Railway links with adjacent countries ===
- Mexico - short link since 2019, previously break-of-gauge 3 ft (914 mm)/4 ft 8 1/2 in (1,435 mm)
- Belize - None
- Honduras - none in use - break-of-gauge 3 ft (914 mm)/3 ft 6 in (1,067 mm) (?)
- El Salvador - currently closed

== Waterways ==
260 km navigable year round; additional 730 km navigable during high-water season

== Pipelines ==
- oil 480 km

== Ports and harbors ==
=== Atlantic Ocean ===
- Puerto Barrios
- Santo Tomás de Castilla

=== Pacific Ocean ===
- Champerico, Puerto Quetzal, Puerto San José

=== Merchant marine ===
None (1999 est.)

=== Boats ===
Ferries serve as a mode of transportation in certain regions, such as Sayaxché and for traveling between the cities of Puerto Barrios and Livingston. They are also used to connect multiple coastal towns in Lake Atitlán.

== See also ==
- Airports in Guatemala
- Rail transport in Guatemala
- Guatemalan Air Force
- General Directorate of Civil Aeronautics
- Ministry of Communications, Infrastructure, and Housing
- 2025 Guatemala City bus crash
