= Northern Railroad of Guatemala =

Guatemala Northern Railway
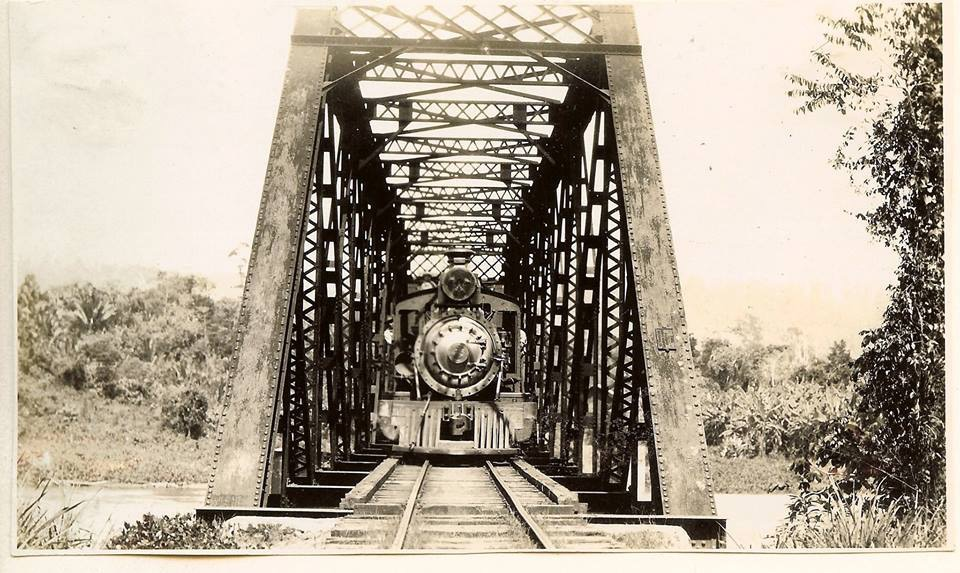
- Bridge over Motagua River, c. 1940.

Overview
- Status: Closed to public
- Connecting lines: Ferrocarril de Ocós; Ferrocarril del Sur; Ferrocarril a El Salvador

Service
- Operator(s): International Railways of Central America (IRCA) (formerly); Ferrocarriles de Guatemala (FEGUA) (formerly); Ferrovias Guatemala (FVG)

History
- Opened: 1896
Route map
Interoceanic railways sections and stations built during general José María Reina Barrios tenure. The Panajax -Guatemala City section could not be built due to the steep mountain terrain and the lack of funds after the Guatemalan economy crashed in early 1897.
1. Puerto Barrios
2. Tenedores
3. Los Amates
4. Gualán
5. El Rancho
6. Panajax
7. Palín
8. Escuintla
9. Iztapa

The Northern Railroad of Guatemala was a railway system that ran from Guatemala City to Puerto Barrios, the main port of Guatemala, between 1896 and 1968. The American United Fruit Company had the monopoly of the railway system through its affiliate, International Railways of Central America (IRCA), along with the docks at Puerto Barrios, the banana plantations in Izabal and the cargo and passenger transport with its Great White Fleet. The system was highly efficient, but once a parallel highway was built, it could not compete and eventually was handed back to the State of Guatemala in 1968. After that, the system slowly lost its relevance, as the trucks were more profitable than railway transportation along this route. It ceased regular operations in 1996, and has remained partially abandoned since.

== History ==
=== Initial project ===
In 1883, then president general Justo Rufino Barrios had the plan to connect Guatemala City to a port in the Atlantic shore through a railroad in order to be able to move the coffee produced by his own haciendas and those of his liberal partners; therefore, on 4 August 1883, he issued a decree in which a person with a salary of more than 4 pesos a month could pay 4 pesos a year over a 10-year span to finance the railroad. However, after the untimely death of Barrios in the Battle of Chalchuapa in 1885, this plan was forgotten by his successor, general Manuel Lisandro Barillas.

=== Central American expo ===
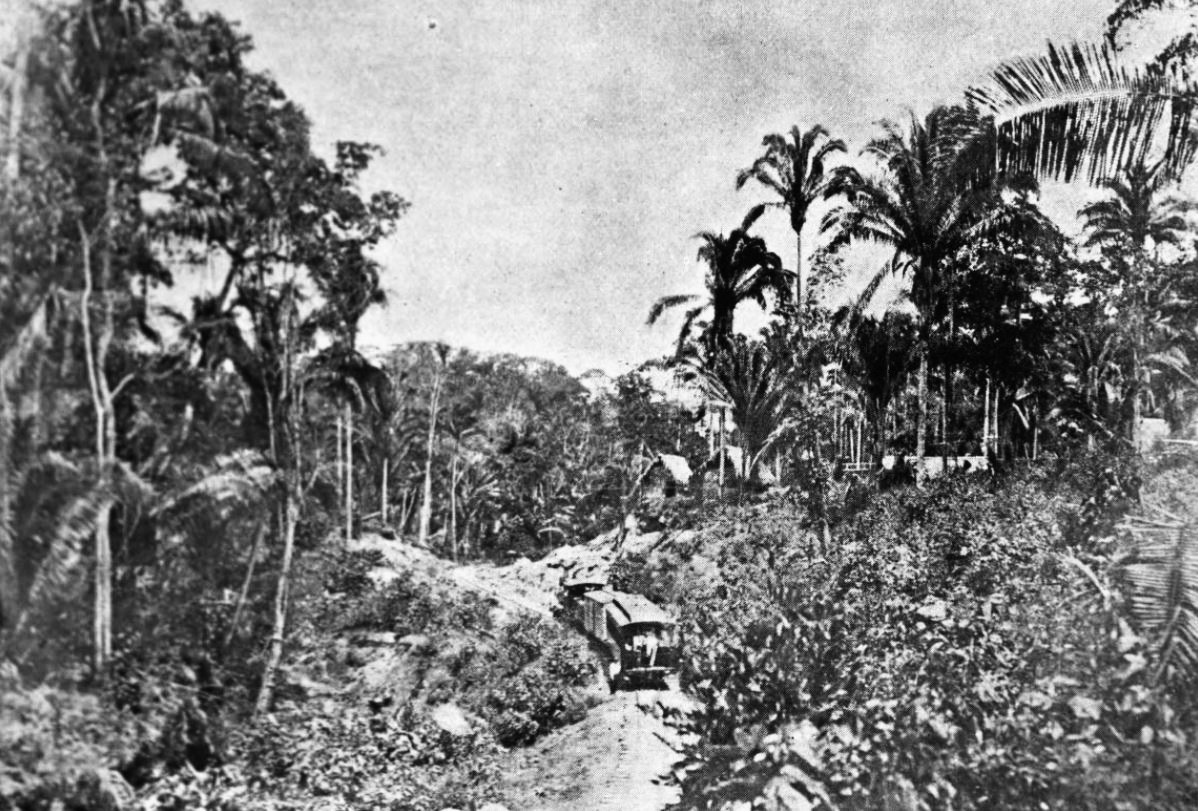
Jungle section in 1896. La Ilustración Guatemalteca photograph.

It was not until in 1892, when José María Reyna Barrios assumed power, that the railroad project was started once again. On 19 July 1895, Reina Barrios issued the executive action #513, which established that, between the Escondido and Estrecho rivers, a city was to be founded, and that it was going to be called Puerto Barrios. The ceremonial act of foundation took place on 5 December 1892. Furthermore, a part of the Northern Railroad project, the executive action #524 declared Puerto Barrios as "Major port of the Republic" and ordered to transfer over there the customs that used to be in Livingston.

Given that in those days most visitors arriving from Europe and North America arrived at the port on the Caribbean Sea shore, Reina Barrios pushed for the Northern Railroad to be finished on time. Not only was the railroad vital for the Expo success, it was key to transport merchandise and passengers between the Caribbean Sea and the new Port of Iztapa on the Pacific shore of the country. Reina Barrios had high hopes on the railroad to improve the progress and development of the country given that the United States and Spain were still at war over Cuba, and it was evident that a dependable interoceanic communication line was crucial for the North American country. Completing a transoceanic railway was a main objective of Reina Barrios government, with a goal to attract international investors at a time when the Panama Canal was not built yet. However, a sharp decline in the price of coffee and silver, along with the high technical difficulties of the railroad construction close to Guatemala City −mainly due to the steep cliffs and mountain sides around the city− resulted in the collapse of Guatemala's economy, a failure of the Exposición Centroamericana and the eventual murder of president Reina Barrios, on 8 February 1898.

After Reina Barrios's death, civilian lawyer Manuel Estrada Cabrera was designated as president and inherited an enormous −for the times− external debt with British banks, which forced him to search for an ally in the United States. In 1900, Estrada Cabrera authorized his Secretary of Economy, Rafael Spínola, to set up a contract with an American company, the Central American Improvement Co. Inc., to finish the Northern Railroad and fix those stretches that were in disrepair on the rest of the line. To cover for the expenses, the Guatemalan government gave a concession to the American company to use the railroad along with all of its facilities without any cost; this included the port and dock in Puerto Barrios, for which the Guatemalan people and government had to pay fees if they wanted to use them.

=== Concession to United Fruit Company ===
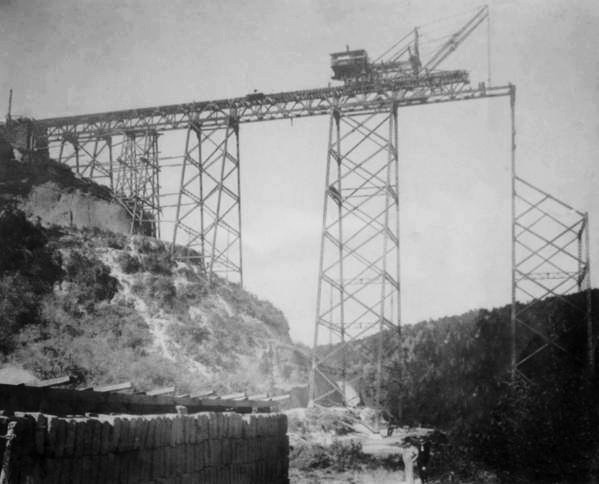
Bridge of Las Vacas construction in Guatemala City in 1907.

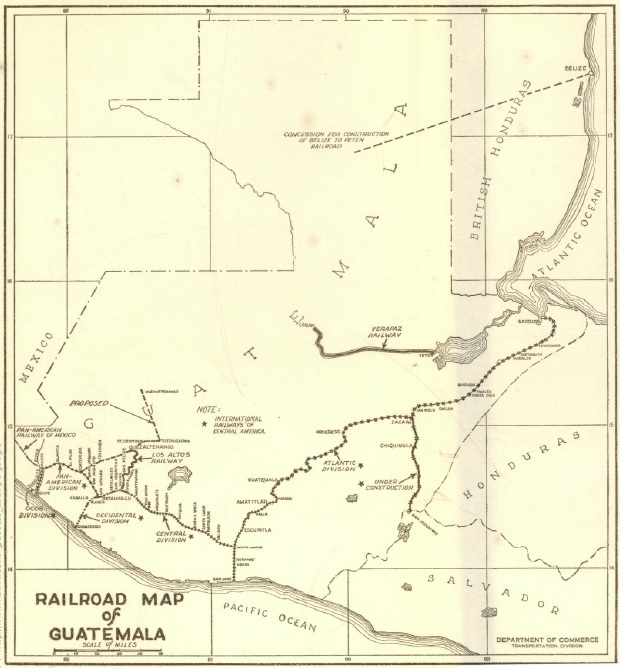
Guatemala rail map from 1925.

Finally, in 1904, knowing the pro-American attitude of Estrada Cabrera, Minor Keith partners, (Note: Keith owned United Fruit Company and had already built several railroads in Central America,) began to get concession on railroads of both Guatemala and El Salvador, and in that year, International Railways of Central American (IRCA) was incorporated in New Jersey; the harbor was then partly built by Theodore Roosevelt's Corps of Engineers in 1906–1908. Eventually, United Fruit Company, owner of IRCA, controlled Puerto Barrios completely, as it owned the docks, the railroads, the banana production from Izabal and, even, the merchant fleet that transported the cargo and passengers out of the port: the Great White Fleet.

During this period, the railroad company offered tours to visit the UFCO banana plantations in Izabal and the Maya city of Quiriguá —which at the time was placed within UFCO property— and offered their visitors the option to comfortably sail Río Dulce and Lake Izabal to Livingston in one of their steam boats.

Here are a few photographs taken from an excursion made in 1927 by the Guatemalan History and Geography Society, which shows the amenities these tours had:

Izabal excursion in 1927

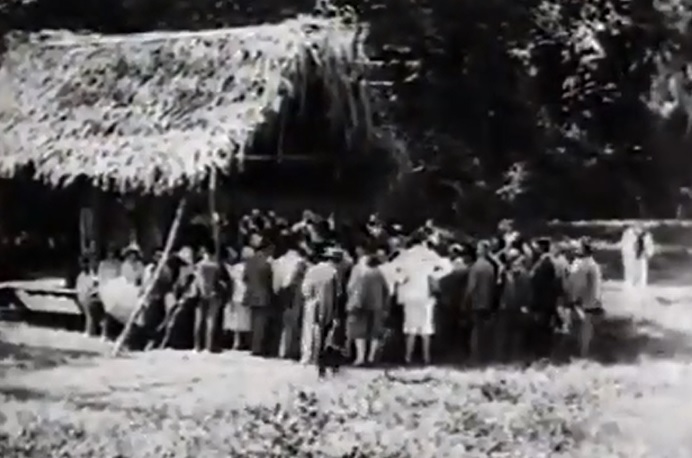
Maya monument in Quiriguá; note how everybody is dress in formal attire and women are wearing skirts and heels.

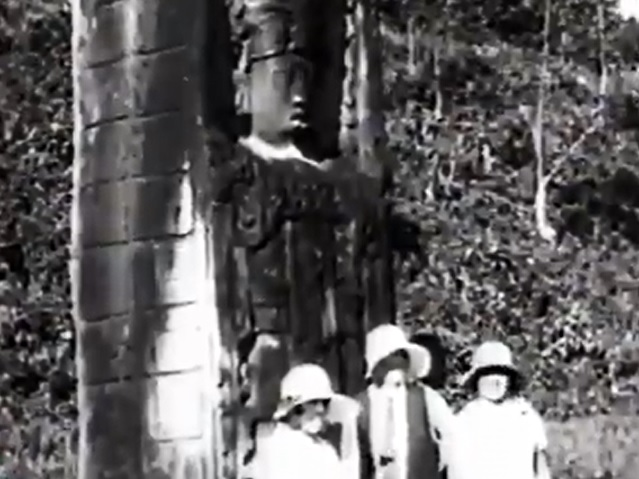
Visitors next to a Maya estela

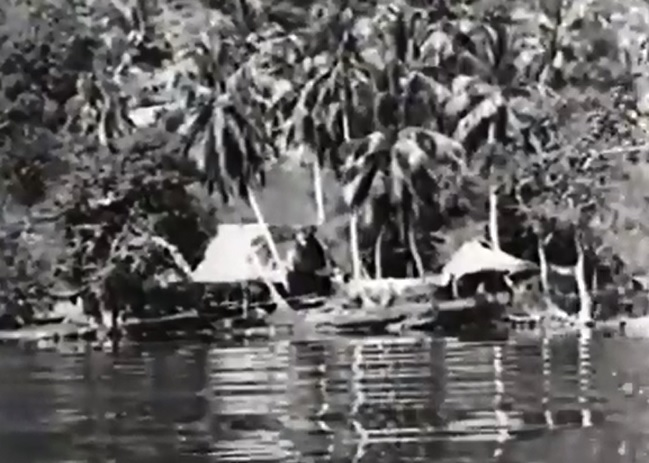
Homes by Río Dulce, filmed from one of the IRCA steamboats. The Tarzan movies shows almost identical shots.

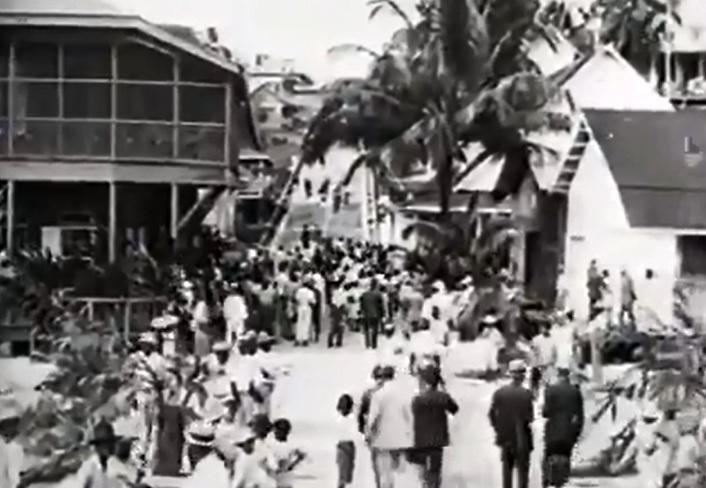
Tourist in Livingston, Izabal, after sailing Río Dulce

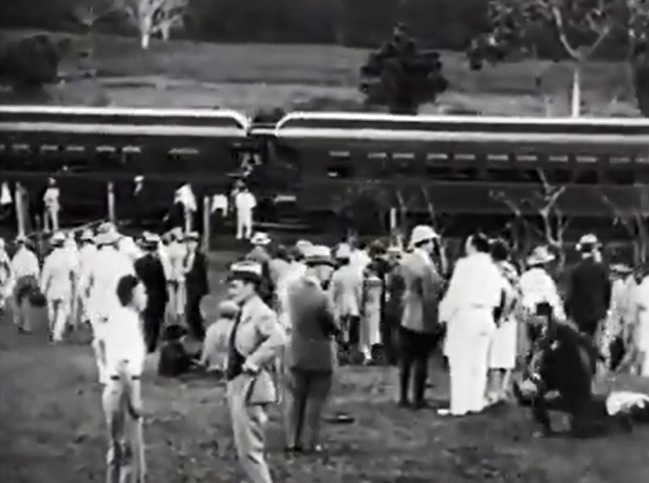
Ready to return to Guatemala City; note how they seem relaxed and comfortable

The government of colonel Jacobo Árbenz Guzmán (1951–1954) decided to build a highway and another port – Santo Tomas de Castilla – to compete with the American fruit company. He also issued an Agrarian Reform that impacted UFCO land. Eventually, Árbenz was accused of Communism and was ousted in 1954, but the highway was almost completed and was completed by his successor, colonel Carlos Castillo Armas. Just as Arbenz had hoped, IRCA's last profit was reported in 1957.

=== Construction of Atlantic Highway and Santo Tomas de Castilla Harbor ===
In order to establish the necessary physical infrastructure to make possible the "independent" and national capitalist development that could reduce the extreme dependence on the United States and break the American monopolies operating in the country, president Jacobo Árbenz and his government began the planning and construction of the Atlantic Highway, which was intended to compete with the monopoly on land transport exerted by the United Fruit Company, through one of its subsidiaries: the International Railways of Central America (IRCA), which had the concession since 1904, when it was granted by then president Manuel Estrada Cabrera. Construction of the highway began by the Roads Department of the Ministry of Communications, with the help of the military engineering battalion. It was planned to be built parallel along the railway line, as much as possible. The construction of the new port was also aimed to break another UFCO monopoly, since Puerto Barrios was owned and operated solely by The Great White Fleet, another UFCO's subsidiary.

=== Collapse ===
In 1954, United Fruit had to divest following an antitrust suit and in 1959, and the parallel highway caused a serious competitive pressure. By 1968, IRCA defaulted and was taken over by the government who renamed it as "Ferrocarriles de Guatemala" which was also known as "FEGUA". The condition of tracks continued to deteriorate and all traffic was shut down in 1996. Only nostalgic tourist trains (by Trains Unlimited) ran on parts of the network in 1997 and 1998.

=== Revival attempt ===
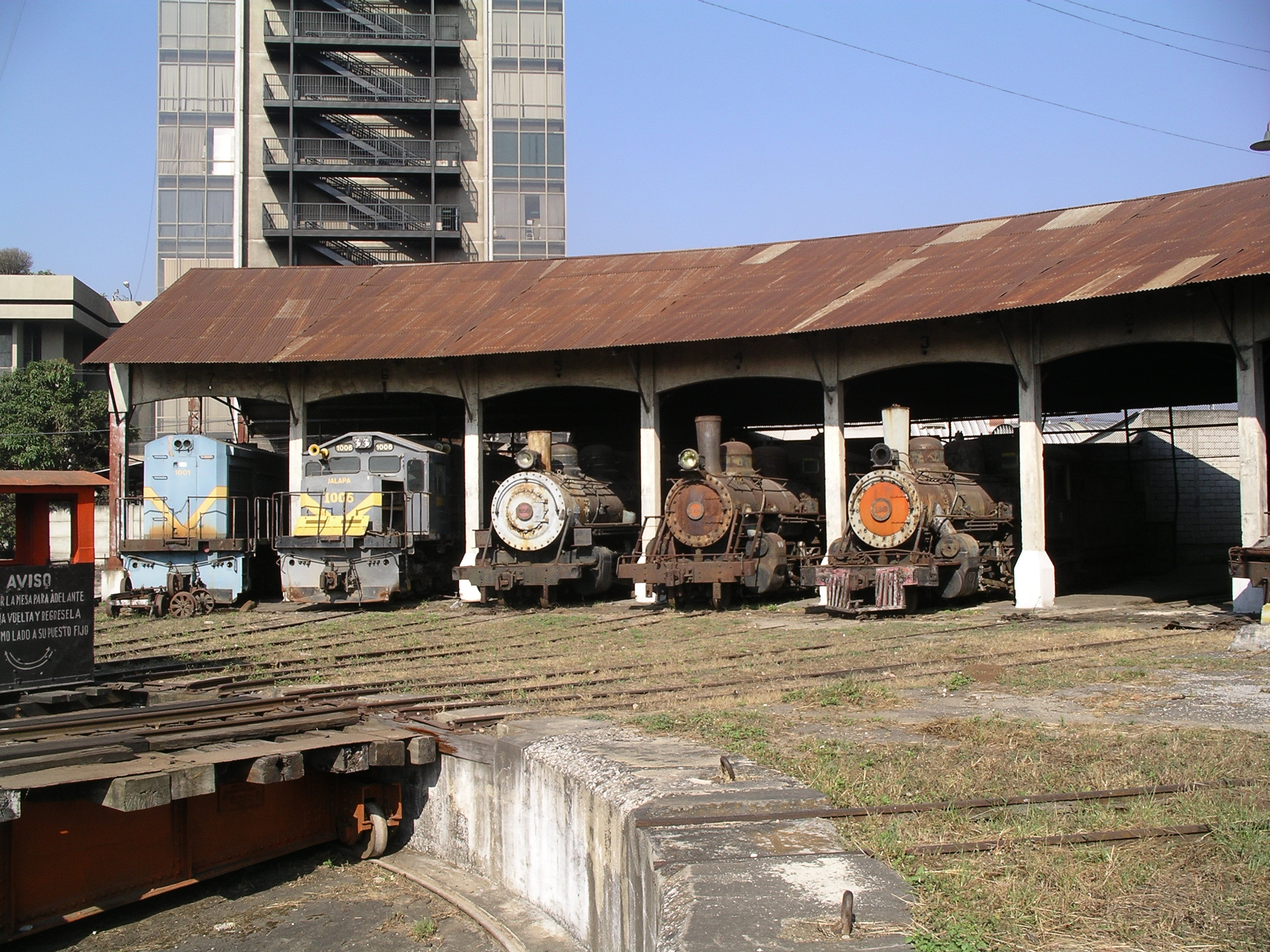
Roundhouse at Guatemala City Station with Diesel and Steam locomotives on February 14, 2007

In October 1997, a 50-year concession was given to Railroad Development Corporation (RDC) which started to rehabilitate the network. They were delayed by the need to evict squatters who built their cottages on the right-of-way during the previous years and to repair damage caused by thieves and nature. A serious blow was Hurricane Mitch in 1998, which destroyed parts of the line. The first train under RDC management went from Guatemala City to El Chile cement plant on April 15, 1999, and the rest of the line to Puerto Barrios was put into operation in December of that year.

From 1999 until September 2007, Ferrovías Guatemala (FVG), as a subsidiary of RDC, operated 15 engines and 200 railcars on freight trains between Guatemala City and Puerto Barrios. It transported containers, steel, cement, paper and bananas between the Caribbean coast and the capital over a network of 200 miles (320 km) as of 2006, but quit in September 2007. It connected Guatemala City to Puerto Barrios with short branches in Guatemala City container terminal and Puerto Santo Tomás.

=== Suspension of operations in 2007 ===
In August 2006, the government of Guatemala declared a 2003 contract for the usufruct of rolling stock and other equipment as contrary to public interest (es:Declaración de lesividad), invalidating it. FVG believed that this was a response to its earlier request for arbitration regarding the usage of US$2 million from National Railroad Trust, designated for the development of railroads in Guatemala but used to support an overstaffed governmental oversight agency.

The result of the governmental action was a decline of shipments and operational difficulties, such as inability to obtain credit or take additional revenues from the leasing of station buildings or right of way. In March 2007, RDC declared its intent to seek protection of investment through arbitration against the government of Guatemala according to Chapter 10 of CAFTA. The case was registered with ICSID on August 20, 2007, with number ARB/07/23. Due to the continuing uncertainty leading to losses, FVG decided to suspend all operations as of October 1, 2007 while continuing with legal actions against the Guatemalan government. The arbitration case was finally decided in favor of RDC and US$14·6m paid as compensation. As of 2011, most of the bridges have been dismantled and sold for scrap by thieves, making a potential revival of railways in Guatemala difficult, as it would cost millions of dollars to rebuild.

== See also ==
- Manuel Estrada Cabrera
- Puerto Barrios
- United Fruit Company

== Notes and references ==
=== Bibliography ===
- Buchenau, J. (1996). In the Shadow of the Giant, the Making of Mexico's Central America Policy (1876–1930) (Vintage ed.). Univ of Alabama Pr. ISBN 0-8173-0829-6.
- Estrada Paniagua, Felipe (1908). Recopilación de las leyes de la República de Guatemala (15 de marzo de 1900 a 15 de marzo de 1901) (in Spanish). Vol. XIX. Guatemala: Arturo Síguere y Cía.
