= Climbing Italian Championships =

Competition climbing event

Climbing Italian Championships are annual national championships for competition climbing organised by the Italian Climbing Federation (Federazione Arrampicata Sportiva Italiana, FASI). The first championships was held in 1985 with only lead discipline. In 2000, speed and bouldering disciplines were introduced to the championships for the first time.

== Lead ==
In 1985 and 1986, the title of Italian champions was established based on the placings obtained by the athletes participating in Sportroccia. In 1987, the championships moved to the artificial walls of Torino Palavela in Turin.

From 1989 to 1993 instead of a single race the Italian Lead Championships took place in stages. In 1994 it returned to the single race and the championship was joined by a competition circuit Lead Italian Cup.

	Year	Location	Men			Women			Note
	Year	Location	Gold	Silver	Bronze	Gold	Silver	Bronze	Note
I.	1985	Bardonecchia	Roberto Bassi	Andrea Gallo	Mario Roversi	Luisa Iovane	Emanuela Lanza	Giuliana Scaglioni	
II.	1986	Bardonecchia	Roberto Bassi	Andrea Di Bari	Maurizio Giordani	Rosanna Manfrini	Giuliana Scaglioni	Emanuela Lanza	
III.	1987	Turín	Marzio Nardi	Andrea Gallo	Andrea Di Bari	Luisa Iovane	Laura Ferrero	Daniela Luzzini	
IV.	1988	Turín	Marzio Nardi	Alberto Gnerro	Andrea Di Bari	Luisa Iovane	Daniela Luzzini	Raffaella Valsecchi	
V.	1989	5 stages	Alberto Gnerro	Stefano Alippi	Andrea Gallo	Paola Pons	Luisa Iovane	Raffaella Valsecchi	
VI.	1990	6 stages	Alberto Gnerro	Severino Scassa	Andrea Gallo	Luisa Iovane	Daniela Luzzini	Raffaella Valsecchi	
VII.	1991	? stages	Severino Scassa	Luca Giupponi	Nicola Sartori	Daniela Luzzini	Paola Pons	Raffaella Valsecchi	
VIII.	1992	3 stages	Alberto Gnerro	Luca Giupponi	Nicola Sartori	Luisa Iovane	Antonella Strano	Raffaella Negretti	
IX.	1993	2 stages	Luca Zardini	Stefano Alippi	Alberto Gnerro	Luisa Iovane	Lisa Benetti	Antonella Strano	
X.	1994	Padova	Luca Zardini	Cristian Brenna	Stefano Alippi	Luisa Iovane	Antonella Strano	Nadia Tiraboschi	
XI.	1995	Courmayeur	Cristian Brenna	Luca Zardini	Donato Lella	Raffaella Valsecchi	Stella Marchisio	Laura Ferrero	
XII.	1996	Turín	Luca Zardini	Cristian Brenna	Luca Giupponi	Luisa Iovane	Raffaella Valsecchi	Stella Marchisio	
XIII.	1997	Longarone	Christian Core	Cristian Brenna	Luca Zardini	Stella Marchisio	Luisa Iovane	Lisa Benetti	
XIV.	1998	Aprica	Cristian Brenna	Flavio Crespi	Bernardino Lagni	Jenny Lavarda	Luisa Iovane	Stella Marchisio	
XV.	1999	Aprica	Cristian Brenna	Bernardino Lagni	Stefano Alippi	Jenny Lavarda	Luisa Iovane	Martina Artioli	
XVI.	2000	Turín	Luca Zardini	Luca Giupponi	Alberto Gnerro	Jenny Lavarda	Luisa Iovane	Mirella Frati	
XVII.	2001	Sesto	Bernardino Lagni	Flavio Crespi	Luca Zardini	Lisa Benetti	Luisa Iovane	Jenny Lavarda	
XVIII.	2002	Aprica	Flavio Crespi	Bernardino Lagni	Cristian Brenna	Jenny Lavarda	Lisa Benetti	Luisa Iovane	
XIX.	2003	Penne	Flavio Crespi	Bernardino Lagni	Luca Zardini	Jenny Lavarda	Luisa Iovane	Claudia Salvadori	
XX.	2004	Aprica	Flavio Crespi	Fabrizio Droetto	Luca Zardini	Jenny Lavarda	Luisa Iovane	Angelika Rainer	
XXI.	2005	Valdagno	Flavio Crespi	Luca Zardini	Massimo Battaglia	Jenny Lavarda	Lisa Benetti	Claudia Battaglia	
XXII.	2006	Premana	Flavio Crespi	Fabrizio Droetto	Donato Lella	Jenny Lavarda	Luisa Iovane	Manuela Valsecchi	
XXIII.	2007	Valdagno	Flavio Crespi	Luca Zardini	Gabriele Moroni	Jenny Lavarda	Angelika Rainer	Sara Avoscan	
XXIV.	2008	Valdagno	Luca Zardini	Nicola De Mattia	Jacopo Larcher	Jenny Lavarda	Manuela Valsecchi	Anna Gislimberti	
XXV.	2009	Valdagno	Luca Zardini	Gabriele Moroni	Flavio Crespi	Jenny Lavarda	Anna Gislimberti	Manuela Valsecchi	
XXVI.	2010	Turín	Luca Zardini	Silvio Reffo	Donato Lella	Jenny Lavarda	Andrea Pruenster	Manuela Valsecchi	
XXVII.	2011	Aprica	Marcello Bombardi	Stefano Ghisolfi	Silvio Reffo; Francesco Vettorata	Jenny Lavarda	Sara Avoscan	Andrea Pruenster	
XXVIII.	2012	Aprica	Stefano Ghisolfi	Francesco Vettorata	Nicola De Mattia	Jenny Lavarda	Andrea Ebner	Claudia Ghisolfi	
XXIX.	2013	Turín	Stefano Ghisolfi	Silvio Reffo	Francesco Vettorata	Claudia Ghisolfi	Federica Mingolla	Asja Gollo	
XXX.	2014	Bolzano	Stefano Ghisolfi	Michael Piccolruaz	Marcello Bombardi	Asja Gollo	Jenny Lavarda	Claudia Ghisolfi	
XXXI.	2015	Trento	Stefano Ghisolfi	Francesco Vettorata	Marcello Bombardi	Laura Rogora	Jenny Lavarda	Asja Gollo	
XXXII.	2016	Cavareno	Francesco Vettorata	Stefano Ghisolfi	Giorgio Bendazzoli	Laura Rogora	Andrea Ebner	Jenny Lavarda	
XXXIII.	2017	Valdagno	Stefano Ghisolfi	Marcello Bombardi	Francesco Vettorata	Jenny Lavarda	Laura Rogora	Asja Gollo	

== Speed ==
	Year	Location	Men			Women		
	Year	Location	Gold	Silver	Bronze	Gold	Silver	Bronze
I.	2000	Turín	Riccardo Scarian	Luca Giupponi	Luca Zardini	Jenny Lavarda	Cinzia Donati	Valentina Garavini
II.	2001	Sesto	Luca Giupponi	Christian Sordo	Luca Zardini	Cinzia Donati	Valentina Garavini	Claudia Salvadori
III.	2002	Aprica	Riccardo Scarian	Roberto Colonetti	Christian Sordo	Jenny Lavarda	Claudia Salvadori	Luisa Iovane
IV.	2003	Penne	Riccardo Scarian	Flavio Crespi	Luca Giupponi	Jenny Lavarda	Claudia Salvadori	Luisa Iovane
V.	2004	Aprica	Riccardo Scarian	Alberto Gnerro	Luca Giupponi	Jenny Lavarda	Angelika Rainer	Cinzia Donati
VI.	2005	Valdagno	Lucas Preti	Matthias Schmidl	Luca Giupponi	Jenny Lavarda	Angelika Rainer	Mik Shane Amici
VII.	2006	Premana	Lucas Preti	Manuel Corett	Luca Giupponi	Jenny Lavarda	Cassandra Zampar	Irene Bariani
VIII.	2007	Valdagno	Lucas Preti	Matthias Schmidl	Luca Giupponi	Jenny Lavarda	Claudia Battaglia	Eugenia Pistarà
IX.	2008	Valdagno	Lucas Preti	Stefano Ghisolfi	Alessandro Boulos	Anna Gislimberti	Jessica Morandi	Jenny Lavarda
X.	2009	Valdagno	Michel Sirotti	Alessandro Boulos	Leonardo Gontero	Sara Morandi	Anna Gislimberti	Chiara Limonta
XI.	2010	Turín	Stefano Ghisolfi	Leonardo Gontero	Michel Sirotti	Sara Morandi	Anna Gislimberti	Federica Mingolla
XII.	2011	Modena	Alessandro Santoni	Stefano Ghisolfi	Leonardo Gontero	Claudia Ghisolfi	Michela Facci	Chiara Rogora
XIII.	2012	Arco	Leonardo Gontero	Alessandro Santoni	Michel Sirotti	Chiara Rogora	Sara Morandi	Michela Facci
XIV.	2013	Turín	Leonardo Gontero	Alessandro Santoni	Stanislao Zama	Sara Morandi	Martina Zanetti	Asja Gollo
XV.	2014	Arco	Leonardo Gontero	Alessandro Santoni	Ludovico Fossali	Giulia Fossali	Silvia Porta	Martina Zanetti
XVI.	2015	Bolzano	Leonardo Gontero	Alessandro Santoni	Gian Luca Zodda	Silvia Porta	Elisabetta Dalla Brida	Giulia Fossali
XVII.	2016	Bolzano	Leonardo Gontero	Ludovico Fossali	Gian Luca Zodda	Elisabetta Dalla Brida	Giorgia Strazieri	Silvia Porta
XVIII.	2017	Arco	Ludovico Fossali	Leonardo Gontero	Gian Luca Zodda	Giorgia Strazieri	Martina Zanetti	Sara Morandi
XIX.	2018	Campitello di Fassa	Leonardo Gontero	Gian Luca Zodda	Ludovico Fossali	Elisabetta Dalla Brida	Anna Calanca	Erica Piscopo

== Bouldering ==
	Year	Location	Men			Women		
	Year	Location	Gold	Silver	Bronze	Gold	Silver	Bronze
I.	2000	Turín	Flavio Crespi	Riccardo Scarian	Lucio Giudici	Giulia Giammarco	Jenny Lavarda	Valentina Garavini
II.	2001	Campitello di Fassa	Riccardo Scarian	Flavio Crespi	Christian Core	Giulia Giammarco	Lisa Benetti	Stella Marchisio
III.	2002	Rome	Christian Core	Luca Giupponi	Luca Parisse	Giulia Giammarco	Stella Marchisio	Stefania De Grandi
IV.	2003	Campitello di Fassa	Gabriele Moroni	Georgos Progulakis	Christian Core	Giulia Giammarco	Giovanna Pozzoli	Jenny Lavarda
V.	2004	Aprica	Christian Core	Michele Caminati	Flavio Crespi	Jenny Lavarda	Stefania De Grandi	Stella Marchisio
VI.	2005	Terst	Christian Core	Stefano Ghidini	Flavio Crespi	Stefania De Grandi	Stella Marchisio	Lisa Benetti
VII.	2006	Rome	Christian Core	Lucas Preti	Flavio Crespi	Roberta Longo	Sara Morandi	Claudia Battaglia
VIII.	2007	San Martino di Castrozza	Gabriele Moroni	Christian Core	Lucas Preti	Stella Marchisio	Cassandra Zampar	Roberta Longo
IX.	2008	Terst	Michele Caminati	Lucas Preti	Gabriele Moroni	Anna Gislimberti	Roberta Longo	Jenny Lavarda
X.	2009	Turín	Lucas Preti	Christian Core	Marcello Bombardi	Jenny Lavarda	Elena Chiappa	Alexandra Ladurner
XI.	2010	Modena	Jacopo Larcher	Niccolò Ceria	Stefano Ghisolfi	Alexandra Ladurner	Elena Chiappa	Giada Zampa
XII.	2011	Modena	Christian Core	Michele Caminati	Stefano Bettoli	Claudia Ghisolfi	Giada Zampa	Annalisa De Marco
XIII.	2012	Modena	Christian Core	Pietro Vangi	Francesco Vettorata	Giada Zampa	Alice Gianelli	Sara Morandi
XIV.	2013	Modena	Michael Piccolruaz	Stefan Scarperi	Alessandro Zeni	Alexandra Ladurner	Jenny Lavarda	Annalisa De Marco
XV.	2014	Modena	Stefan Scarperi	Marcello Bombardi	Riccardo Piazza	Asja Gollo	Giorgia Tesio	Jenny Lavarda
XVI.	2015	Modena	Danilo Marchionne	Michael Piccolruaz	Alessandro Palma	Laura Rogora	Giorgia Tesio	Andrea Ebner
XVI.	2016	Modena	Gabriele Moroni	Marcello Bombardi	Francesco Vettorata	Laura Rogora	Annalisa De Marco	Andrea Ebner
XVII.	2017	Modena	Gabriele Moroni	Marcello Bombardi	Francesco Vettorata	Laura Rogora	Annalisa De Marco	Andrea Ebner
