= Chocón Machacas =

Nature reserve in eastern Guatemala

Chocón Machacas Protected Biotope
- IUCN category IV (habitat/species management area)
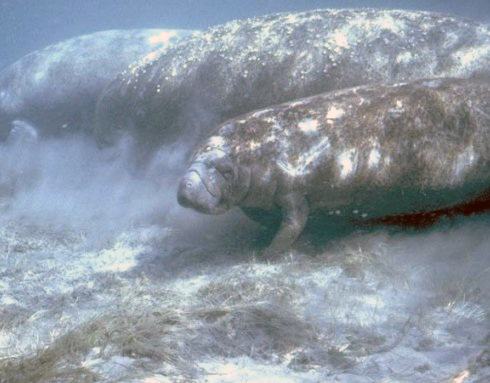
- The reserve has a Caribbean manatee population
- Interactive map of Chocón Machacas; Protected Biotope
- Location: Izabal, Guatemala
- Coordinates: 15°46′N 88°53′W
- Area: 62.65 km^{2} (24.19 sq mi)
- Established: Decreto Legislativo 4-89
- Visitors: allowed
- Operator: CECON / USAC

The Chocón Machacas Protected Biotope is a protected nature reserve in eastern Guatemala. It is located in the municipality of Livingston, in a densely forested area covering the lower reaches of the Chocón Machacas River basin and the northern shores of the Río Dulce-Golfete Dulce system (15.755464°N 88.873243°W).

The Chocón Machacas river and Golfete Dulce complex form one of Guatemala's few remaining habitats for the endangered Caribbean manatee (Trichechus manatus).
