= Santo Tomás de Castilla =

- city
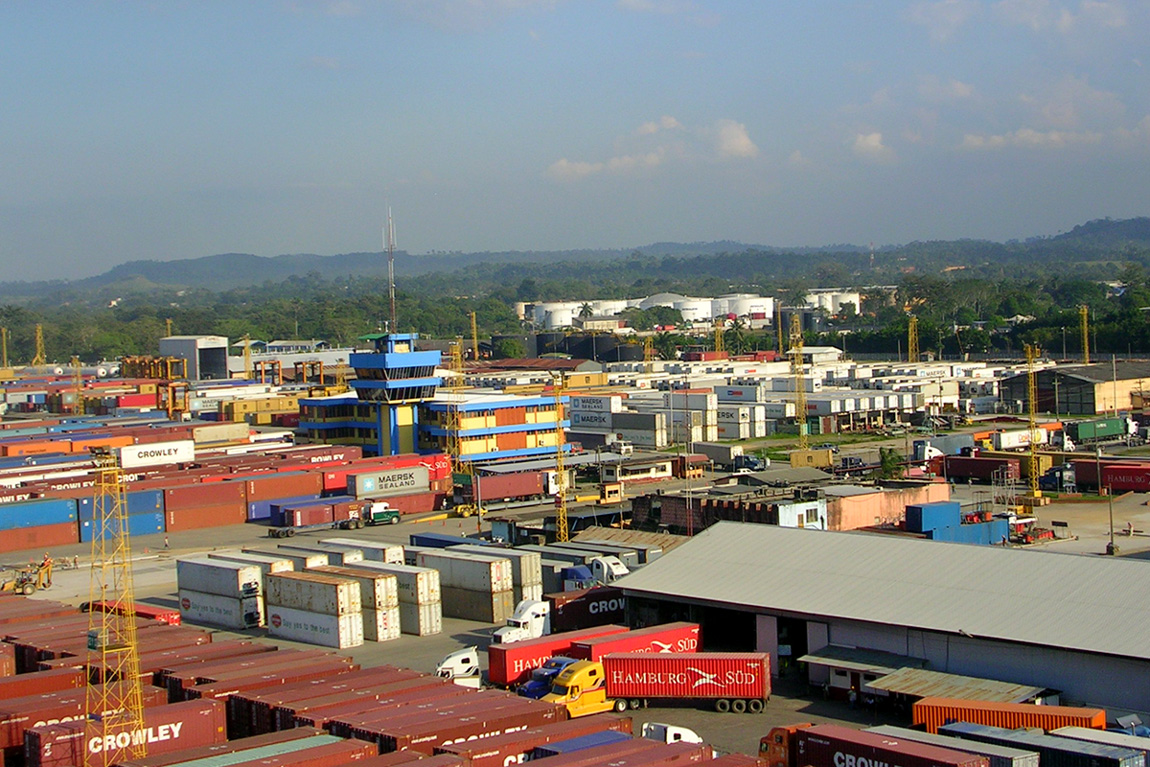
- View of the city's container port

- Location within Guatemala
- Coordinates: 15°41′20″N 88°36′45″W
- Country: Guatemala
- Department: Izabal
- Municipality: Puerto Barrios
- Founded: 1604

Population (2022)
  - Total: 20,000
- Climate: Af

Santo Tomás de Castilla, officially known as Mátías de Gálvez though it popularly retains its former name, is a port city in the Izabal Department, Guatemala. It lies at Amatique Bay off the Gulf of Honduras and is administratively a part of Puerto Barrios.

== Belgian colony ==
In the 1840s Santo Tomás was settled by Belgium in a colonial enterprise after the European nation supported Rafael Carrera in his drive for independence of the country. The territory was authorized in 1843 "in perpetuity" by the Guatemalan Parliament to be administered by the Compagnie belge de colonisation, a private Belgian company under the protection of King Leopold I of Belgium. It replaced the failed British Eastern Coast of Central America Commercial and Agricultural Company. Many of the Belgians who settled there died of yellow fever and malaria, which were endemic to the region. Most were buried in a Belgian cemetery near Santa Tomás. In 1854, the Belgian company withdrew because of financial losses.

Belgian colonization company in 1844

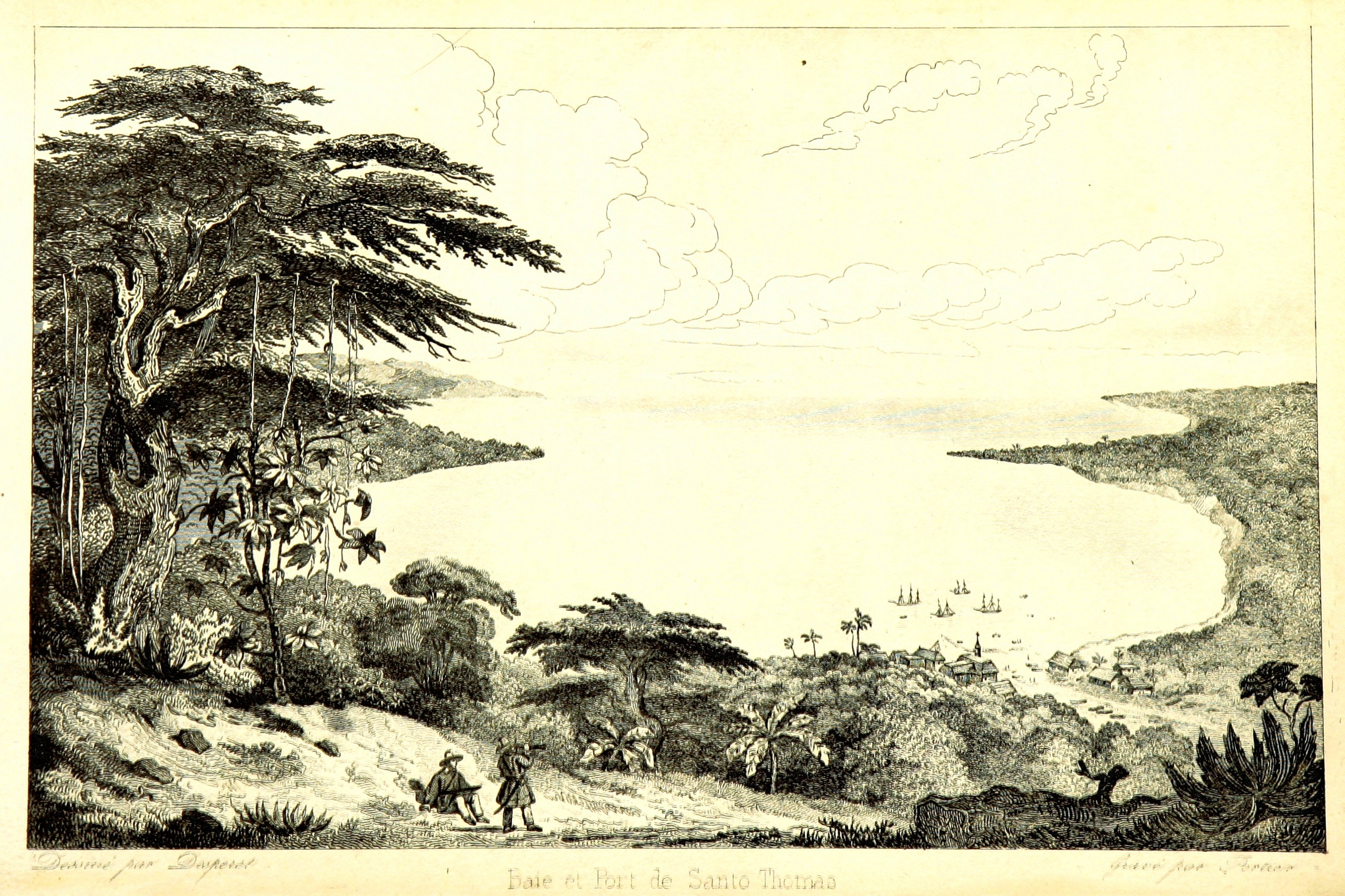
Santo Tomás de Castilla bay

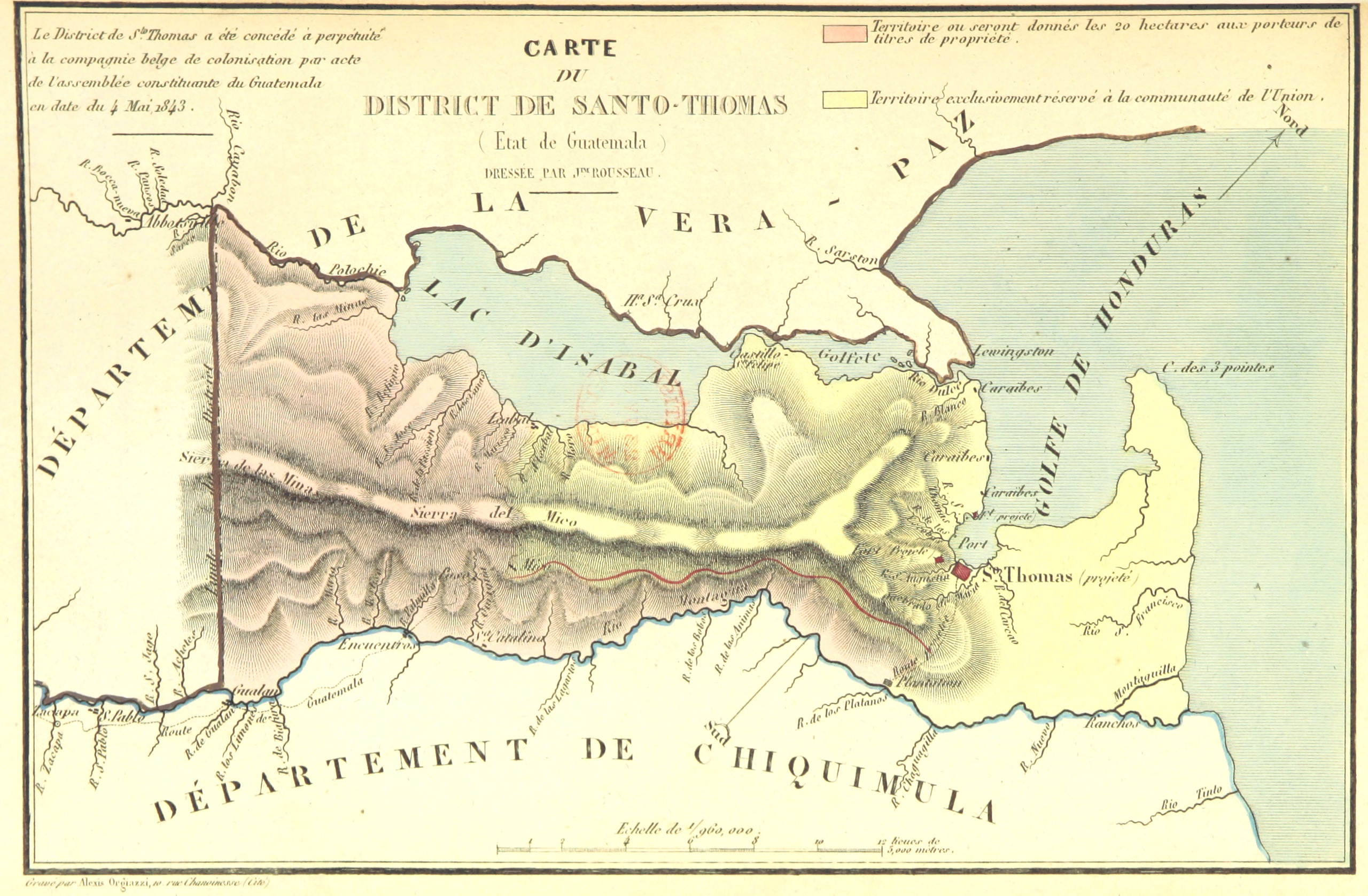
Izabal lake and Santo Tomás district. The aea in yellow is what had been given in perpetuity to the Catholic Belgians by Carrera's regime.

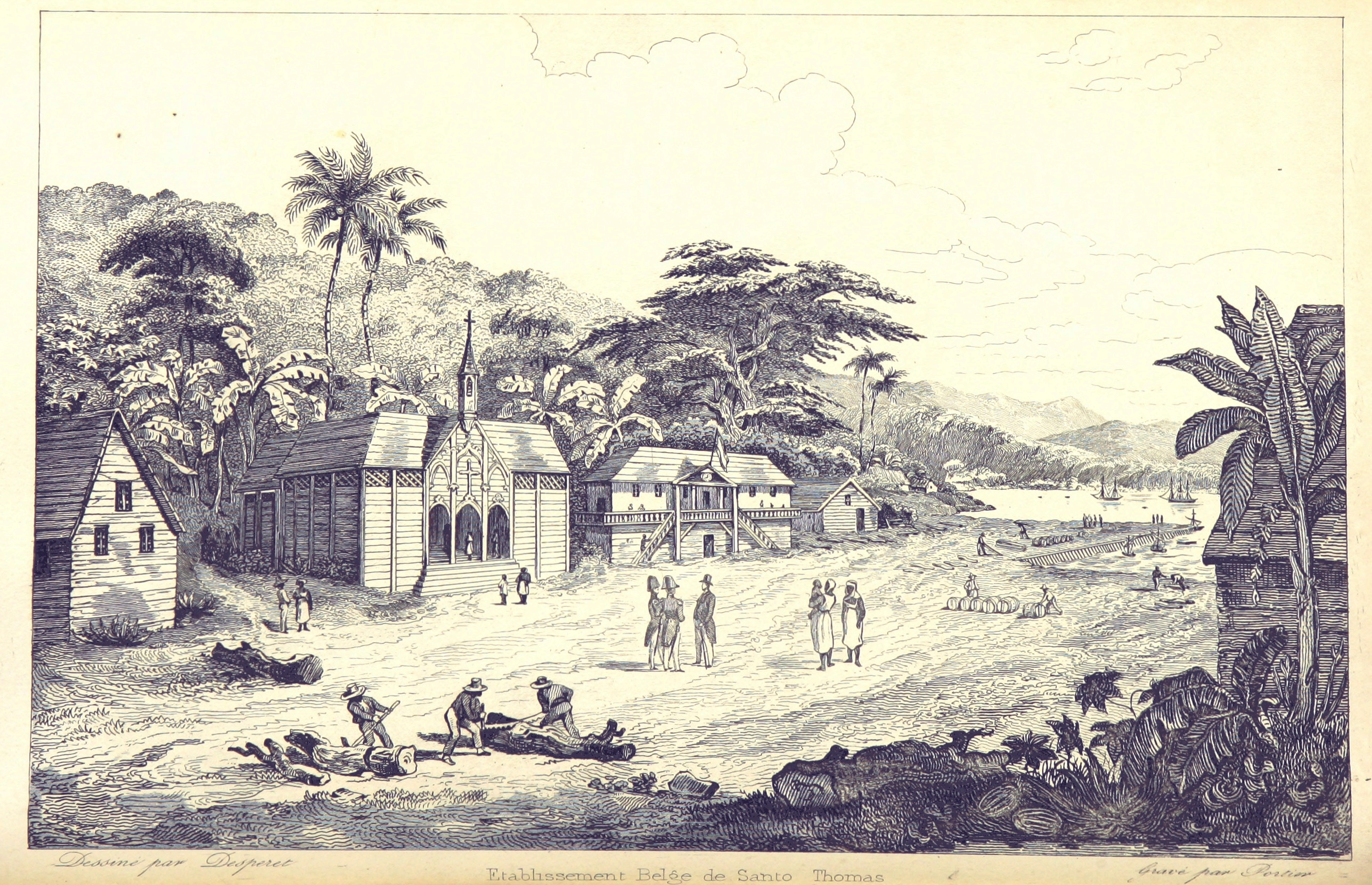
Santo Tomás town

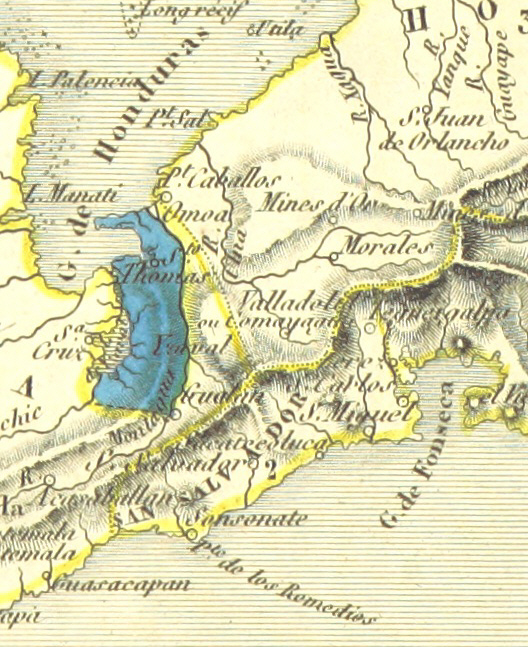
Map of the Belgian colony in Guatemala.

Maps and drawings made by Belgians. One of the descendent of the first settlers from 1844 is Oscar Berger Perdomo, who was President of Guatemala between 2004 and 2008.

== After 1960 ==
In the early 1960s the port, which has been officially renamed Matías de Gálvez in 1958, became the primary base for the new Guatemalan Navy. Admiral Manuel Sosa Avila, of the Navy of Guatemala, was the first port commander for the newly founded Navy, which consisted of a frigate and two fast attack boats. The fast attack boats were donated to Guatemala by the United States. The frigate was purchased by the government of Guatemala in Sweden. The purchase was conducted by Ian Moon, an Irishman who was the son-in-law of the then-President of Guatemala Idigoras Fuentes. The frigate was delivered to Guatemala by a Swedish crew.

Eventually, the frigate was scuttled by the Guatemalan Navy near Puerto Barrios, in shallow water, where the ship's structure can still be seen there today by ships passing by. The frigate was scuttled by Francisco Sigui Lira, an officer of the Guatemalan Navy. A highway connects the port with Guatemala City, and it is also served by a railroad, which was originally built by the Banana Fruit Company. Due to lack of funds for maintenance, Guatemala did not operate the railroad for many years. It briefly operated again in 2006 with American financing, but due to conflicts with its administration, the American capital investors abandoned the project.

== Seaport ==
The seaport of the city was built in 1976, after an earthquake had severely damaged the port of Puerto Barrios. Today it is among the busiest in Central America and currently expanding. The port is located next to a free trade zone, the Zona de Libre Industria y Comercio Santo Tomás de Castilla, called Zolic. The port currently employs 2,100 workers. In 2004, 4.56 million tons of trading goods went through the port from 1,372 ships.

== Cruise industry ==
In 2004, a cruise ship terminal was completed and Santo Tomás de Castilla started receiving cruise ships. The cruise ship terminal has been a tremendous boost for the Guatemalan tourism industry. Four cruise ships a month, carrying 1,500 passengers each, make a stop here. Cruise ship passengers visit Guatemala chiefly for its Mayan culture, which sites are located throughout the country. Puerto Barrios Airport is being refurbished in order to handle small planes to transport ship passengers for day trips to Tikal or other places in Guatemala. Nearby attractions include Rio Dulce, Lake Izabal, the towns of Puerto Barrios, Livingston and San Felipe Castle, and the Mayan ruins of Quirigua.

== See also ==
- Ferrovias Guatemala

== Bibliography ==
- Compagnie Belge de Colonisation (1844). "Colonisation du district de Santo-Thomas de Guatemala par la Communauté de l'Union". Collection de renseignements publiés ou recueillis par la Compagnie (in French). Original held and digitised by the British Library.
