= Ak'tenamit =

Ak'Tenamit, which means "New Village' in the Q'eqchi' language, is a development project in Eastern Guatemala on the Dulce River. The project includes a school, Healthcare clinic and, community and gender development. Its counterpart in the United States is the fund-raising arm, The Guatemalan Tomorrow Fund, Inc. The project was established in 1991 by Steve Dudenhoefer who continues as the Technical Advisor. The Healthcare clinic treats about seven to eight thousand patients per year, while the school includes grades 7 through 12. In 2009 there are 600 students enrolled in the program.
