= A.D. Torino =

Salvadoran football club

- Full name: Asociación Deportivas Torino
- Founded: 2019
- Ground: Cancha Rogelio Barrera; Turín, Ahuachapán, El Salvador
- Manager: (El Salvador) Rafael Tobar
- League: Tercera División
Home colours

Asociación Deportivas Torino is a Salvadoran professional football club based in Turín, Ahuachapán, El Salvador.

The club currently plays in the Tercera Division de Fútbol Salvadoreño after receiving a spot based on their performance in the ADFA.

The club announced on August, 2024 due to the high cost and minimal Financial support, the club would withdraw from the Tercera Division.

== Honours ==
=== Domestic honours ===
==== Leagues ====
- Tercera División de Fútbol Salvadoreño and predecessors
  - Champions (2) : N/A
  - Play-off winner (2):
- La Asociación Departamental de Fútbol Aficionado' and predecessors (4th tier)
  - Champions - Ahuachapan Department (1) : 2022-23
  - Play-off winner (2):

== Current squad ==
Note: Flags indicate national team as defined under FIFA eligibility rules; some limited exceptions apply. Players may hold more than one non-FIFA nationality.

No.	Pos.	Nation	Player
—		SLV	Rony Aguilar
—		SLV	
—		SLV	
—		SLV	

No.	Pos.	Nation	Player
—		SLV	
—		SLV	
—		SLV	

== List of coaches ==
- (El Salvador)
- (El Salvador) Rafael Tobar (December 2023-August 2024)
- Hiatus (August 2024 - Present)
