= Open Windows Foundation =

American-based Guatemala non-profit

- Formation: 2001
- Type: Nonprofit organization
- Headquarters: Tempe, AZ, United States
- Revenue: $144,287 (2016)
- Expenses: $135,516 (2016)
- Website: www.openwindowsfoundation.com

Open Windows Foundation is a US-registered 501(c)(3) non-profit organization focusing on youth education and programming in San Miguel Dueñas, Guatemala. The center was founded in 2001 by Ericka Kaplan, Jean Uelmen, and Teresa Quiñonez and now serves over 1,000 members of the Dueñas community. Its programs include an after-school program, a computer center, and a scholarship program that has sponsored more than 400 students to attend high school.

== Mission ==
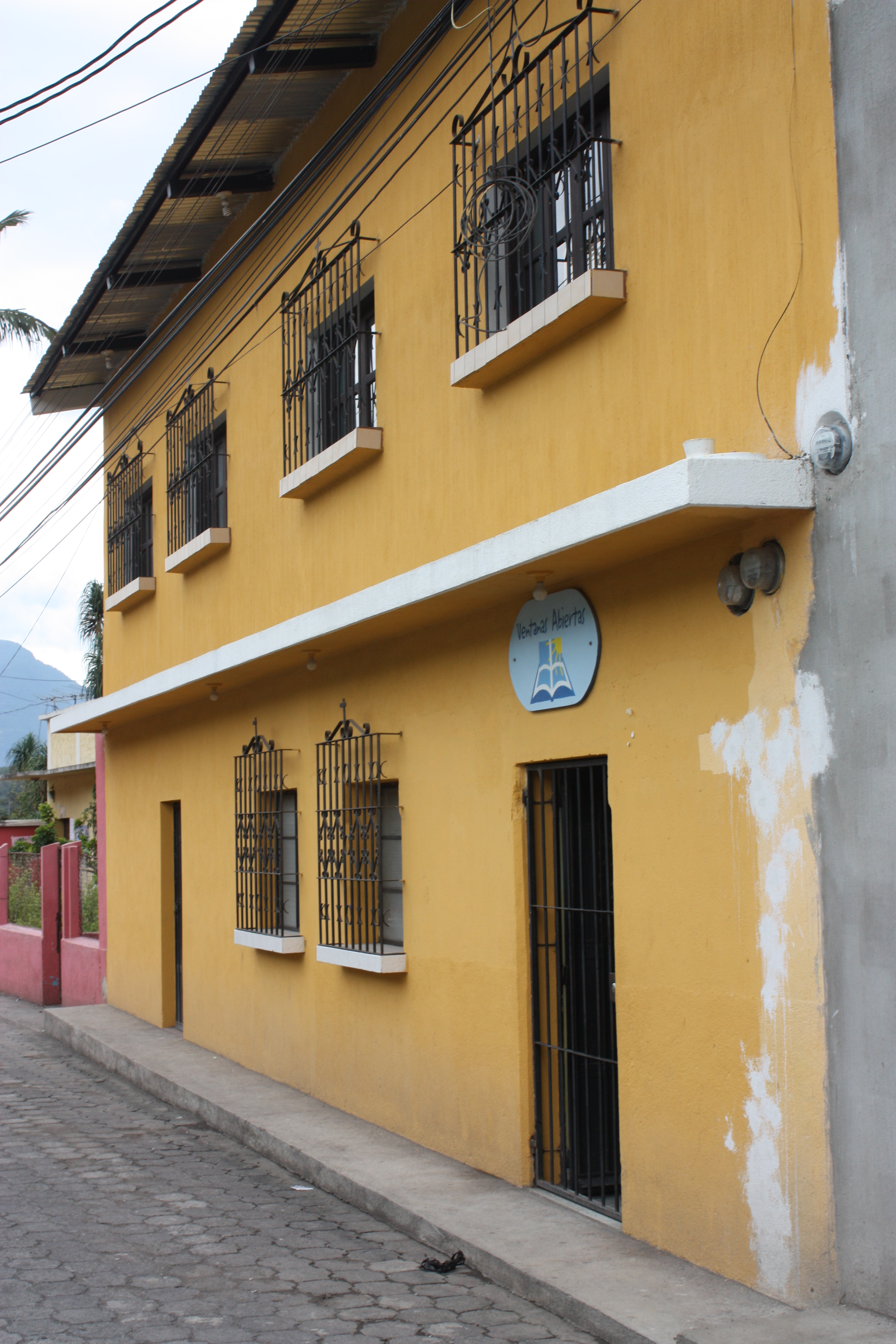
Facade of Open Windows

To provide education and community development opportunities for children and families in Guatemala.

== History ==
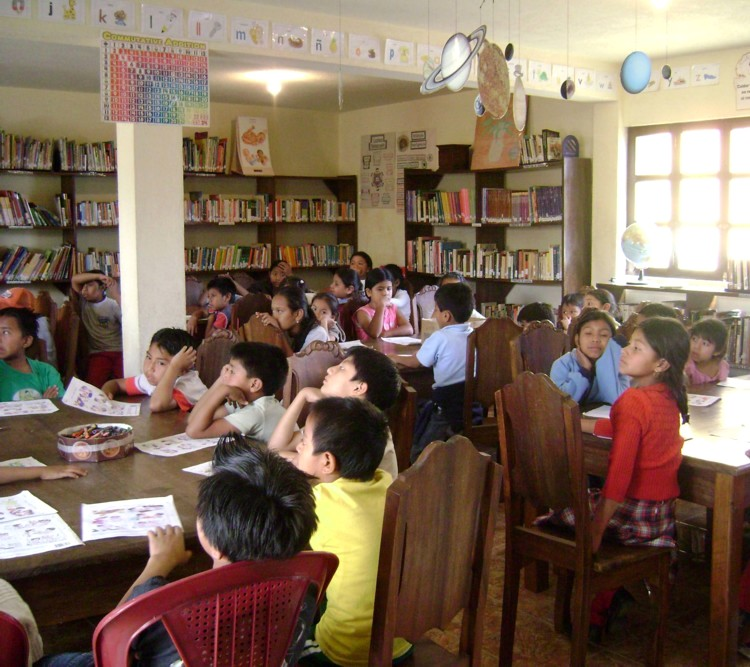
The library room with over 15,000 books.

The Foundation first opened in 2001 with an enrollment of 20 children assembling in a small room. The original 300 books for the center were donated from a library project that had recently closed in Rio Dulce, Guatemala. The Foundation’s primary function was to act as a dynamic library with the aim of getting kids to read for pleasure.

Over the years, Open Windows has continued to accumulate students, books, funds, and other resources through the personal networking of the founders and the community. In 2003, Rotary International donated 10 computers to Open Windows. This donation allowed Open Windows to expand its services by offering computer classes and by allowing students to use computers for homework. Open Windows also launched its initial website in 2003 which allowed for greater publicity.

In September 2005, a formal library room was built and is now filled with over 12,000 books including picture, fiction, non-fiction, and reference books. Two years later 2007, an impending donation from Rotary International for an additional 10 computers prompted the building of a second story computer center at Open Windows. The center was completed in April, 2007. By this time, the mission had been expanded to include enhancing technology skills and to provide educational programming and tutoring for students.

== Programs ==
Open Windows currently provides multiple programs: the after school program, the activities program, the computer center, a scholarship program, a pre-school introduction to learning, installation of eco-stoves and house construction.

=== After School Program ===
The after school program allows the students time to finish their homework with the supervision and assistance of the seven teachers at Open Windows Foundation. Because of the close relationship between Open Windows and the local schools, homework for the students is often designed with the specific resources of Open Windows in mind.

=== Activities Program ===
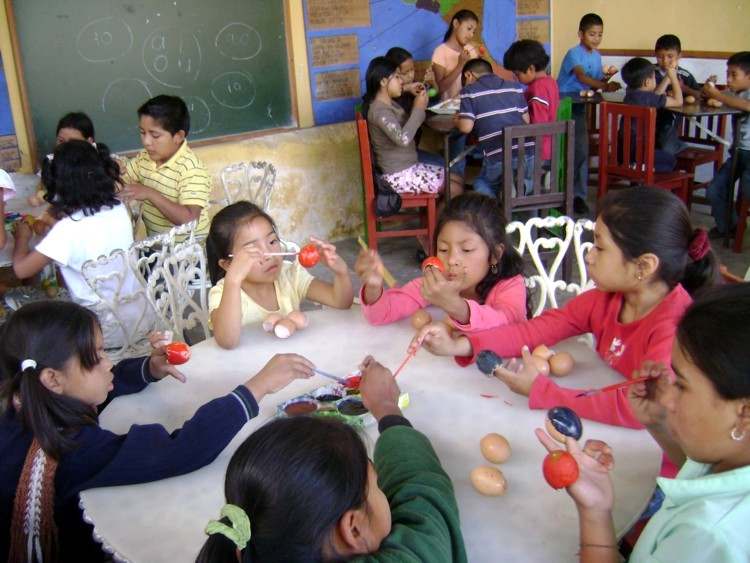
Activities Program

The activities program is designed for the students to participate in an interactive reading and learning activity as a group. Every afternoon the teachers at Open Windows Foundation use a book read aloud to ground an activity designed to emphasize reading, writing, creative, listening, and thinking skills.

=== Computer Center ===
The computer center was completed in 2007 and is composed of 20 computers donated from Rotary International. Classes are provided for children and adults and for various computer programs. In addition to the classes, 10 of the computers are now equipped with internet access for research and other educational purposes. The computer center is always in high demand as it provides the only public-access computers in the area.

=== Scholarship Program ===
Thanks to donations from Tom Sullivan, a scholarship program was set up in 2003 to enable motivated students from low-income families to go to high school. Most students in San Miguel Dueñas can not afford to attend high school because they do not have the money to pay for the tuition, books, and uniform costs. Unfortunately in Guatemala the government does not pay these costs. The scholarship program had three students in its first year, but Open Windows has since sponsored more than 400 scholarships. This year there are 30 scholarship students. The chosen, talented students are given funds to cover the costs of uniforms, books, and transportation. In return, they are asked to keep Open Windows informed of their progress. We find that high school graduates, in turn, help their brothers and sisters attend school. Open Windows also helps graduates in preparing for new job interviews, which includes writing a Curriculum Vitae. We hope to place these students in the local job market. In return, Open Windows scholarship students or family members take turns cleaning the library early each morning. In 2011, we started the community service program. During vacation the scholarship students come to the learning center to help small groups of primary children with math and reading skills. This, in turn, helps them learn to teach, work with others and speak in front of a group. Only $500 sends a scholarship recipient to high school for one year.

=== Pre-school Introduction to Learning ===
A more recent program involves five and six year-old children who are not enrolled in school but who started coming to the center wanting to learn. Open Windows' teachers began giving them basic instruction in reading and simple arithmetic and in time the number of youngsters attending grew. When the children participate in this program, the parents agree to send the children to school the following year.

=== Eco-stoves ===
Many Guatemalan families cook their meals on open fires inside their houses. This fills the houses with smoke and requires the families to spend a lot of time or a lot of money obtaining firewood. Eco-stoves reduce the wood required for cooking by about two-thirds and they send the smoke out of the house through a chimney. Open Windows, in alliance with the Canadian organization Developing World Connections, installs new eco-stoves in homes all around San Miguel Dueñas, saving families money and health problems.

=== House Construction ===
Again in collaboration with Developing World Connections, Open Windows builds houses for families in the area. While many families live in homes made of sheet metal with a dirt floor, these new houses are made of concrete blocks and have cement floors, which allow the families to keep them much cleaner. Volunteers work with masons hired by Open Windows to construct one-, two- or three-room houses, which represent a major improvement in the lives of the families.
