= International Railways of Central America =

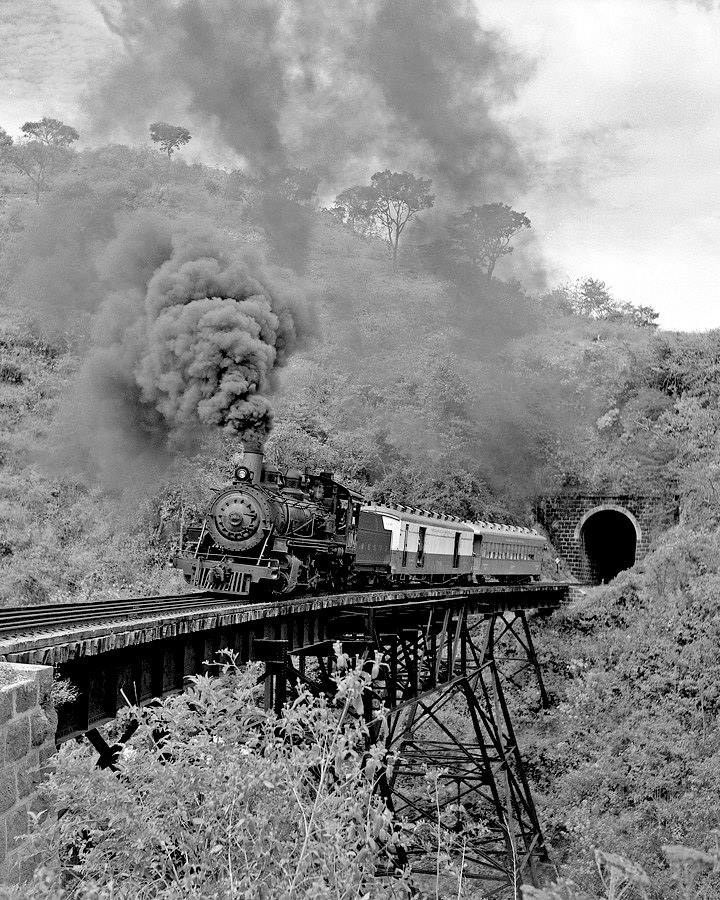
- Industry: Rail transport
- Founded: 1904
- Founder: Minor Cooper Keith
- Defunct: 1974
- Fate: Nationalized and merged
- Successor: FEGUA; FENADESAL
- Divisions: Guatemala; El Salvador

The International Railways of Central America (IRCA) (Spanish: FFCC Internacionales de Centro America, FICA) was a U.S. based company founded by Minor C. Keith and incorporated in New Jersey in 1904 which operated a large network of 3 ft (914 mm) narrow gauge railways in Guatemala and El Salvador, it became a subsidiary of the United Fruit company in 1936. The IRCA's Guatemalan division was nationalized in 1968, becoming the Ferrocarriles de Guatemala (FEGUA), and the El Salvadorian division was merged with the Ferrocarril de El Salvador (FES) to form the Ferrocarriles Nacionales de El Salvador (FENADESAL) in 1975.

== History ==
=== Formation and expansion ===
Minor C. Keith first purchased the Guatemala Central, and Guatemala Railway companies in 1904, but despite incorporating the IRCA the railways continued to operate independently until 1912 when in April the Guatemala Central was merged with the Ocos Railroad, the Occidental de Guatemala Railroad was also acquired but continued as a separate property. The IRCA also began constructing a line from La Union to San Miguel in El Salvador also in 1912. The company would also acquire the Central El Salvadorian Railway in 1912.

In 1929 the IRCA completed a connection to El Salvador via Zacapa in Guatemala by which time the network spanned over 800 miles (1287 km), the IRCA also had connections to the El Salvador Railway Co Ltd at San Salvador, and a connection with the standard-gauge National Railways of Mexico (N de M) initially via ferry at Ayutla, and later a bridge built during World War II. The rail connection between San Salvador and Puerto Barrios cut the time for Salvadoran goods to reach U.S. significantly (from 15 days to reach San Francisco by ship to 5.5 days to reach New Orleans by rail and freighter). Keith had envisioned the IRCA would reach as far as Panama, connecting the North and South American continents, however the network would never go beyond La Union.

=== United Fruit control ===
In the 1920s United Fruit's affiliation with the IRCA was abundantly clear, often to the disadvantage of local banana growers who had to pay almost twenty times the rates United Fruit had to, to ship their produce.

By 1933 the IRCA was almost bankrupt, it could no longer precure funding for further expansion in El Salvador due to the Great Depression, furthermore the United Fruit company had made an agreement with the Guatemalan government to build a new port at Concepcion del Mar, with ships using the Panama canal which effectively usurped the IRCA. However the IRCA managed to convince the United Fruit company that rail transport would be more efficient as well as pressuring dictator Jorge Ubico, and in 1936 the United Fruit company paid-off $2.6 million worth of debt, and gained significant shares in IRCA (42.6% ownership) effectively making it a subsidiary. In 1950 the IRCA received its first diesel locomotives built by General Electric.

Although United Fruit's financial aid had saved the IRCA from bankruptcy, United Fruit's stake in the IRCA ensured the two were associated with each other, saddling the IRCA with the same negative reputation that United Fruit had locally. Relations between the IRCA and United Fruit became cordial by 1949 when the IRCA sued United Fruit in February with the New York Supreme Court siding with the IRCA, and United Fruit was ordered to pay $4.5 million before 1956, in March 1961 this was raised to an additional $4 million by a supplemental judgement by the New York Court of Appeals, the IRCA also had to increase freight rates and was recommended by the court to eventually terminate the contracts with United Fruit.

=== Decline ===
By 1961 United Fruit no-longer had control of the IRCA as result of a 1958 agreement which has resulted from the 1954 anti-trust sue by the U.S. department of Justice against United Fruit, this caused further legal cases against United Brands (formerly United Fruit). 1957 was the last profitable year for the IRCA, as the opening of the Atlantic highway from Guatemala City to Puerto Barrios forced lower freight rates to compete with trucks, and the closure of United Fruit's vast Tiquisate plantation in 1964 which accounted for roughly 10% of the IRCA's annual revenue forced the IRCA into terminal decline. In 1965 IRCA was no longer listed on the New York stock-exchange. In October 1961 the Transportation Corporation of America (TCA) under the controversial O. Roy Chalk bought majority ownership in the IRCA, little changed physically. In 1965 Chalk sued United Brands for anti-trust and contract violations with damages totaling $507 million, however in April 1966 Chalk sold his interest in the IRCA and abandoned the lawsuit against United Brands.

By 1967 the IRCA was unable to pay its employees resulting in the Guatemalan government providing loans to the railway company, however by the end of 1967 the IRCA had defaulted on its loans and still owed over $800,000 to workers with only around $111,000 in its account. As a result of defaulting on its loans the Guatemalan government foreclosed on 27 December 1968 resulting in the Guatemalan division becoming nationalized, forming the Ferrocarriles de Guatemala (FEGUA). Most diesel locomotives were transferred to the El Salvadorian division which continued to be profitable, while FEGUA began reactivating stored steam locomotives. In 1975 the IRCA merged with the Ferrocarril de El Salvador (FES), forming the current Ferrocarriles Nacionales de El Salvador (FENADESAL).

== Route ==
By 1912 the network went north from Guatemala City to the port of Puerto Barrios, known as the Northern Railroad of Guatemala which originally opened in 1896; with another later built line looping round to Corozo. Going south from Guatemala City the line stretched to the port of San Jose with a junction at Escuintla with another line going west terminating at the port of Champerico, along this line there are spur lines to San Antonio Palopó and San Felipe from Muluá. A further line comes off the Escuintla - Champerico line running to the border at Tecún Umán in Ayutla with the section between Ayutla and Vado Ancho built first before being connected with the rest of the network at a junction at Las Cruces down from Retalhuleu. From the line to San Jose a small branch was later constructed to Puerto Quetzal. By 1918 the line from Ayutla to Ocos was under complete IRCA control.

The line running from Guatemala into El Salvador began with a junction at Zacapa, with line running to Anguiatu at the border, then Metapan before branching in two at Texis Junction (near Texistepeque) with one line leading to Santa Ana and then from Santa Ana to Chalchuapa, and Atiquizaya before terminating at Ahuachapan. The line continued in the other direction from Texis Junction east to San Salvador running onwards to San Vicente and then to Zacatecoluca, and Usulutan before going on to the San Miguel to La Union port section which was built first and was the furthest extent of the IRCA.

In addition to the connection with the N de M at Ayutla, the IRCA also connected with the 44 km standard gauge electric railway, the Ferrocarril de Los Altos (FLA, later Ferrocarril Nacional de Los Altos, FNLA) at San Felipe which ran to Quetzaltenango in the western highlands of Guatemala which operated between 1928 and 1933. In El Salvador the IRCA connected with the El Salvador Railway Co Ltd at Santa Ana, Apopa, and San Salvador at which the IRCA also connected with the railway running to Santa Tecla which closed in 1929, both these railways were the same 3 ft narrow gauge as the IRCA. A line was built to Tiquisate from the Escuintla - Champerico line to serve the large United Fruit company banana plantation there in 1936, this was closed in 1964.

== Operations ==
=== Rolling stock ===
The majority of the locomotives inherited by the IRCA in 1912 were manufactured by the Baldwin Locomotive Works (BLW) of Philadelphia, and in 1913 the IRCA placed their first order of new locomotives for five 2-8-0 tender engines numbered 32 to 36 and were a standard BLW design, the 10-26E class, another five were ordered in 1914 and numbered 37, and 45 to 48, they were later converted to burn oil, similar locomotives were ordered again in 1925 and 1926.

From 1950 the IRCA ordered several diesel locomotives from General Electric, most were reallocated to El Salvador after 1968 where they remained in service past merger and nationalization, however in Guatemala most were abandoned in favour of older steam locomotives as diesel spares became to expensive to precure post-nationalization.

== Legacy ==
The IRCA was the largest rail network in both Guatemala and El Salvador by trackage and quite ambitious in its early attempts at expansion, however its association and reliance on the United Fruit company would ultimately hamper it and lead the IRCA's decline. The IRCA's infrastructure would form the basis for the national railway networks of both Guatemala and El Salvador.

=== Preservation ===
Twelve ex-IRCA steam locomotives remain in various conditions in Guatemala; and in El Salvador, all but one of the country's six remaining steam locomotives are ex-IRCA locos, three of which are on display.

== See also ==
- History of Rail transport in Guatemala
- History of Rail transport in El Salvador
- Northern Railroad of Guatemala
- United Fruit Company
