= Rafael Tobar =

Salvadoran football player (born 1975)

José Rafael Tobar
Personal information
- Full name: José Rafael Tobar Lemus
- Date of birth: 24 November 1975 (age 50)
- Place of birth: Turín, Ahuachapán, El Salvador
- Height: 1.77 m (5 ft 10 in)
- Position: Defender

Team information
- Current team: Alacranes Del Norte

Youth career
- 1990–1992: Turín

Senior career*
Years	Team	Apps	(Gls)
1992–1995	Huracán		
1995	Once Lobos		
1996–2000	Luis Ángel Firpo		
2000–2006	FAS		
2007	Isidro Metapán		
2007	Luis Ángel Firpo	18	(1)
2008–2009	Juventud Independiente	28	(1)
2009–2010	Nejapa	8	(0)
2010–	Alacranes Del Norte	0	(0)

International career
1998–2005	El Salvador	7	(0)

Managerial career
- 2013: El Salvador (Assistant coach)
- 2014–2015: El Salvador under-17
- 2018: El Salvador under-17
- 2020: Municipal Limeno (Assistant coach)
- 2021: Isidro Metapan (Fitness coach)
- 2023: Atletico Balboa (Assistant coach)
- 2023–2024: Torino
- * Club domestic league appearances and goals

José Rafael Tobar Lemus (born 24 November 1975) is a Salvadoran football player who plays as defender for Alacranes Del Norte of El Salvador.

== Club career ==
Tobar started his career at hometown club Turín in the third division and joined Salvadoran second division side Huracán in 1992. After a short spell at Once Lobos he made his debut at the highest domestic level, the Primera División de Fútbol de El Salvador, with Luis Ángel Firpo in 1996 and in 1998 he won the league title with them. After two more championships, he left Firpo for rivals FAS for whom he debuted in November 2000 against Atlético Balboa and with whom he won five league titles. In December 2006 Tobar was put on the transfer list and finally moved to Isidro Metapán only to rejoin Firpo for a season. He then had spells at Juventud Independiente and Nejapa who were later renamed Alacranes Del Norte.

== International career ==
Tobar made his debut for El Salvador in a November 1998 friendly match against Honduras and has earned a total of 7 caps, scoring no goals. He has represented his country in 2 FIFA World Cup qualification matches and played at the 2005 UNCAF Nations Cup.

His final international game was an August 2005 friendly match against Paraguay.

== Honours ==
- Primera División de Fútbol de El Salvador: 8

1998/1999, 1999 Clausura, 2000 Clausura, 2002 Clausura, 2002 Apertura, 2003 Apertura, 2004 Apertura, 2005 Clausura

== Personal life ==
Rafael met and married Claudia Lisset Chinchilla de Tobar. On 30 September 2021, It was announced on social media that Claudia had died; no diagnosis was given.
