= Cecon =

Cecon may refer to:

- Cecon, a trade name for a Vitamin C drug

== People with the surname ==
- Andrea Cecon (born 1970), Italian Nordic combined skier
- Federico Cecon (born 1994), Italian ski jumper
- Roberto Cecon (born 1971), Italian ski jumper

== See also ==
- CECON (Centro de Estudios Conservacionistas, Center for Conservation Studies), a scientific research institute of the San Carlos University of Guatemala
