= Castle of San Felipe de Lara =

Spanish colonial fort in Guatemala

Castillo de San Felipe de Lara
- Izabal, Guatemala
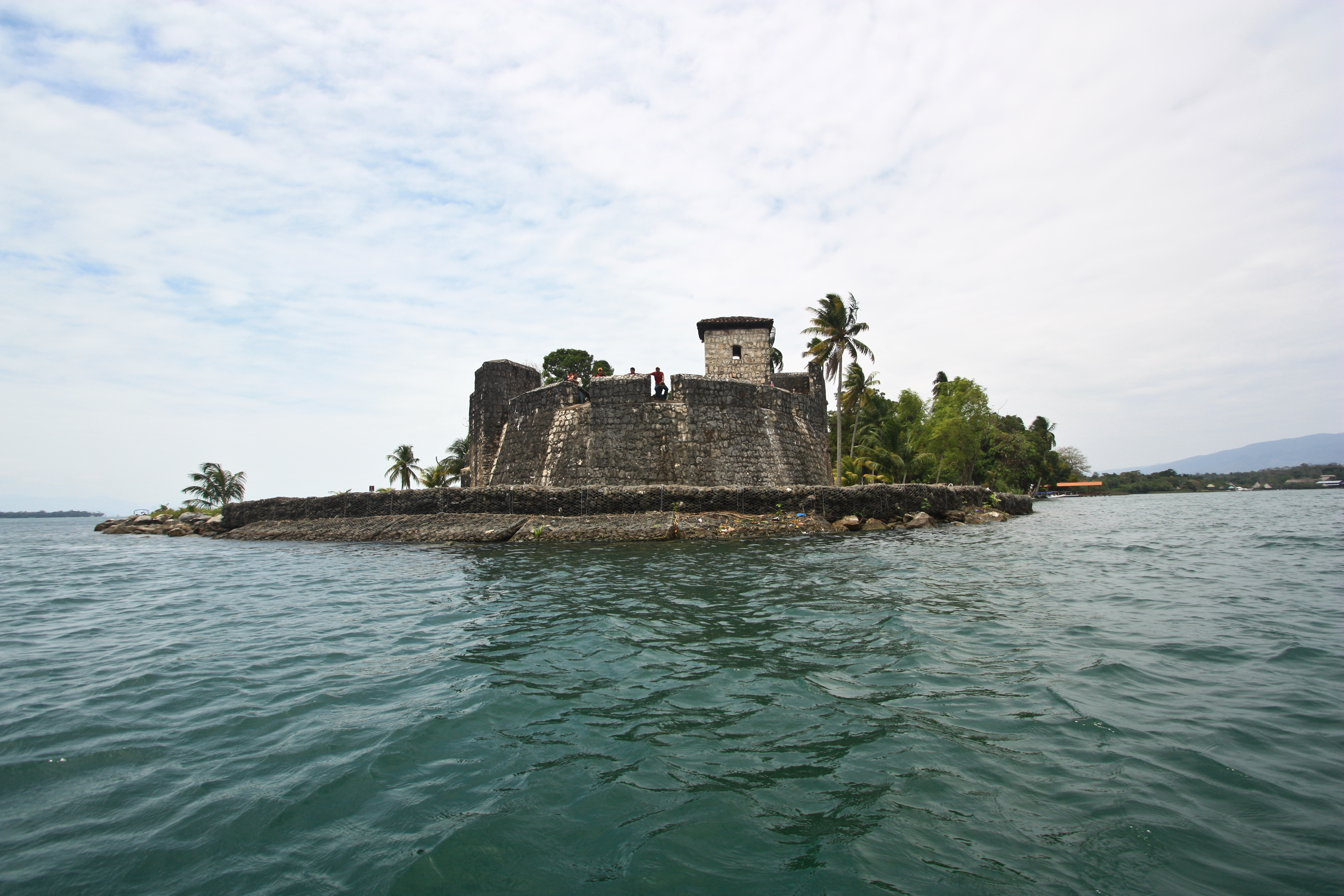

Site information
- Type: Redoubt
- Controlled by: INGUAT
- Open to the public: Yes
- Condition: Restored (1955)

Location
- Coordinates: 15.63742°N 88.99338°W

Site history
- Built: 1644
- Events: Piracy in the Caribbean

The Castle of San Felipe de Lara (Castillo de San Felipe de Lara) (often referred to simply as the Castillo de San Felipe) is a Spanish colonial fort at the entrance to Lake Izabal in eastern Guatemala. Lake Izabal is connected with the Caribbean Sea via the Dulce River and El Golfete lake. The fort was strategically situated at the narrowest point on the river. The Castillo de San Felipe was used by the Spanish for several centuries, during which time it was destroyed and looted several times by pirates.

The fort is listed on the UNESCO World Heritage Tentative List and is a popular regional tourist destination.

== Tourism and conservation ==
This site was added to the UNESCO World Heritage Tentative List on September 23, 2002 in the Cultural category. The fort is under the administrative care of the Guatemalan Institute of Tourism (INGUAT – Instituto Guatemalteco de Turismo). It is one of the most popular tourist destinations in the Río Dulce National Park. A significant increase in the number of visiting tourists was recorded in the period 2001–2003, over 90% of whom were Guatemalans. The figures for these period show a jump from 45,652 tourists in 2001 to just over 156,000 visitors in 2003.

The fort was badly damaged by an earthquake on 11 July 1999, suffering a number of cracks in its walls. The river water around the fort has been found to be heavily contaminated with coliform bacteria resulting from local pollution.

== History ==
San Felipe had continuous occupation from the Mesoamerican Middle Preclassic period (c.1000–400 BC) and was still inhabited when the Spanish first arrived in the region in the mid 16th century.

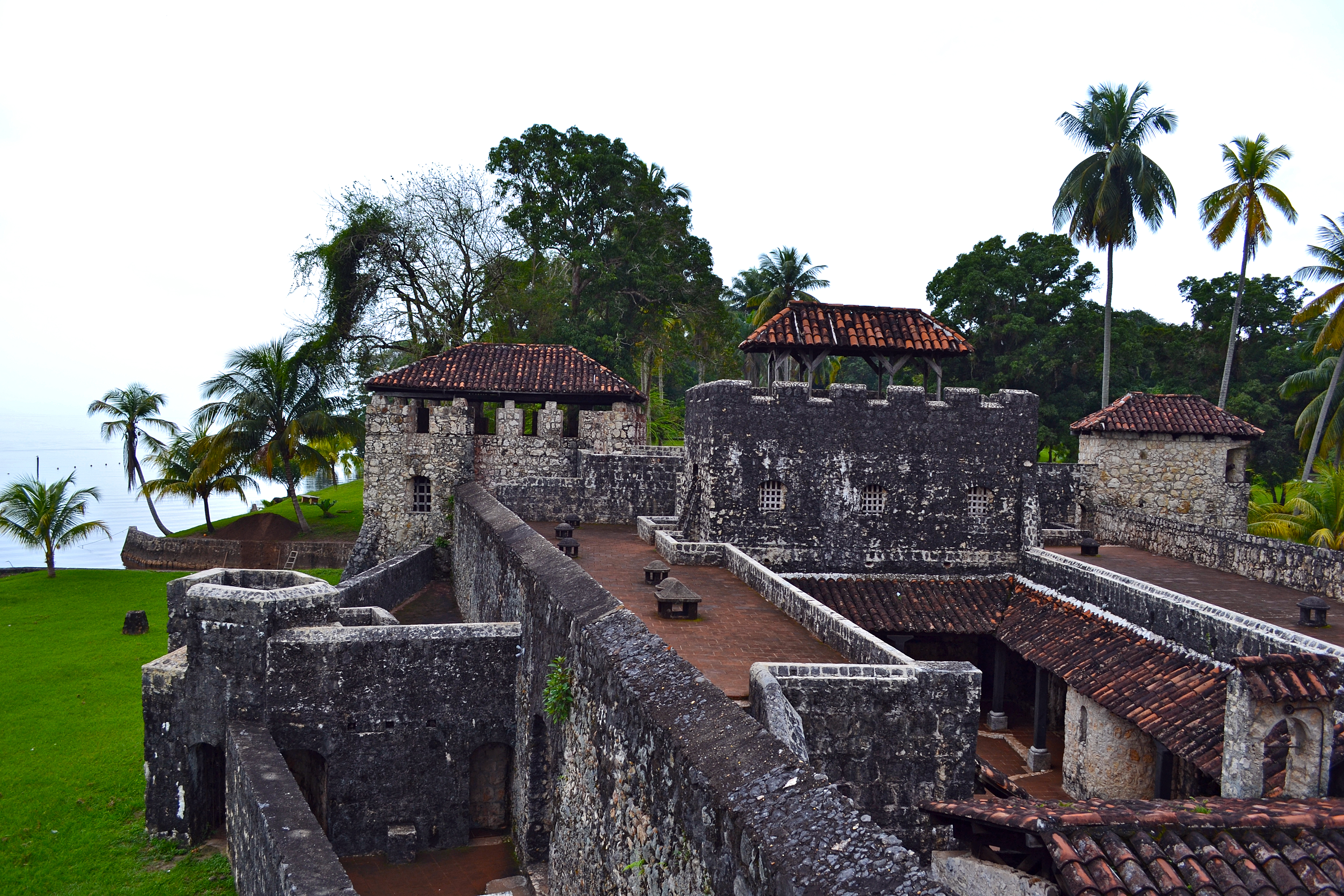
Castillo de San Felipe, Rio Dulce, Guatemala

The Castillo de San Felipe was built to protect the port of San Antonio de las Bodegas on the south shore of Lake Izabal from frequent pirate attacks, mostly by English pirates. After nightfall, passage along the river into the lake was blocked by a large chain that crossed from the fort to the far bank. San Antonio was the main port for receiving Spanish shipping carrying goods for the Captaincy General of Guatemala and was responsible for supplying and garrisoning the fort. Guatemalan records contain details of captains being appointed to the fort well into the 18th century. The position was a joint post, also including the position of mayor of San Pedro de Amatique and San Antonio de las Bodegas. The latter post was in name only, since the towns were soon abandoned due to constant slave raids by the Mosquito Zambo that left the Motagua delta and shores of Lake Izabal largely deserted, with those inhabitants that did not flee being sold into slavery in the British colony of Jamaica. A census taken in October 1776 recorded 122 inhabitants of San Felipe, all of whom were either Spanish or mixed race. In 1797 the garrison numbered 36 infantry.

=== Construction ===
A tower already existed on the site by 1604, when it is recorded as having been destroyed. The fort was built in 1644 under the orders of Diego de Avendaño, then governor of the Kingdom of Guatemala. At the time it was known as Fuerte Bustamente ("Bustamente Fort") and the Torreón de Defensa ("Defence Tower"). The design of the walls was modified by the oidor (high judge) Lara y Mogrovejo, from whom it gained the "de Lara" part of its name. It was rebuilt in 1651 under orders of Lara y Mogrovejo. The fort was redesigned in 1687 by Diego Gómez de Ocampo in the style of the French military architect Sébastien Le Prestre de Vauban. The modified design was implemented in 1689. Three bastions were functioning by 1697 (Nuestra Señora de Concepción, Nuestra Señora de Regla and the San Felipe Keep).

Additional fortifications were designed by engineer José Sierra and added in 1797; they included three artillery batteries known as the batteries of San Carlos, San Felipe and Santiago. Two barracks were also added (Buenavista and Santiago).

== Layout ==
The fort consists of a semicircular bastion enclosed behind two converging outer walls, each terminating in a roughly square tower. The fort has three storeys. The land approach to the fort was protected by a moat with drawbridge.
