= ZOLIC =

Free trade zone of Guatemala

ZOLIC (Spanish: Zona Libre de Industria y Comercio) is Guatemalas´ free trade zone for industry and commerce. It is located next to the seaport of Santo Tomás de Castilla in the department of Izabal. It is a logistics and operations centre for international trade and went into service in 1981. The area comprises 22.000 m^{2} of stockroom and 53.000 m^{2} of open terrain.
