= Lilian Mercedes Letona =

Salvadoran guerrilla and revolutionary

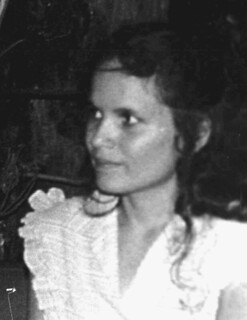
- Born: September 24, 1954; Turín, El Salvador
- Died: August 1, 1983 (aged 28) ? (El Salvador)
- Occupations: Guerrilla, Political activist
- Years active: 1972–1983

External image
- A picture of Lilian Mercedes Letona

Lilian Mercedes Letona (September 24, 1954 – August 1, 1983), was a Salvadoran guerrilla and communist revolutionary, member of the Farabundo Martí National Liberation Front (FMLN). Also known with her "nom de guerre" Comandante Clelia (Commander Clelia), she took part in the Salvadoran Civil War.

== Biography ==
Born in 1954 in Turín, a town located in the Ahuachapán Department, she was the daughter of a school teacher and a small tradeswoman. Graduated in 1972 in painting, she was member of a student movement before to join the Ejército Revolucionario del Pueblo (ERP - People's Revolutionary Army), while promoting the incorporation of her sister Mercedes del Carmen Letona (nom de guerre Comandante Luisa) who later became a responsible of Radio Venceremos.

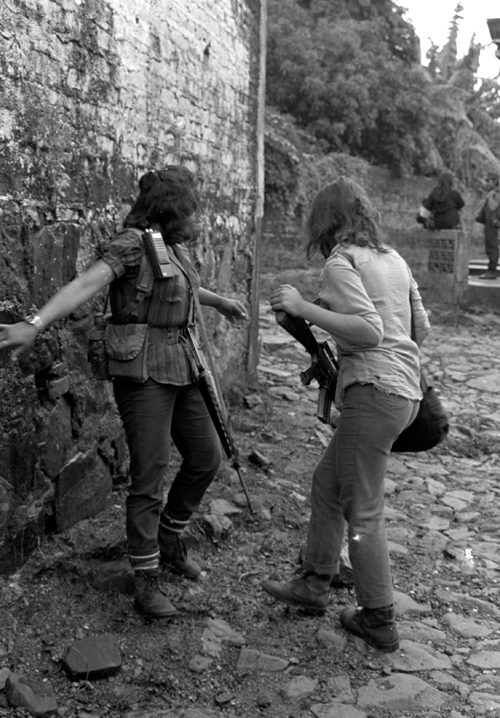
ERP combatants Perquín 1990

Since 1973, Clelia incorporated many workers of the factory "Cinturón Obrero" of San Salvador, in the secret worker unit of the ERP. She joined the urban guerrilla and took part in armed actions and revolutionary propaganda. In January 1974, aged 19, she went underground to avoid persecutions and joined the armed struggle, where she partecipe to the construction of the Partido de la Revolución Salvadoreña (PRS-ERP - Salvadoran Revolution Party, one of the founding subjects of the FMLN) becoming a member of its central committee in 1977. As member of it, she was responsible for the party and participated in the preparation of the general offensive of 1981 around the city of San Salvador, when she was captured of February 11.

For 22 days Clelia stayed on condition of desaparecida in a clandestine prison of the Policía Nacional (National Police), wheres she was found by the International Red Cross and transferred to the women's prison of Ilopango. She was released in June 1983 by an amnesty decreed by the government of Álvaro Magaña. After it, she joined the north-eastern military front Francisco Sánchez of the FMLN. Two months later she died in battle.

== Media ==
- A 1985 song of the Salvadoran singer Eduardo Cutumay Camones was named Comandante Clelia. The song is part of the album Por Eso Luchamos
- The 1984 documentary film Commander Clelia: Political Prisoner is based on the interviews of 5 women, included Lilian Letona, imprisoned in the Salvadoran women's prison of Ilopango
- In a 1992 song of the Italian group Banda Bassotti, named Figli della stessa rabbia, the Commander Clelia was cited with other revolutionary marxists. The song is part of the homonym album

== See also ==
- Mélida Anaya Montes ("Ana María")
- Salvadoran Civil War
- Frente Farabundo Martí para la Liberación Nacional
