= Chocón Machacas River =

Location
- Country: Guatemala
- Departments: Alta Verapaz and Izabal

Physical characteristics
- Source
  - location: Sierra de Santa Cruz
  - elevation: 100 m (330 ft)
- Mouth
  - location: Golfete Dulce
  - coordinates: 15°45′30″N 88°52′31″W
- Length: 53 km (33 mi)
- Basin size: Gulf of Honduras

The Chocón Machacas River is a river in eastern Guatemala. The sources of the 53-kilometre-long (33 mi) river are on the eastern slopes of the Sierra de Santa Cruz at 15.793835°N 89.133890°W. From there it flows in a generally west-south-west direction into the Golfete Dulce. The Chocón Machacas and Golfete Dulce complex forms one of Guatemala's few remaining habitats for the endangered Caribbean manatee (Trichechus manatus).
