= History of rail transport in El Salvador =

This article is part of the history of rail transport by country series

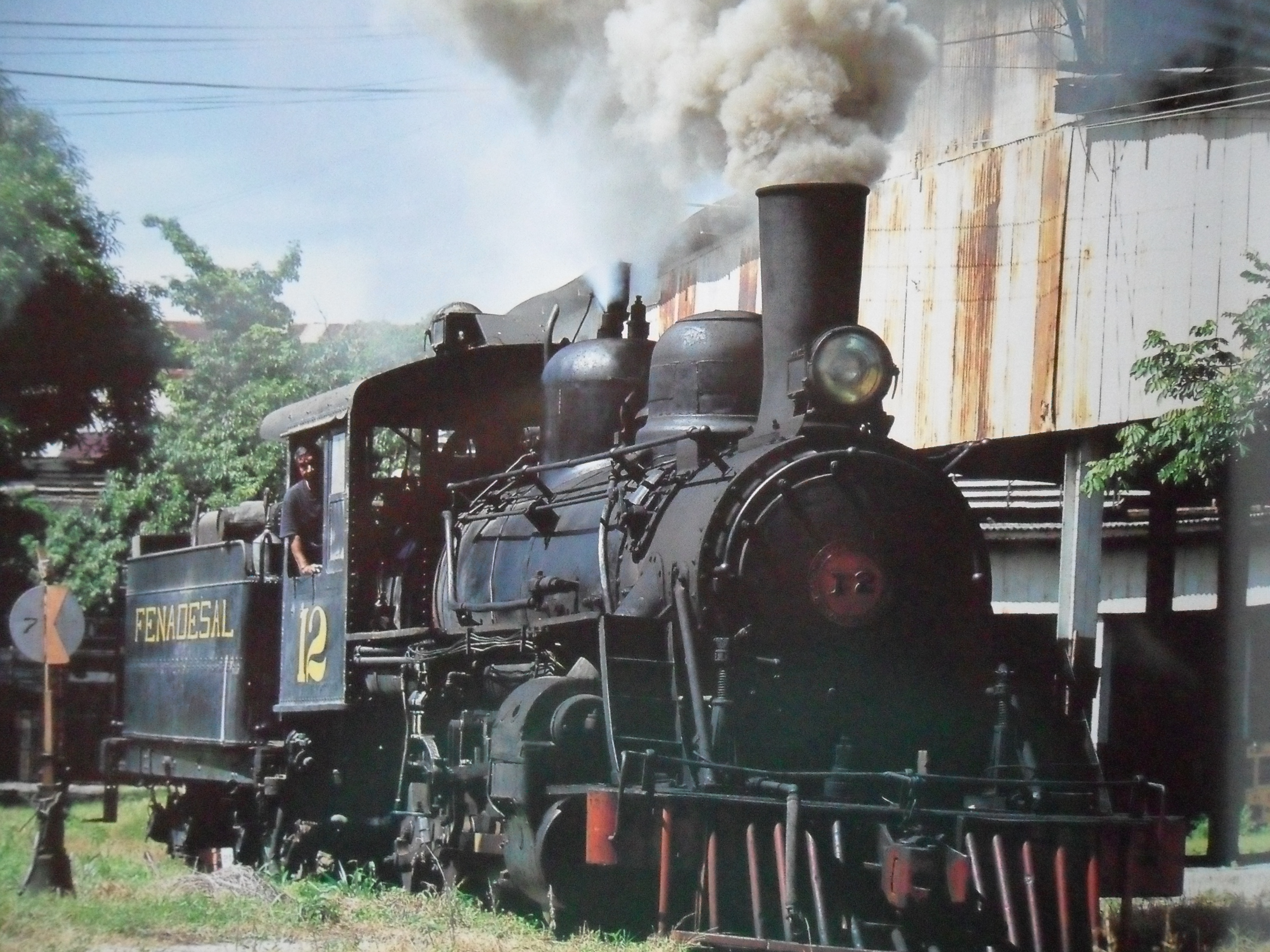
A steam locomotive at Apopa

The history of rail transport in El Salvador began in 1882, with the opening of El Salvador's first line. All rail transport was suspended in 2002. However, limited services were resumed in 2007, between San Salvador, Ciudad Delgado and Apopa.

== See also ==
- History of El Salvador
- Rail transport in El Salvador
