= Valdagno =

- Comune
- Comune di Valdagno
- Coat of arms

- Location within Italy Location within Veneto
- Coordinates: 45°39′N 11°18′E
- Country: Italy
- Region: Veneto
- Province: Vicenza (VI)
- Frazioni: Campotamaso, Castelvecchio, Cerealto, Maglio, Massignani, Novale, Piana, San Quirico

Government
  - Mayor: Giancarlo Acerbi

Area
  - Total: 50.22 km^{2} (19.39 sq mi)

Population (1 January 2021)
  - Total: 25,706
  - Density: 511.9/km^{2} (1,326/sq mi)
- Demonym: Valdagnesi
- Time zone: UTC+1 (CET)
  - Summer (DST): UTC+2 (CEST)
- Postal code: 36078, 36070, 36074
- Dialing code: 0445
- ISTAT code: 024111
- Patron saint: St. Clement
- Saint day: November 23
- Website: Official website

Valdagno is a town and comune in the province of Vicenza, north-eastern Italy. The town was the birthplace of the textile manufacturing company Marzotto, and home to the Italian hotel chain "Jolly Hotels".

== Etymology ==
The word "Valdagno" is the union of the sentence "valle dell'Agno", meaning "valley of the Agno". According to historian Giovanni Mantese, the name originated from the Latin Vallis Alnei, meaning "valley of ontano".

== Geography ==
The town extends along the river Agno, from which Valdagno takes its name, and the homonymous valley surrounded by hills; the Piccole Dolomiti and the Alti Lessini. The presence of the river Agno influenced both the town origins and its development; in particular, it provided water to the population, increasing industrial activities especially in the textile area. The valley has a west–east orientation, allowing wind currents from the Adriatic Sea to cause climate consequences.

The municipal area is split by the SP. 246 road, which provides links to the north with Recoaro Terme and to the south with Cornedo Vicentino. The historical town centre is seen as a reference point by the entirety of the community.

== History ==
The town has been known to exist from the year 861. It is first mentioned in an 1184 document when it was a fief given by the Vicenza bishop to the Trissino family.

Two castles were erected on two opposite hills, one being named the Valdagno castle and the other the Panisacco Castle. However the Vicenza comune started very soon to contend it to the Trissino family, who in turn joined forces with Scaligers to defend it.

In 1291, in the course of the war with Verona, the Republic of Venice occupied Valdagno and kept it until 1340. In 1377 it was pillaged by Bernabò Visconti and in 1404 it went back to the Venetians. From 1434 to 1439 it was occupied by the Visconti family and then re-annexed to Venice by Gian Giorgio Trissino.

Between 1510 and 1514 it suffered repeated destruction by the armies of Maximilian I, during the War of the League of Cambrai. Starting from 1797, with the fall of the Republic of Venice, Valdagno fell under French and Austrian rule. It was annexed to the newly created Kingdom of Italy in 1866.

Valdagno is the birthplace of Gaetano Marzotto, a pioneer of the textile industry and founder of the Marzotto, which allowed Valdagno to become an industrial centre.

== Places of interest ==
=== The historical centre ===
The majority of the town layout is from the 18th century, in particular from the period of the Republic of Venice.

The 16th century ex-convent Santa Maria delle Grazie is reached by entering Valdagno from Regina Margerita street and heading towards the historic centre. A short walk from the ex convent is Villa Valle, where the once called Orsini-Marzotto, now Centro Culturale Comunale "Gaetano Marzotto", is in charge of curating a municipal modern art gallery and public library. Because of its cultural and artistic value, Villa Valle is considered the most important villa of Valdagno. The honour hall is a wide area uniting different areas of the villa, according to classical Venetian architecture; its height is equivalent of that of two floors, and is lit by twelve openings in the ceiling. The hall is enriched by four doors with triangular pediments, where two images are sculpted representing the seasons and the four vital elements: earth, fire, water and air. On the two shortest sides of the hall, two wooden galleries can be seen connecting the two wings in the first floor of the villa. Other places of interest in the vicinity of Villa Valle are:

- Villa Gajanigo Barbieri, a neoclassical façade villa only visible through a fence. It was designed in the late 18th century by architect Carlo Barrera.
- Villa Zanuso, now Villa Fontanari, built in the second half of the 19th century.

=== Duomo ===
The Duomo of St. Clemente (18th century) is located on the right bank of the river Agno. On the furthest back wall of the sacristy is positioned the big Ancona of Saint Clemente, a stone polyptych carrying the date "1445". The Duomo also holds nine valuable Veronese ringing style bells in C3.

== Sport ==
The town has a football team, F.C. Valdagno and is home to the rink hockey team Isello Hockey Valdagno.

== Gallery ==
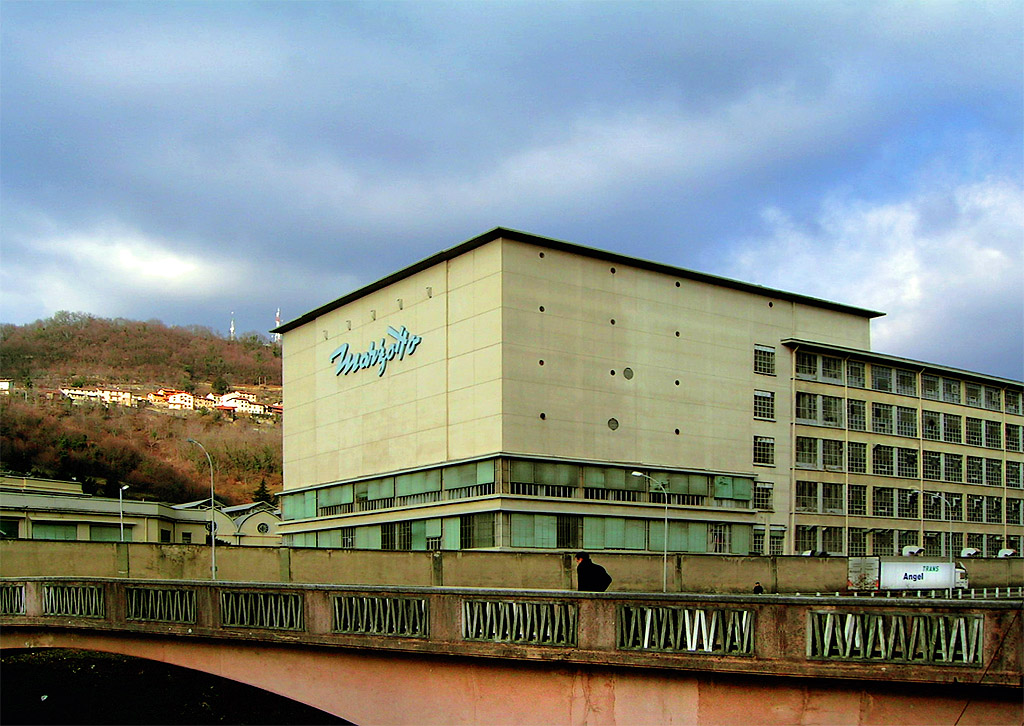
Marzotto headquarters

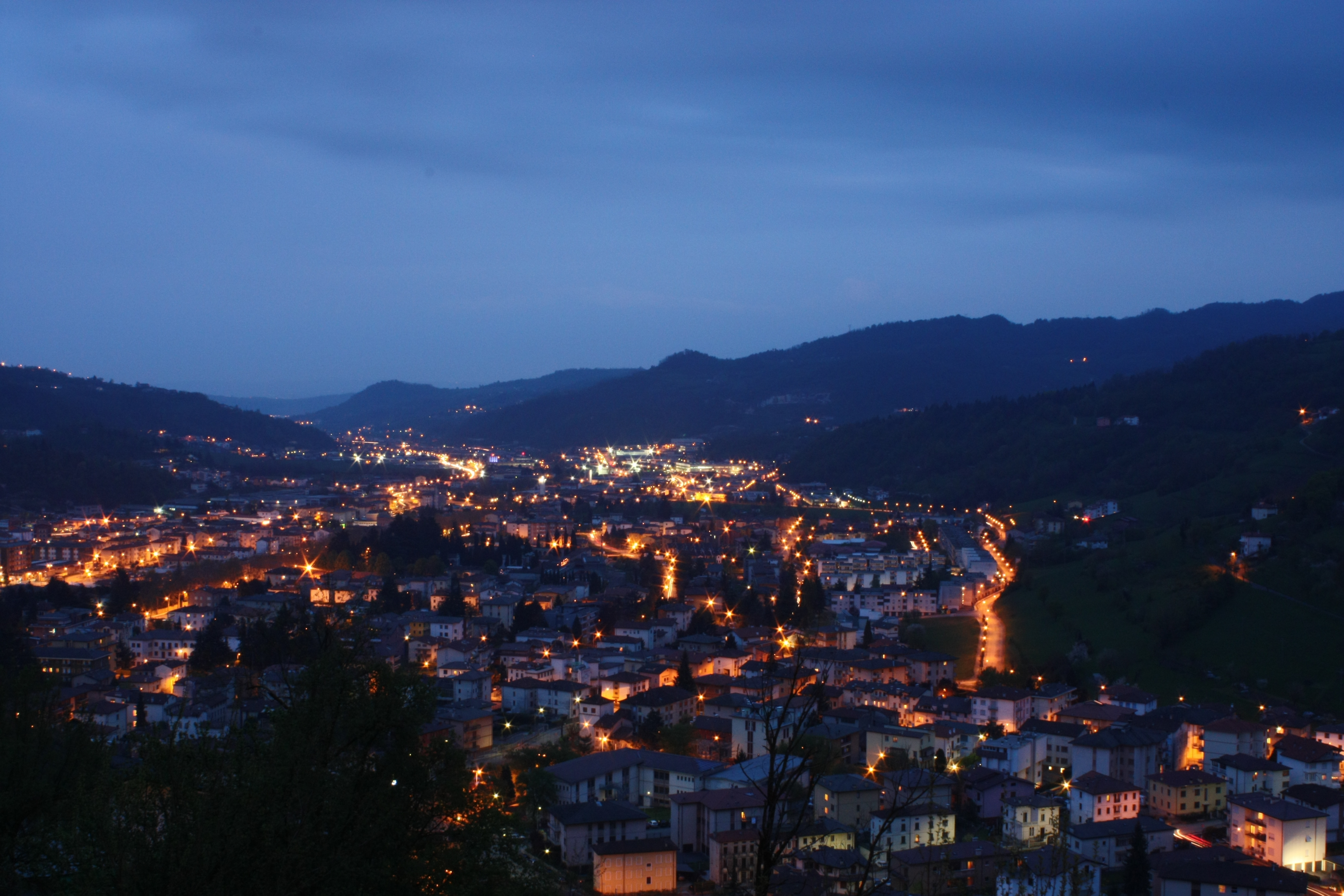
Valdagno by night

== Twin towns ==
- Prien am Chiemsee, Germany, since 1987
