= Centro de Estudios Conservacionistas =

Guatemalan research institute

- Abbreviation: CECON
- Formation: 1981
- Type: Academic
- Purpose: Academic research, Conservation studies
- Headquarters: Guatemala City
- Coordinates: 14.6213°N 90.5075°W
- Region served: Guatemala
- Parent organization: Facultad de Ciencias Químicas y Farmacia, USAC
- Affiliations: CONAP
- Website: www.usac.edu.gt/cecon

The Centro de Estudios Conservacionistas (CECON; Center for Conservation Studies) is a scientific research institute of the San Carlos University of Guatemala (USAC). The center was created in August 1981, and since February 1982 has been administratively attached to USAC's faculty of chemistry and pharmacy.

The "Protected Areas Unit" of CECON manages a number of nature reserves, including:

- Mario Dary Rivera Protected Biotope, better known as "Biotopo del Quetzal", located in Salamá, Baja Verapaz.
- Chocón Machacas Protected Biotope in Livingston, Izabal.
- Cerro Cahuí Protected Biotope
- San Miguel la Palotada (El Zotz) Protected Biotope
- Naachtún-Dos Lagunas Protected Biotope
- El Tigre Protected Biotope in Petén
- Monterrico Multiple use area in Monterrico, Santa Rosa.
