= Cristian Brenna =

Italian rock climber and mountaineer (1970–2025)

Personal information
- Nationality: Italian
- Born: 22 July 1970 Bollate, Italy
- Died: 3 June 2025 (aged 54) Monte Biaena, Italy

Sport
- Country: Italy
- Sport: Competition climbing
Medal record
Men's competition climbing
Representing Italy
IFSC Climbing World Cup
Bronze medal – third place	1996	Lead
Silver medal – second place	1998	Lead
Bronze medal – third place	2000	Lead
IFSC Climbing European Championships
Silver medal – second place	1992 Frankfurt	Lead
Silver medal – second place	1998 Nuremberg	Lead
Silver medal – second place	2000 Munich	Lead

Cristian Brenna (22 July 1970 – 3 June 2025) was an Italian rock climber and mountaineer.

Brenna thrice medaled in both the IFSC Climbing European Championships, winning three silver medals, and the IFSC Climbing World Cup, winning two bronze medals and one silver.

Brenna died from an accidental fall while climbing Monte Biaena on 3 June 2025, at the age of 54.
