= Borders of Guatemala =

The borders of Guatemala are the international borders which it shares with four nations:

- Mexico
- Honduras
- Belize
- El Salvador

Over its history Guatemala has been the subject of a number of territorial disputes with its neighbours, stemming in large part from the absence of any definition of its borders prior to independence. Guatemala is situated in the central area of Central America. In more densely populated regions along the borders there are fences to prevent illegal immigration. Areas close to Guatemalan borders experience high rates of crime. The Central American area, notably the Guatemalan border area, is listed as one of the world's most dangerous places.

== Guatemala-Mexico Border ==
For nearly 60 years following Guatemalan independence the Guatemalan-Mexican border was the subject of a territorial dispute between the two countries. Particularly, Guatemala claimed Chiapas (especially Soconusco within that state). This dispute was settled in 1882 by an agreement between the two countries following negotiations in New York.

In 1958, a brief conflict erupted between the two countries as a result of illegal border crossings. The Guatemala-Mexico border is also an important way-station on the route for migrants fleeing Central America and heading towards the United States.

== Guatemala-Honduras Border ==
The Guatemala-Honduras border was the subject of a territorial dispute from Guatemalan independence. In 1930, an agreement was signed between the two countries in Washington to settle their dispute through arbitration. The dispute was finally settled through a unanimous award in 1933.

== Guatemala-Belize dispute ==
Belize and Guatemala have had a long running border dispute, with Guatemala claiming all of Belize's territory.

== Guatemala-El Salvador border ==
During the civil war in El Salvador, the Guatemalan government was primarily concerned with the risk of conflict and instability spilling over the border between the two countries. This was due to the flight of refugees from the conflict over the border into Guatemala.
