= Turín =

- District
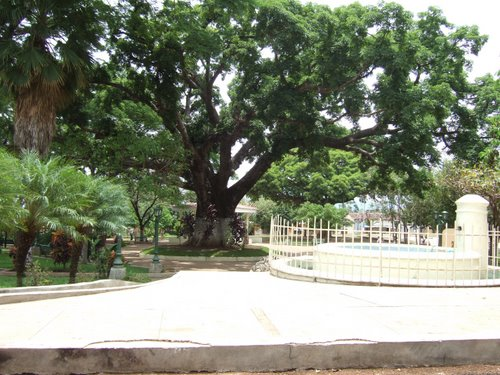
- Turín municipal park

- Location in El Salvador
- Coordinates: 13°58′N 89°49′W
- Country: El Salvador
- Department: Ahuachapán
- Municipality: Ahuachapán Norte
- Elevation: 2,129 ft (649 m)

Population (2024)
  - District: 10,122
  - Rank: 134th in El Salvador
  - Urban: 9,022
  - Rural: 1,100

Turín is a district in the Ahuachapán Department of El Salvador.

== Geography ==
The town is located 4 km west of Atiquizaya, 10 km east of Ahuachapán, the department capital; and 12 km west of Chalchuapa and the neighboring Maya archeological site of Tazumal. It is crossed by the national highway CA 13 and by the Santa Ana-Ahuachapán railway line.

== Notable people ==
- Lilian Mercedes Letona (Commander Clelia, 1954–1983), guerrilla and revolutionary, member of the FMLN
