= Lake Izabal =

Lake in Guatemala

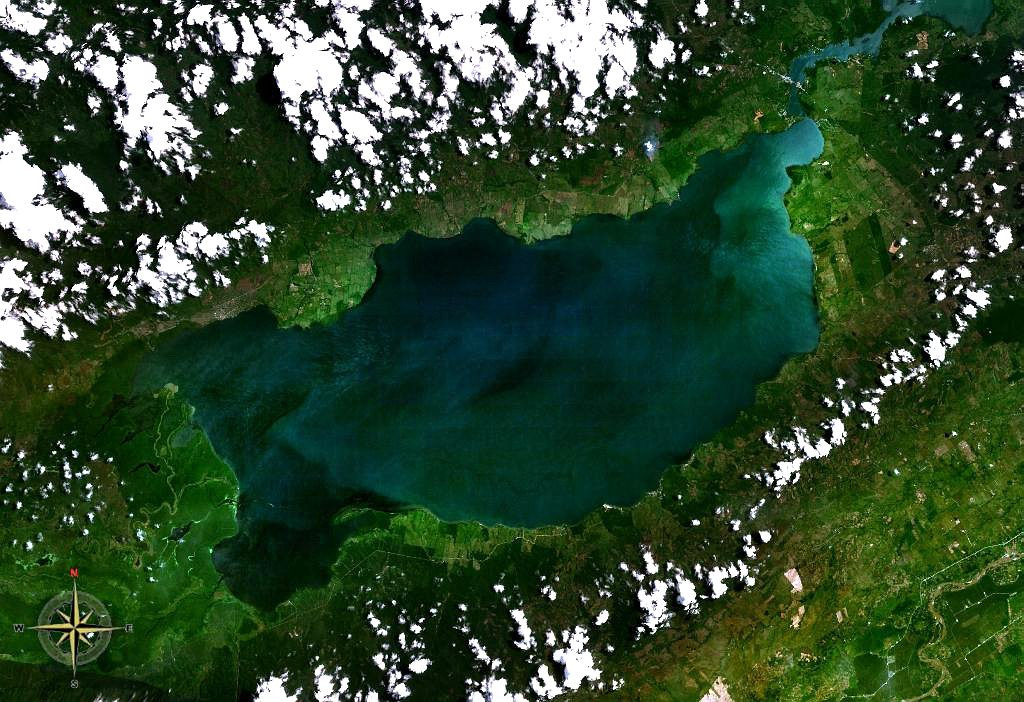
- from space

- Location within Guatemala
- Coordinates: 15.5°N 89.1667°W
- Primary inflows: Polochic River
- Primary outflows: Río Dulce
- Basin countries: Guatemala
- Surface area: 672 km^{2} (259 sq mi)
- Max. depth: 18 m (59 ft)
- Surface elevation: 1 m (3.3 ft)

Lake Izabal (Spanish pronunciation: [isaˈβal]), also known as the Golfo Dulce, is the largest lake in Guatemala with a surface area of 672 km^{2} (166,000 acres; 259 mi^{2}) and a maximum depth of 18 m (59 ft). The Polochic River is the largest river that drains into the lake. The lake, which is only a metre above sea level, drains into the Gulf of Honduras of the Caribbean Sea through the smaller Golfete Dulce, which is at sea level, and the navigable Rio Dulce.

The well-preserved colonial Castillo de San Felipe de Lara guarded this lake against pirate attacks, and there are some ancient sunken ships nearby. It is home to several species, including the manatee, jaguar, spider monkey, blue-eye cichlids, and howler monkey, and is a popular place for birdwatching.

== Culture ==
There are many indigenous communities surrounding the lake, namely the Mayas Q'eqchi'.

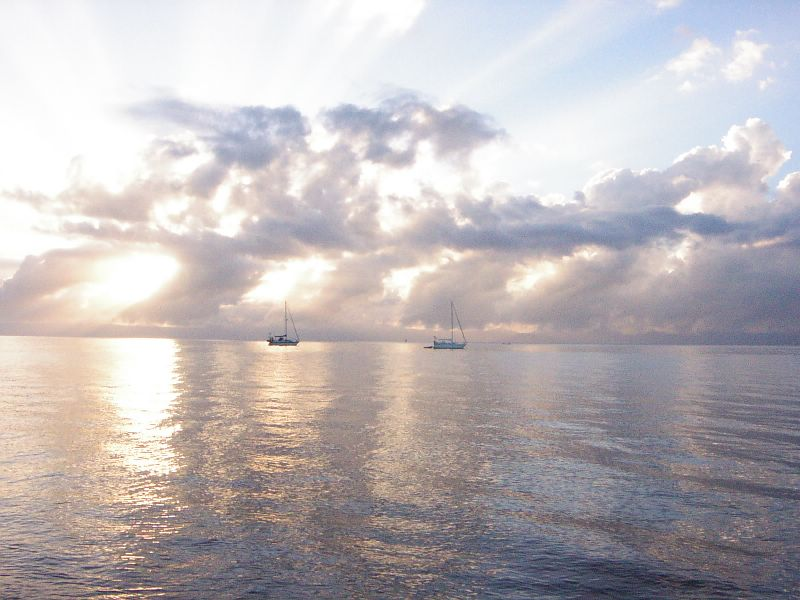
Boats on Lake Izabal

The Castle of San Felipe de Lara, constructed in 1652 in honour of judge Antonio Lara Mangravo, was built to protect the region from pirates.
