= Rail transport in El Salvador =

FENADESAL passenger train in San Salvador Terminal Oriente on January 17, 2005

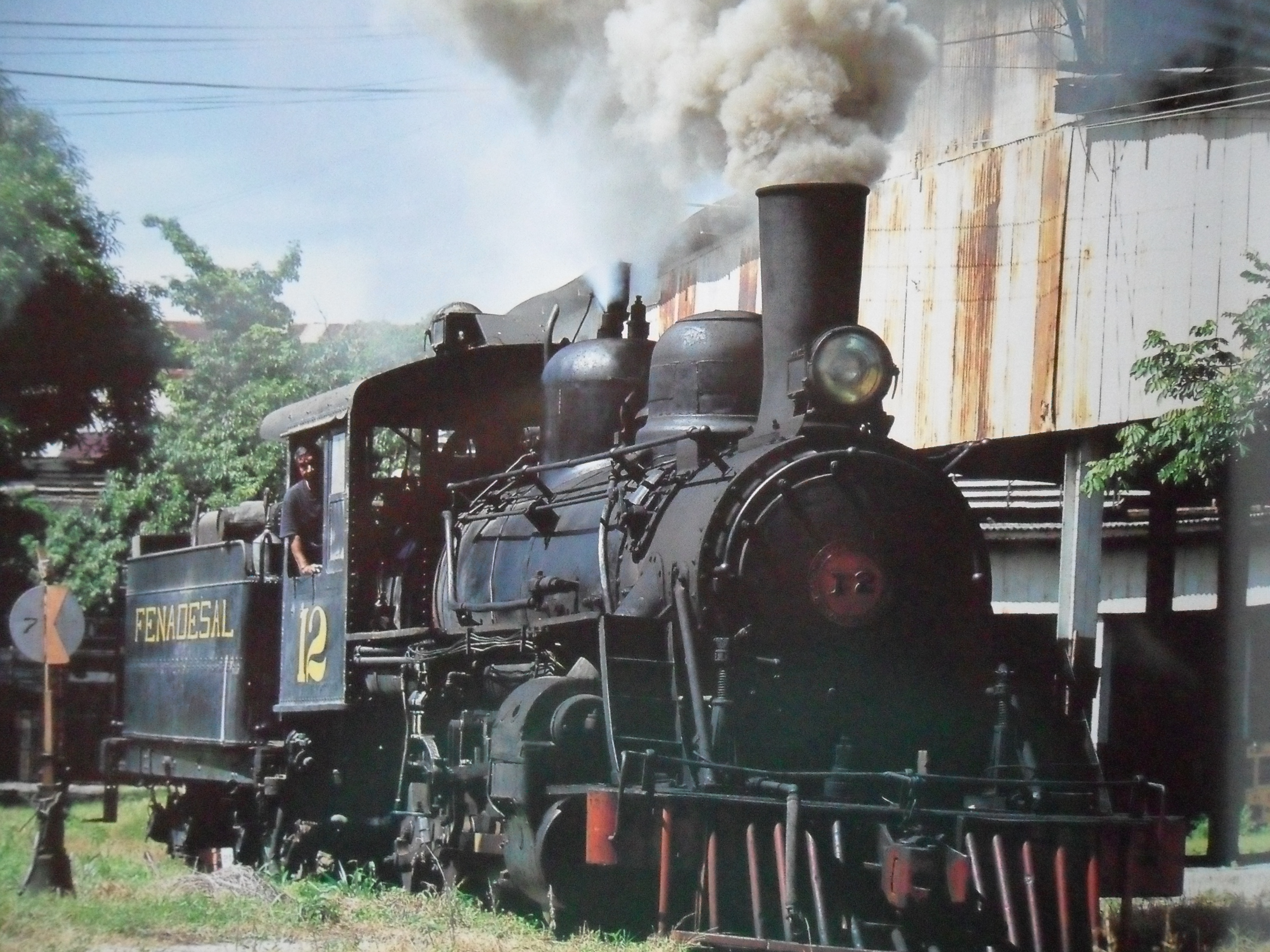
FENADESAL steam engine in Apopa

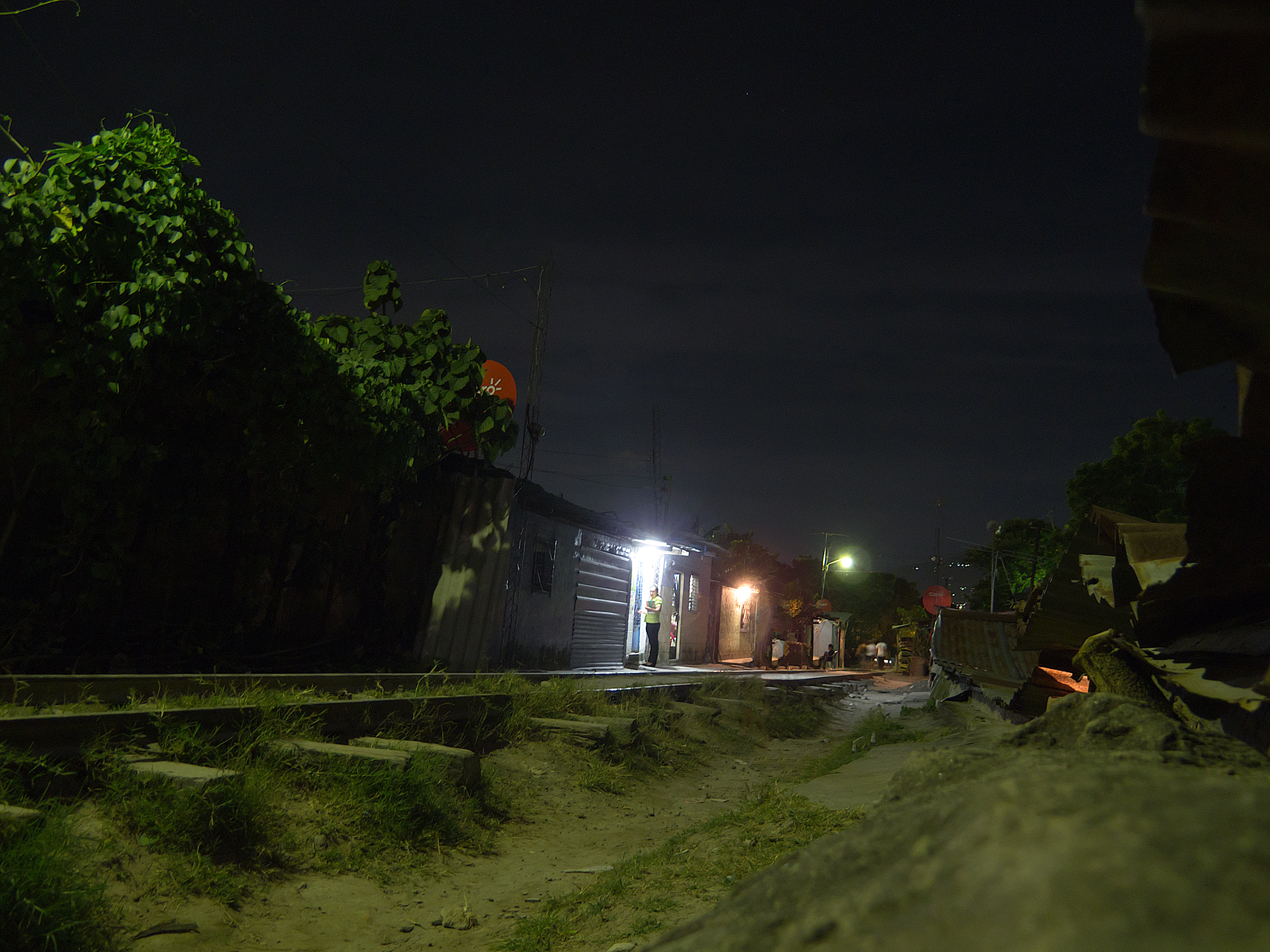
Track in Soyapango in 2011

As of 2022, no trains are operated in El Salvador. The national railroad corporation is FENADESAL (Ferrocarriles Nacionales de El Salvador), a division of the Autonomous Port Executive Commission (CEPA). It oversees 554.8 km of all disused 3 ft (914 mm) narrow gauge lines connecting major cities (San Salvador, Santa Ana, Acajutla, Sonsonate, Soyapango, Zacatecoluca) and formerly linked with Guatemala railroads at Anguiatú.

== History ==
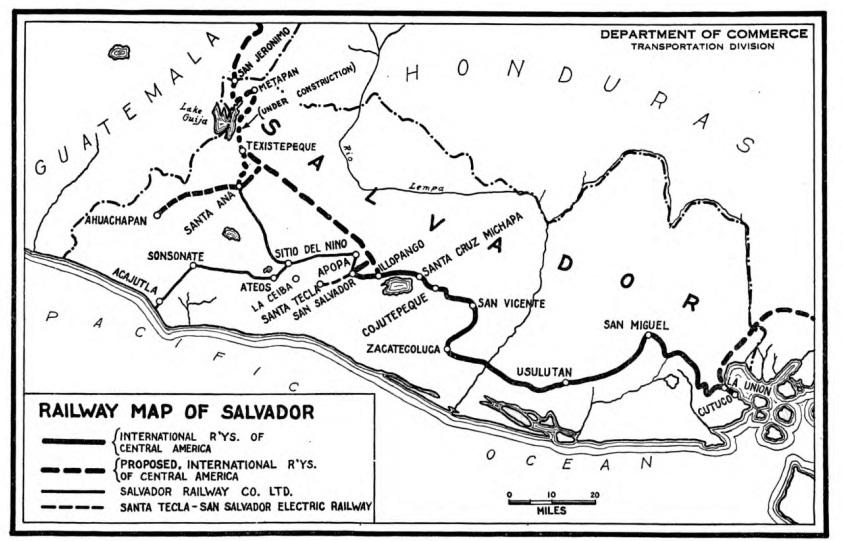
Rail map as of 1925

The first railroad in El Salvador was opened between Sonsonate and the port of Acajutla on June 4, 1882, by the British private company The Salvador Railway Construction Co. The first locomotives were American Tai models, built in England. In the following years, the lines extended to Santa Ana, San Salvador and other places. Parts of network were managed separately by The Salvador Railway Company Limited (later nationalized and renamed FES - Ferrocarril de El Salvador) and IRCA - International Railways of Central America (a United Fruit company, later nationalized and renamed FENASAL - Ferrocarril Nacional de El Salvador). In 1975, based on a governmental decree, the two companies merged into FENADESAL - Ferrocarriles Nacionales de El Salvador, managed and administered by CEPA (port authority) on behalf of the state.

All rail transport was suspended in October 2002. Passenger trains between San Salvador and Soyapango were briefly restored from October 2004 until April 2005 to help alleviate traffic congestion after a collapse of a road bridge which connected these two cities.

In 2006 CEPA presented a pilot scheme for reviving the rail network. Commuter services could be introduced between San Salvador and Apopa, requiring the refurbishment of seven passenger vehicles.

In November 2007 the CEPA plan was put into effect and the service to Apopa was restarted with two return trips each morning and evening aimed at commuter traffic. The fare was 10¢ US for the 12 km trip, and to ensure safety four police officers rode each train (service was suspended from 2013). The plan was to reopen the whole route to the provincial capital of Sonsonate in stages over the next 12 months, with the next stage being Nejapa.

On 26 April 2022, the Legislative Assembly of El Salvador passed a law to begin construction of the Train of the Pacific. The new rail network will be 332 miles (535 kilometers) long.

== See also ==
- El Salvador
- Transport in El Salvador
- Rail transport by country
