= Lake El Golfete =

Lake in Guatemala

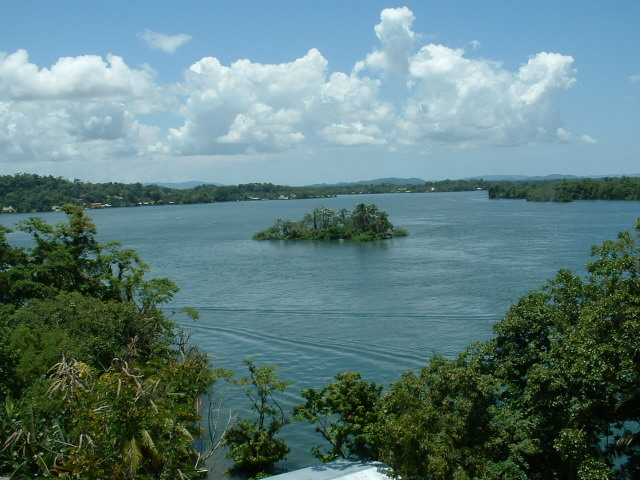
- View of the western side of the Golfete Dulce

- Location within Guatemala
- Coordinates: 15.7281°N 88.8807°W
- Primary inflows: Río Dulce
- Primary outflows: Río Dulce
- Basin countries: Guatemala
- Surface area: 62 km^{2} (24 sq mi)
- Surface elevation: 0 m (0 ft)

Lake El Golfete is a long narrow lake in Guatemala. It lies at sea level and is fed by the Dulce River from Lake Izabal draining to the Amatique Bay in the Caribbean Sea.
