= Dulce River (Guatemala) =

River in Guatemala

Río Dulce
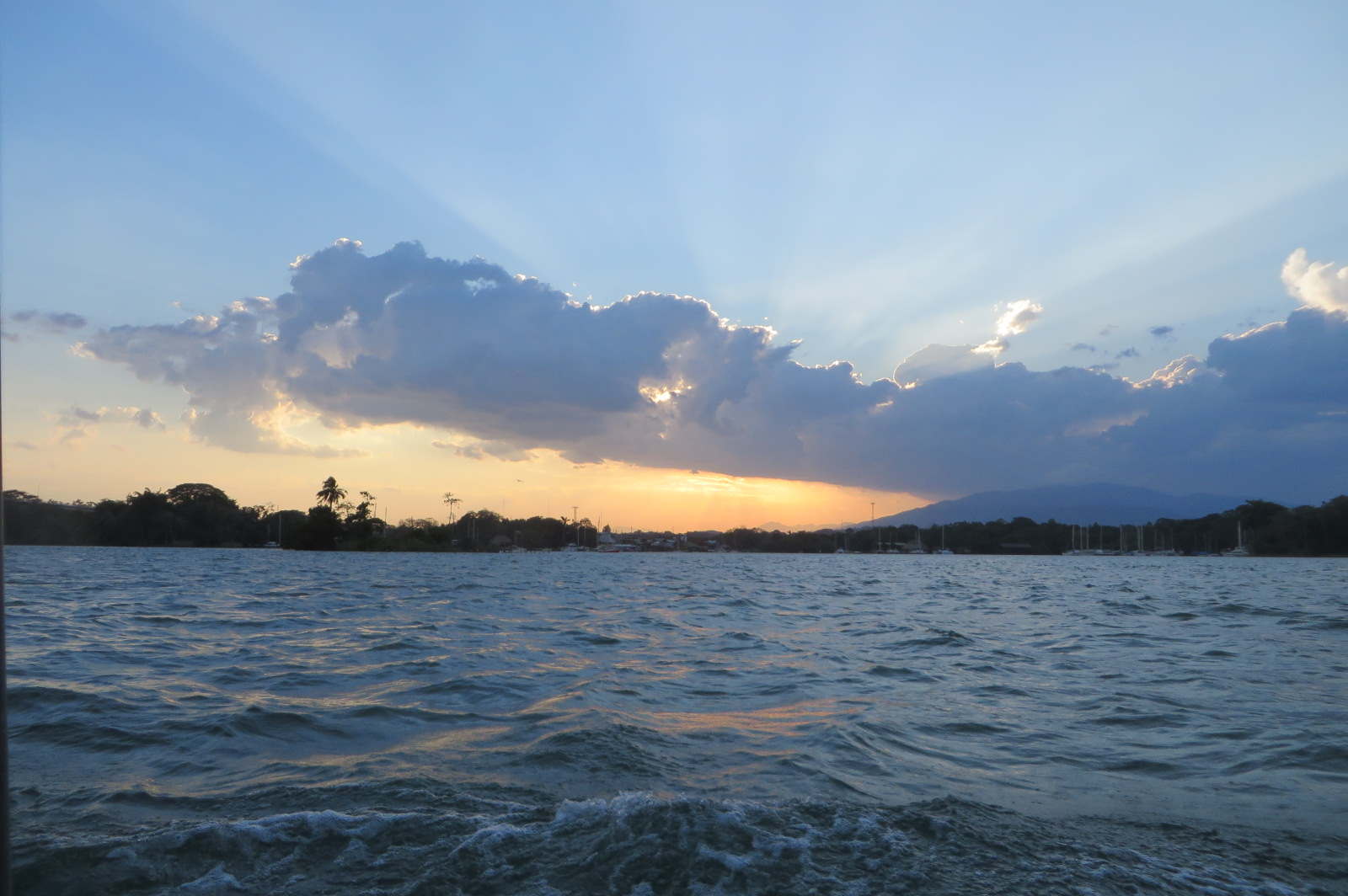

- Location of mouth

Location
- Country: Guatemala
- Department: Izabal

Physical characteristics
- Source
  - location: Lake Izabal
  - elevation: 88 m (289 ft)
- Mouth
  - location: Livingston
  - coordinates: 15°48′52″N 88°45′14″W
  - elevation: 0 m (Caribbean Sea)
- Length: 43 km (27 mi)

Dulce River (Spanish: Río Dulce, or "Sweet River") is a river in Guatemala, completely contained within the department of Izabal. It is part of a lake and river system that has become a popular cruising sailboat destination.

The river begins at the point where it flows out of Lake Izabal. At the entrance to the river there is a small Spanish colonial fort, the Castillo de San Felipe de Lara, built to stop pirates entering the lake from the Caribbean when this part of Central America was an important shipping staging point.

Just after the river flows from Lake Izabal it is spanned by one of the biggest bridges in Central America. On one side of the bridge is the town of Fronteras, commonly referred to by the name Río Dulce, the local center of commerce for the area. Fronteras has a local vegetable market, attracting locals from the countryside who arrive in dugout canoes. Most of these boats are powered with Japanese outboard motors but many come to market day paddling these cayucos by hand. On the other side is the town of El Relleno. Nearby is the children's village of Casa Guatemala, an orphanage that houses roughly 250 children and provides them with education and nourishment.

From Fronteras the river flows east for a few kilometres. Along this stretch, there are several marinas and resorts. The river then flows into a long narrow lake called El Golfete. This lake has an island and a large natural anchorage. A few houses and a couple of small businesses line the shore. El Golfete is about 16 kilometres (10 mi) long and a few kilometres wide.

From El Golfete the river meanders for 10 kilometres (6 mi) in a spectacular gorge. The sides of the gorge rise up to 91 metres (300 ft) on either side and are covered with teak, mahogany and palms. Wild flowers bloom throughout the foliage and howler monkeys and toucans can be seen. Waterfalls flow over the lip of the gorge after rainfall.

Biologically, the river's brackish water system and sheltered submerged aquatic vegetation in El Golfete serve as a vital sanctuary for the West Indian manatee (Trichechus manatus), alongside various endemic freshwater and estuarine fish species.

The river enters the Caribbean Sea near the Garifuna town of Livingston.

== Río Dulce National Park ==
Río Dulce National Park
- Interactive map of Río Dulce National Park
- Location: Izabal, Guatemala
- Coordinates: 15°44′20″N 88°52′20″W
- Area: 130 km^{2} (50 sq mi)
- Elevation: 90 m (300 ft)
- Established: Acuerdo Gubernativo 28-05-55, 23-08-88,182-93
- Operator: CONAP

The Río Dulce National Park is in the department of Izabal in Guatemala. The park covers an area of 130 square kilometres (50 mi^{2}) along the banks of the Dulce river and the El Golfete.

== Historical images ==
=== The New Adventures of Tarzan (1935) ===
The film The New Adventures of Tarzan was filmed entirely on location in Guatemala in 1935. They reached some locations using the railroad service in Guatemala, which was controlled by the American International Railways of Central America (IRCA), owned by the United Fruit Company— and had major stations at Puerto San José, Guatemala City and Puerto Barrios.

The railroad company offered tours to visit the UFCO banana plantations in Izabal and the Maya city of Quiriguá —which at the time was placed within UFCO property— and offered their visitors the option to comfortably sail Río Dulce and Lake Izabal to Livingston in one of their steam boats. Here are a few photographs taken from an excursion made in 1927 by the Guatemalan History and Geography Society:

Izabal excursion in 1927

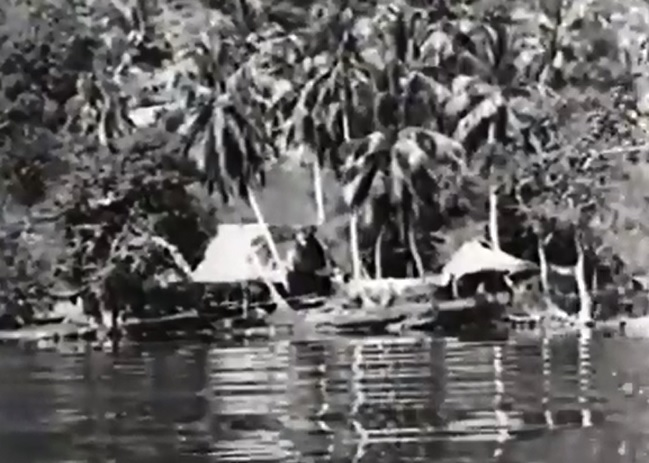
Homes by Río Dulce, filmed from one of the IRCA steamboats. The Tarzan movie shows almost identical shots.

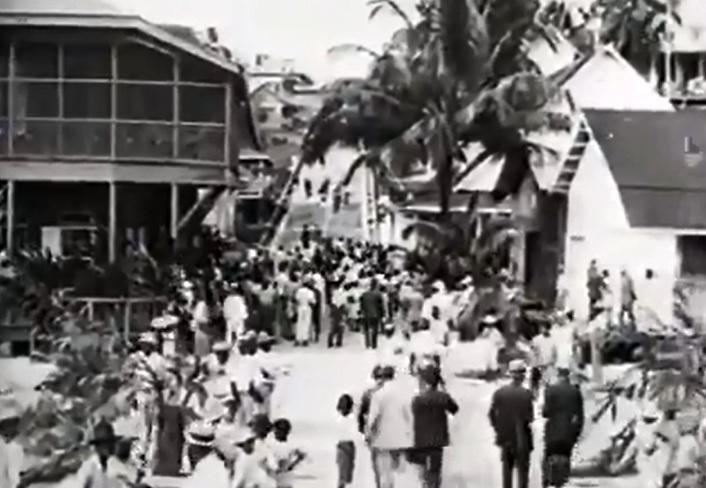
Tourist in Livingston, Izabal, after sailing Río Dulce

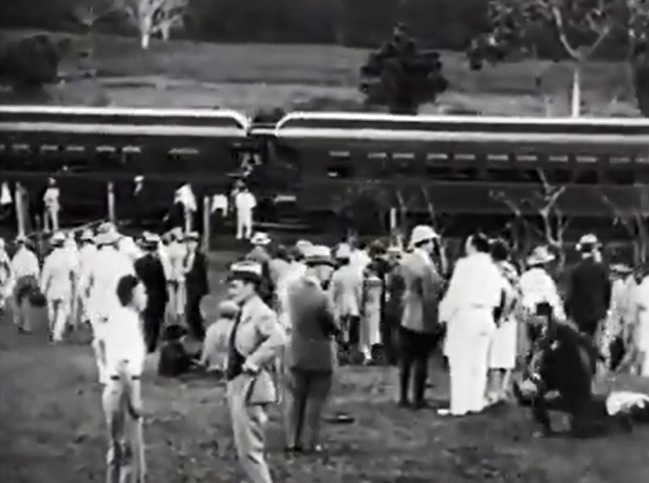
At the train station in Izbal

== See also ==
- El Estor
- List of places in Guatemala

== Notes and references ==
=== Bibliography ===
- Perez, Arlenie; Chuang Chin-Ta; Farok Afero (2009). "Belize-Guatemala territorial dispute and its implications for conservation" (PDF). Tropical Conservation Science. 2 (1): 11–24. doi:10.1177/194008290900200104. S2CID 55033773.
- Perlack, Robert D.; J. Timothy Ensminger; Romeo Martinez (2001). "Guatemala strives for environmental and economic sustainability in the Rio Dulce region". Natural Resources Forum. 25 (3): 235–244. doi:10.1111/j.1477-8947.2001.tb00765.x.
