= List of places in Guatemala =

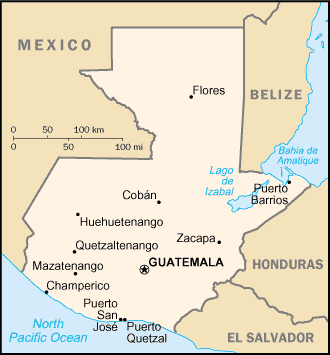
A map of Guatemala.

This is a list of places in Guatemala.

== List of most populous cities in Guatemala ==
Population data up to the 2018 census.

Departmental Capital
National Capital and Departmental Capital

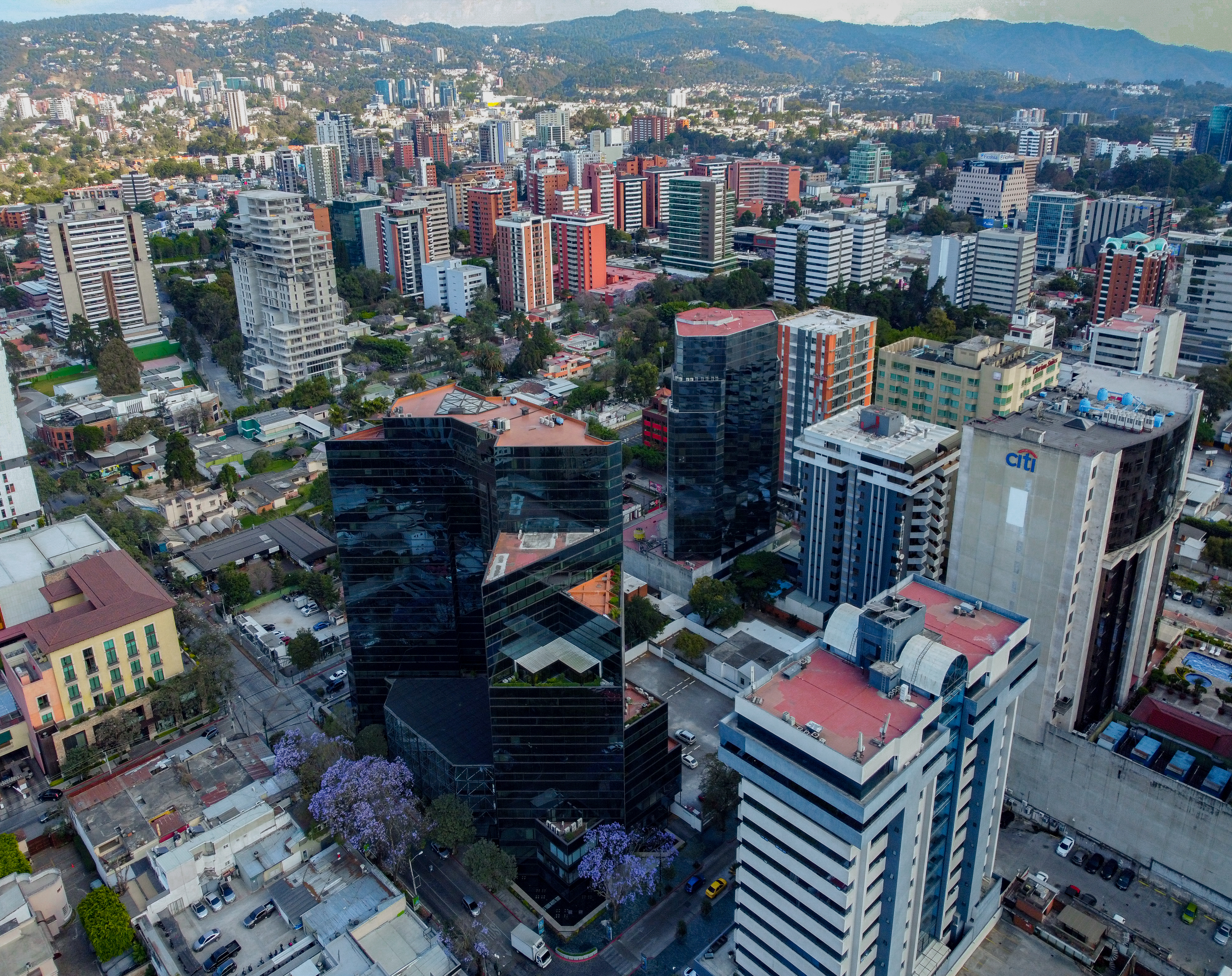
Guatemala City.

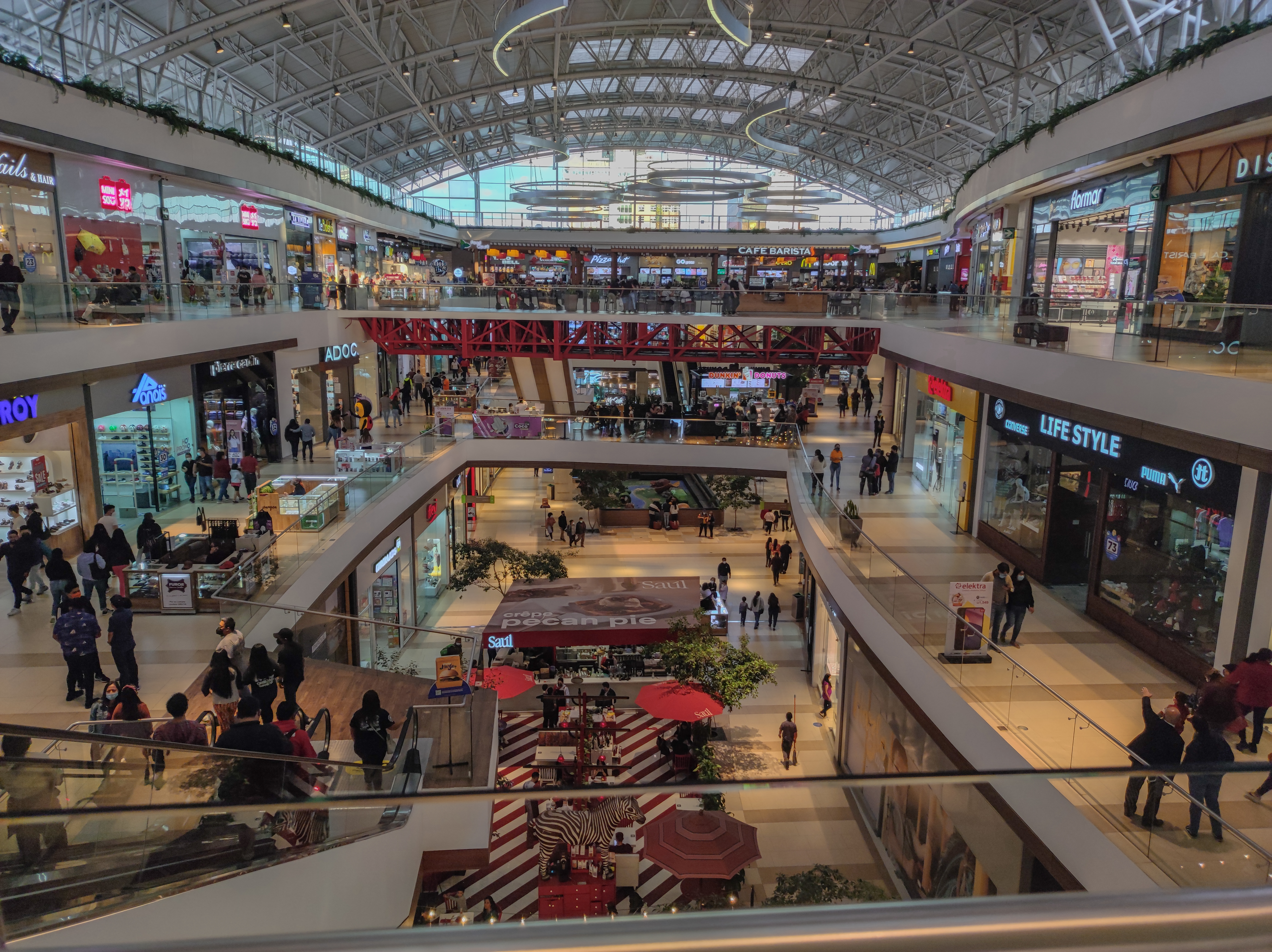
Mixco.

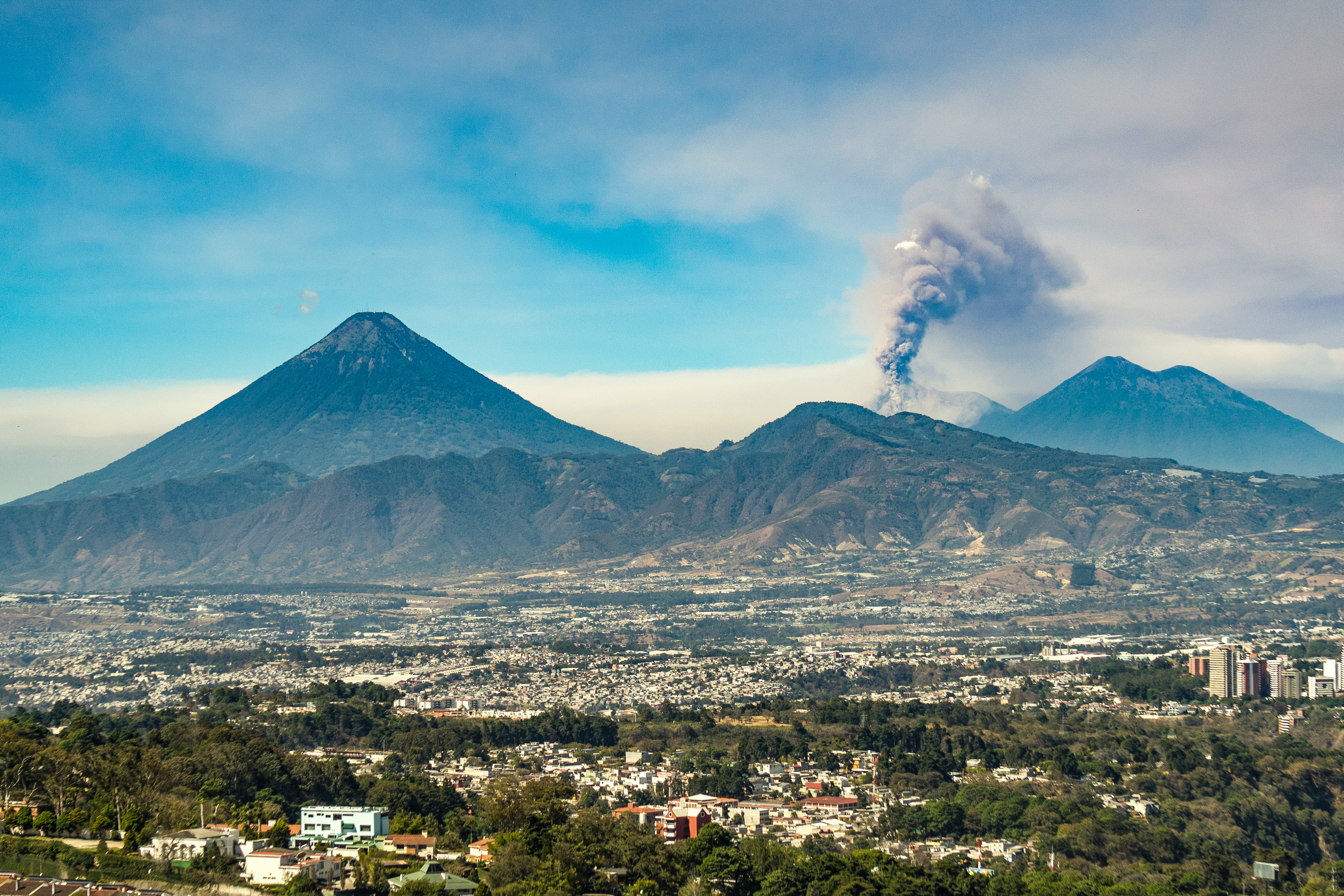
Villa Nueva.

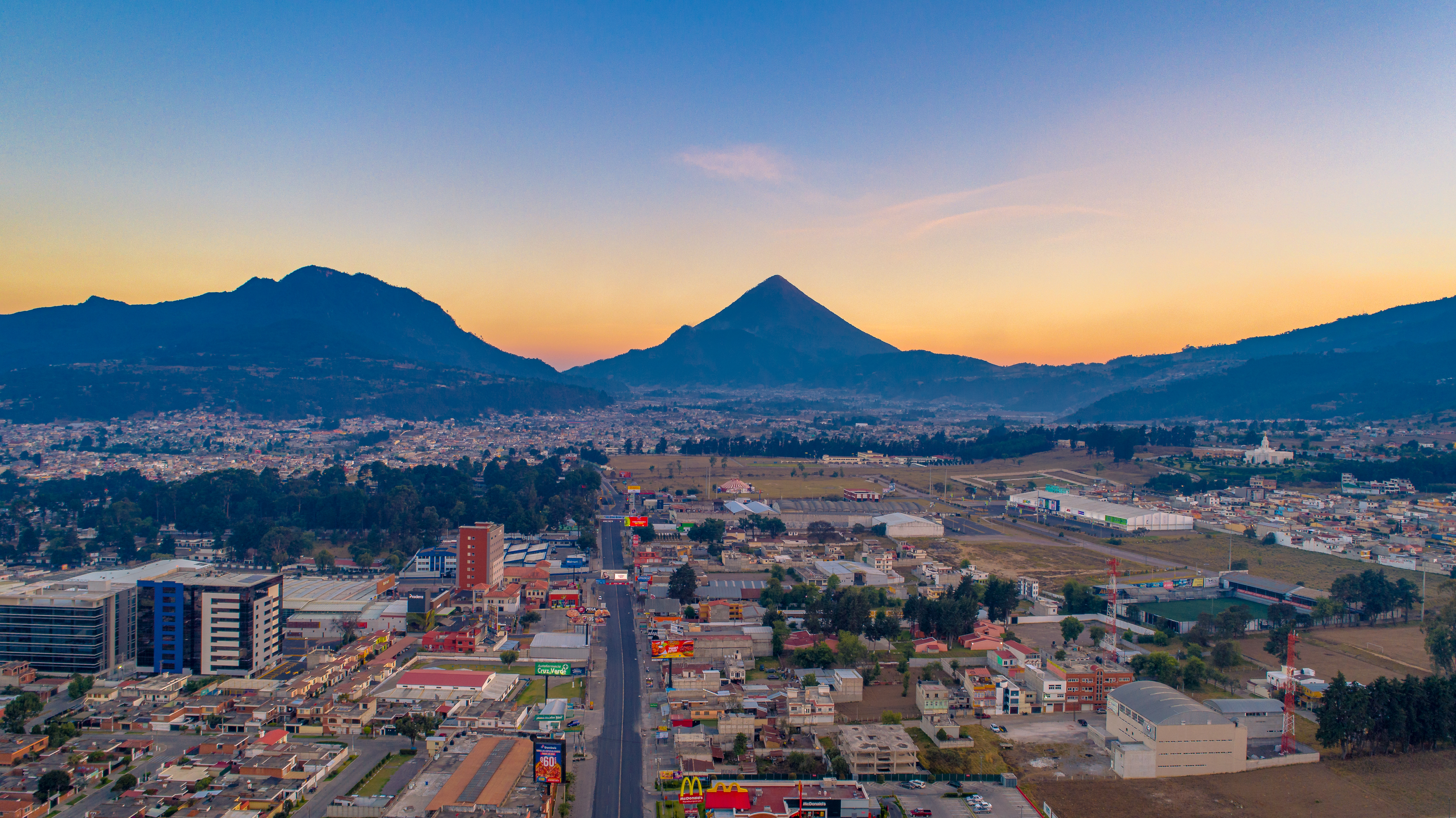
Quetzaltenango.

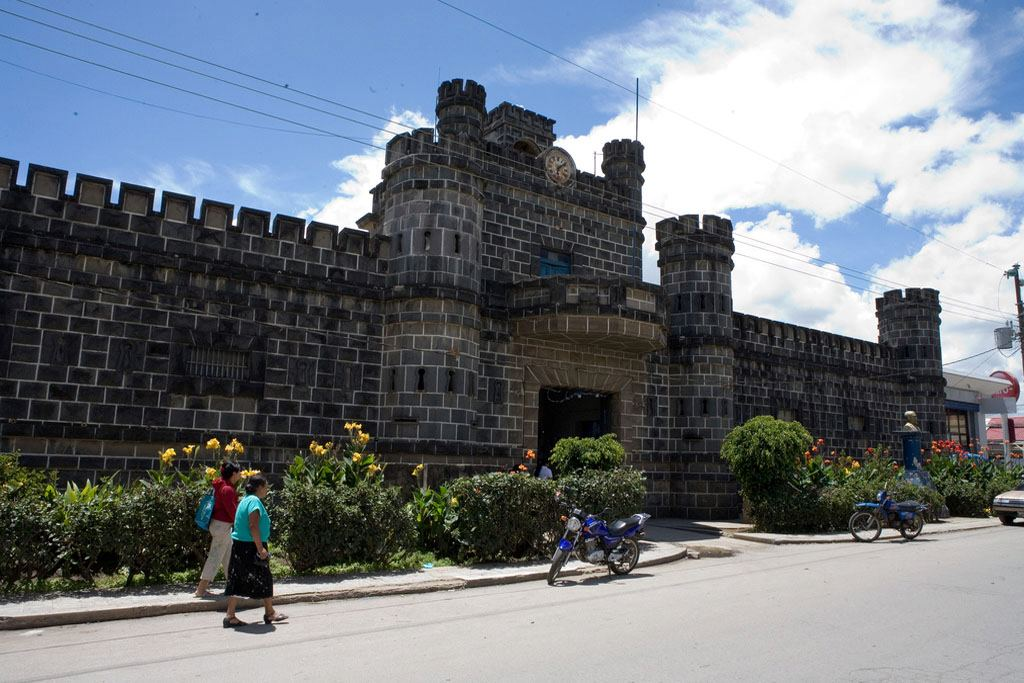
Chimaltenango.

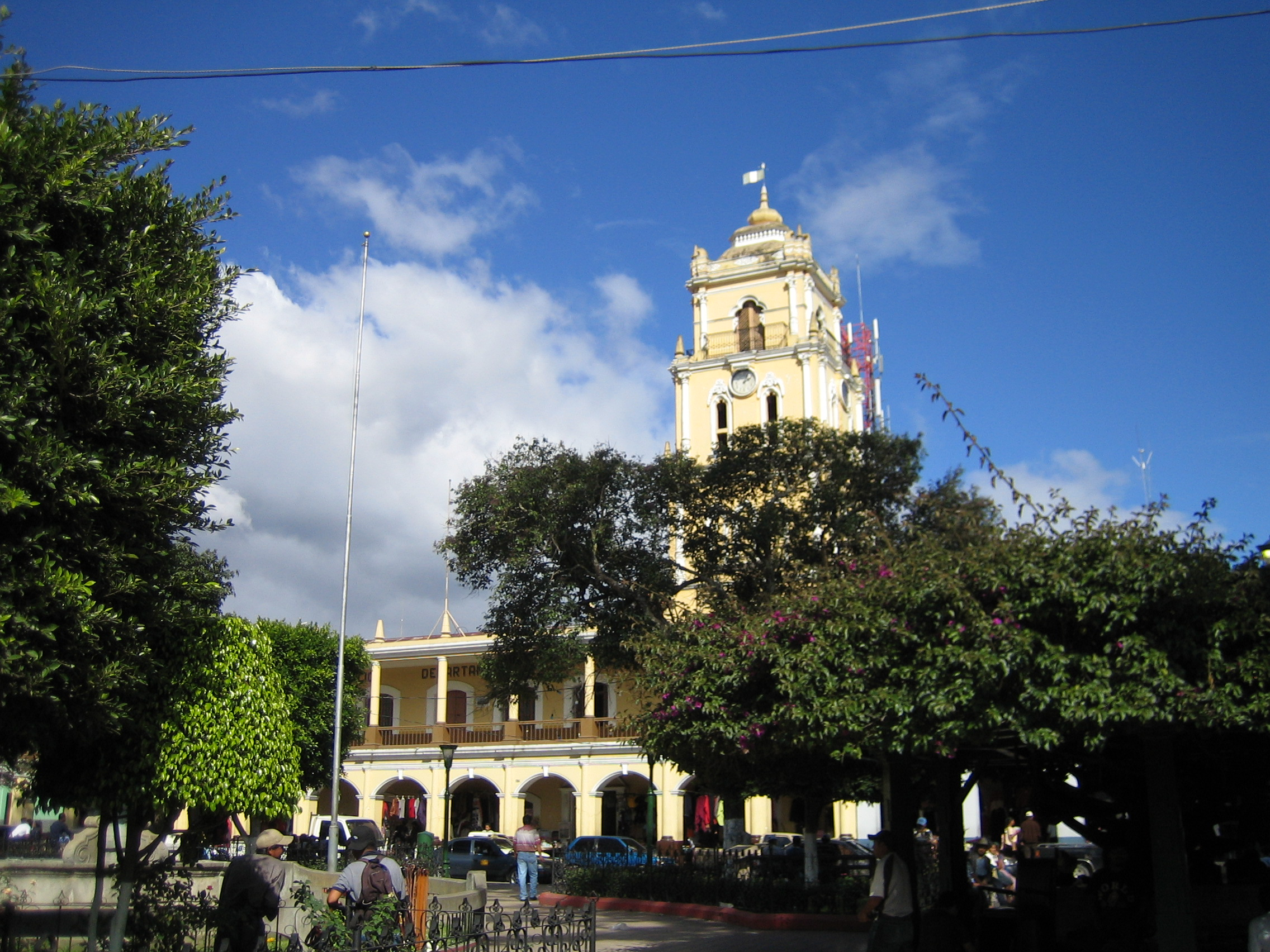
Huehuetenango.

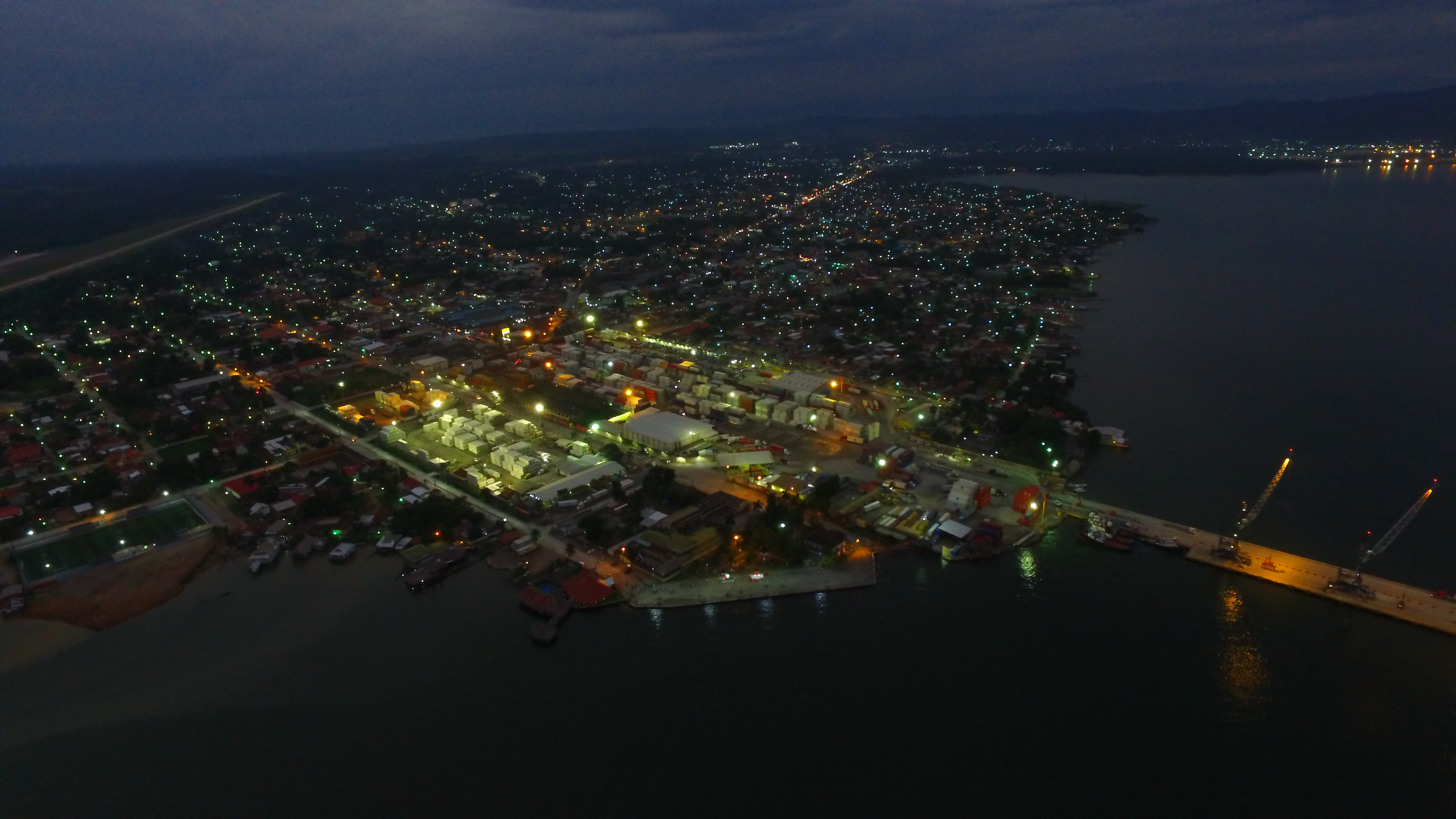
Puerto Barrios.

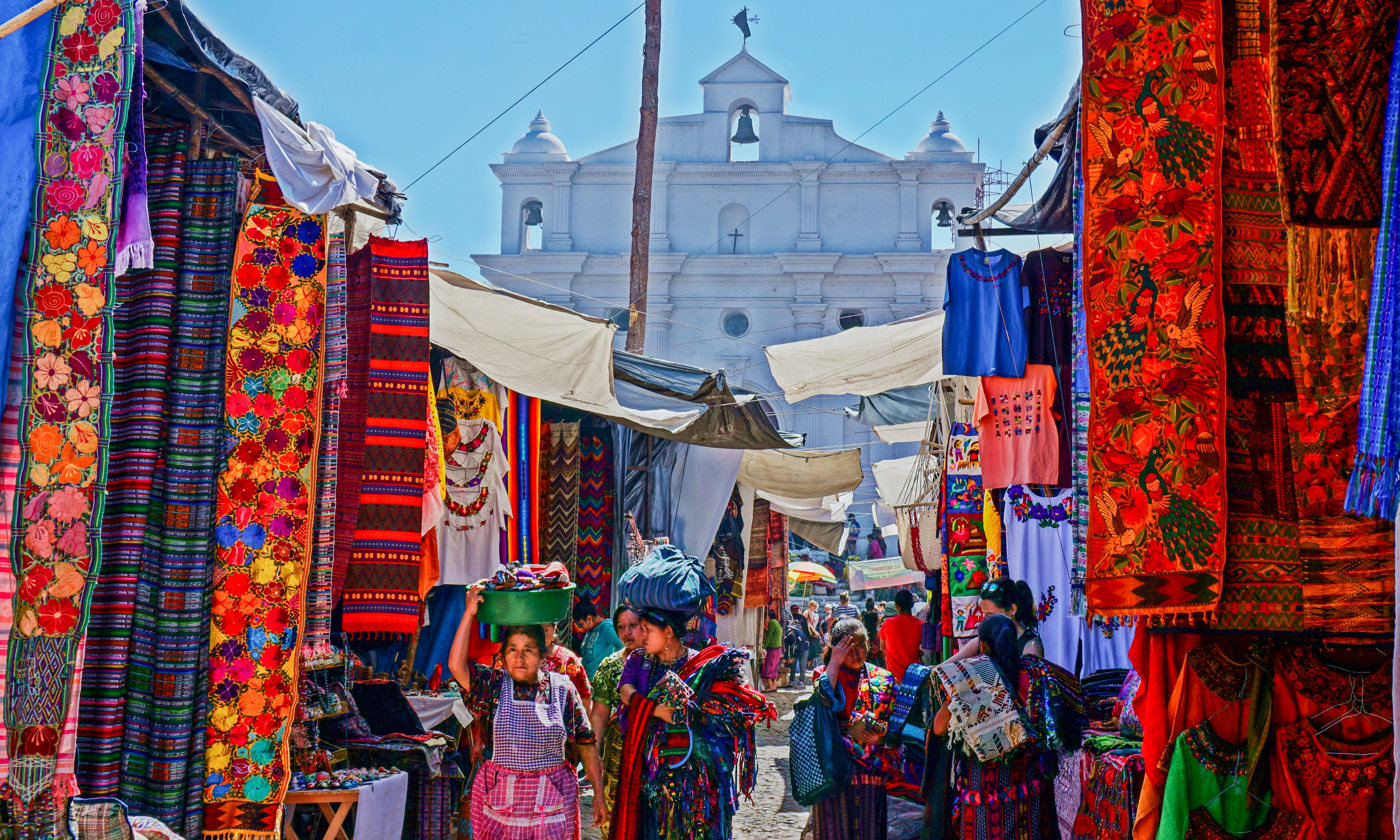
Chichicastenango.

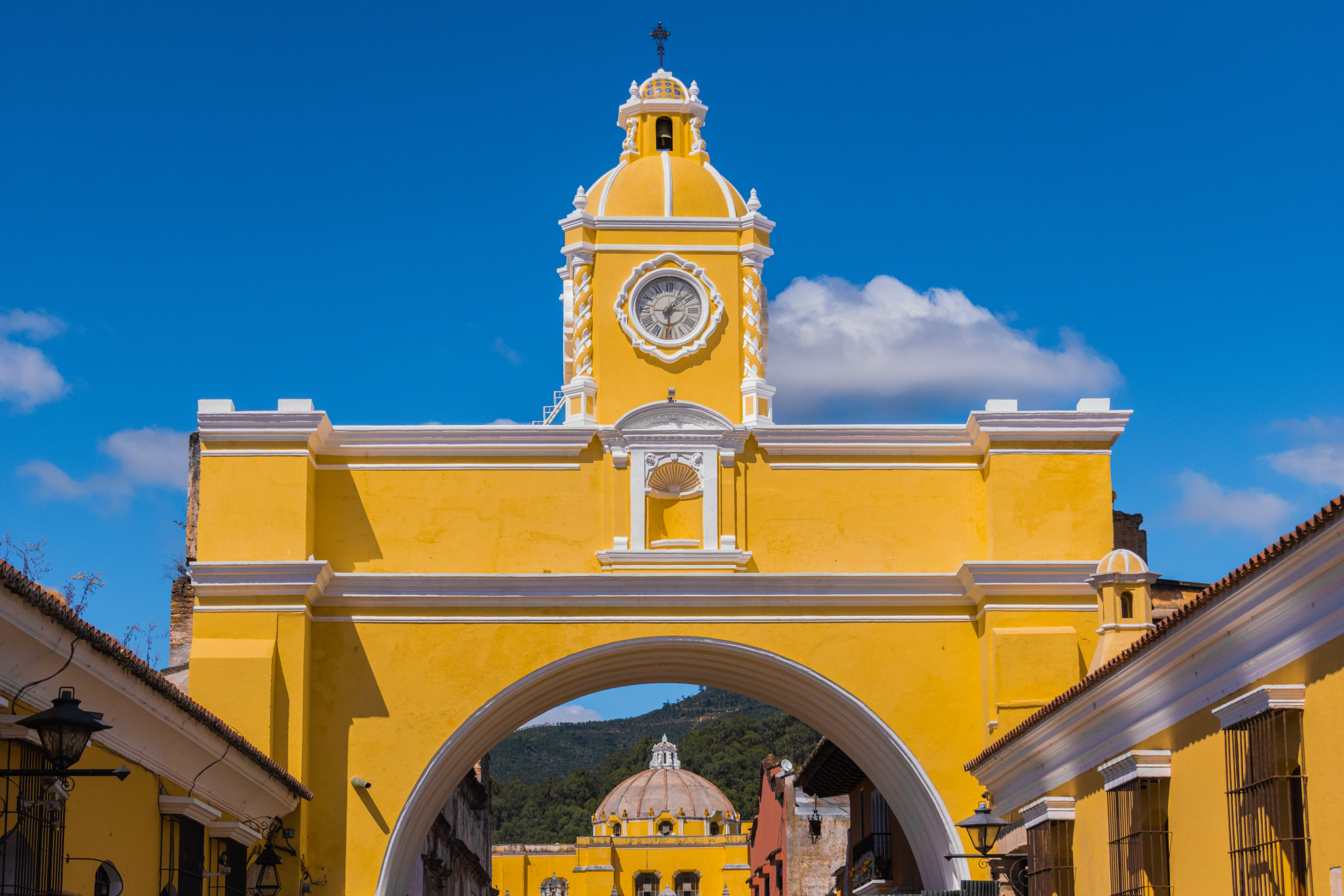
Antigua Guatemala.

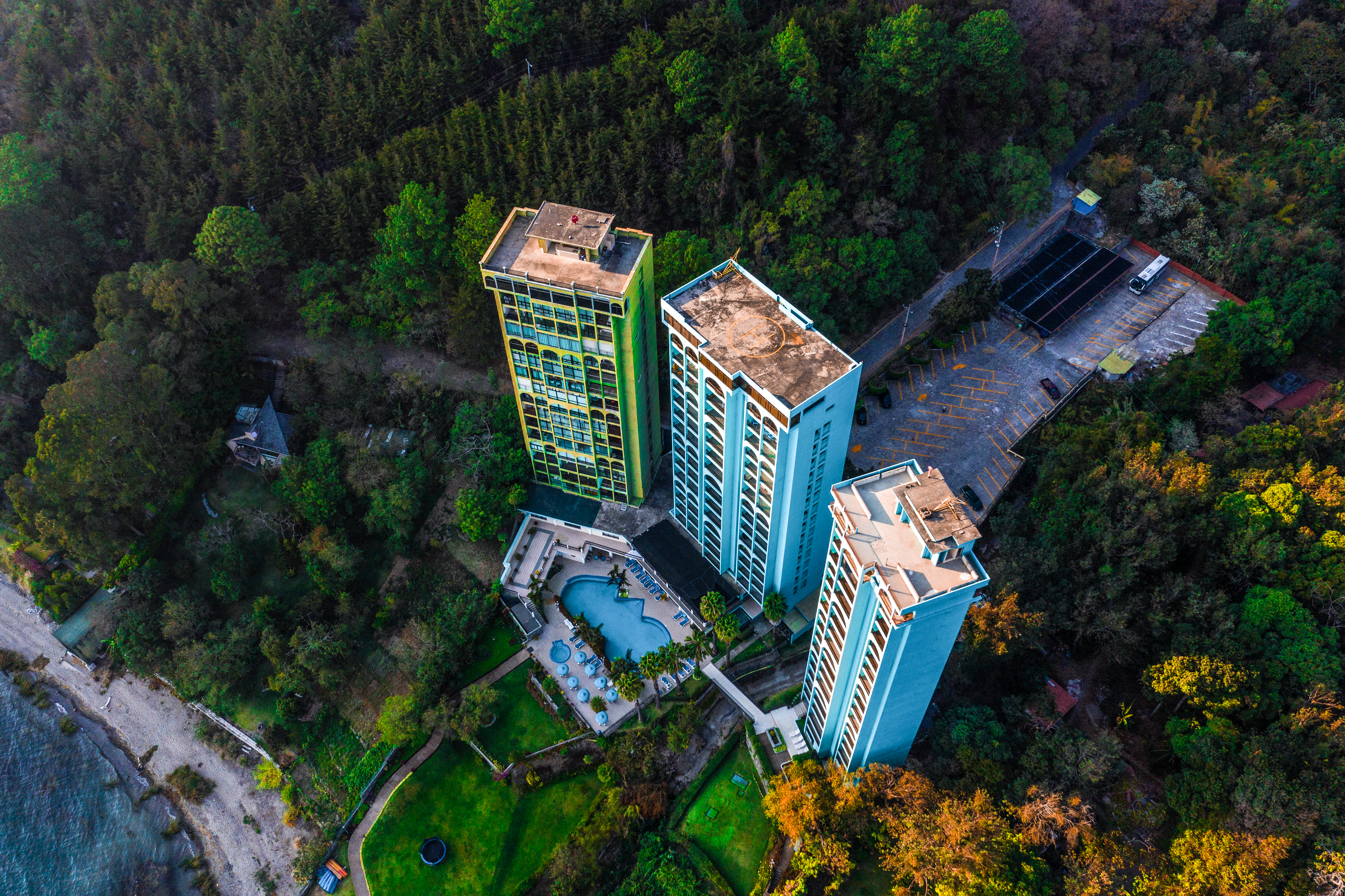
Sololá.

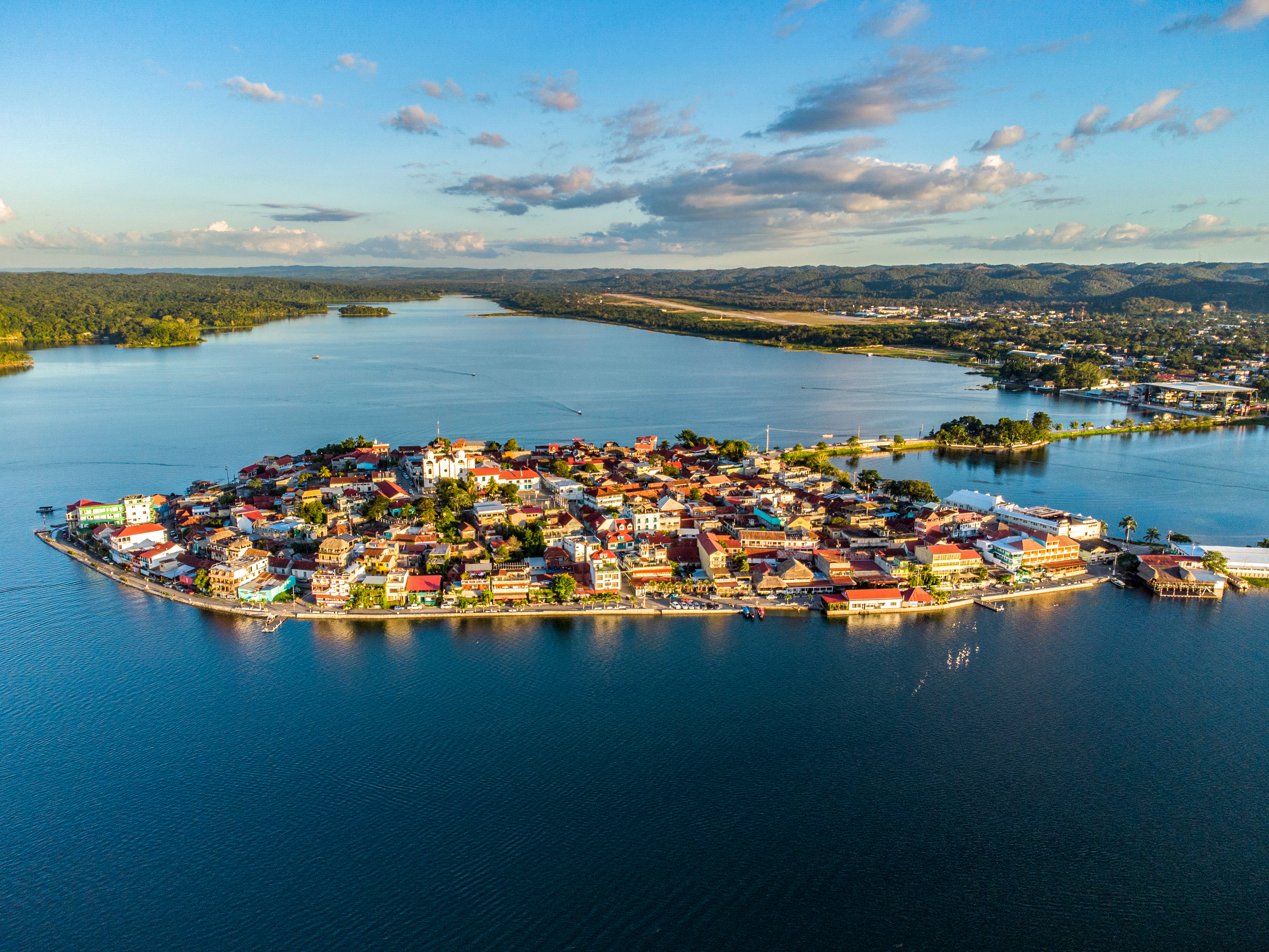
Flores.

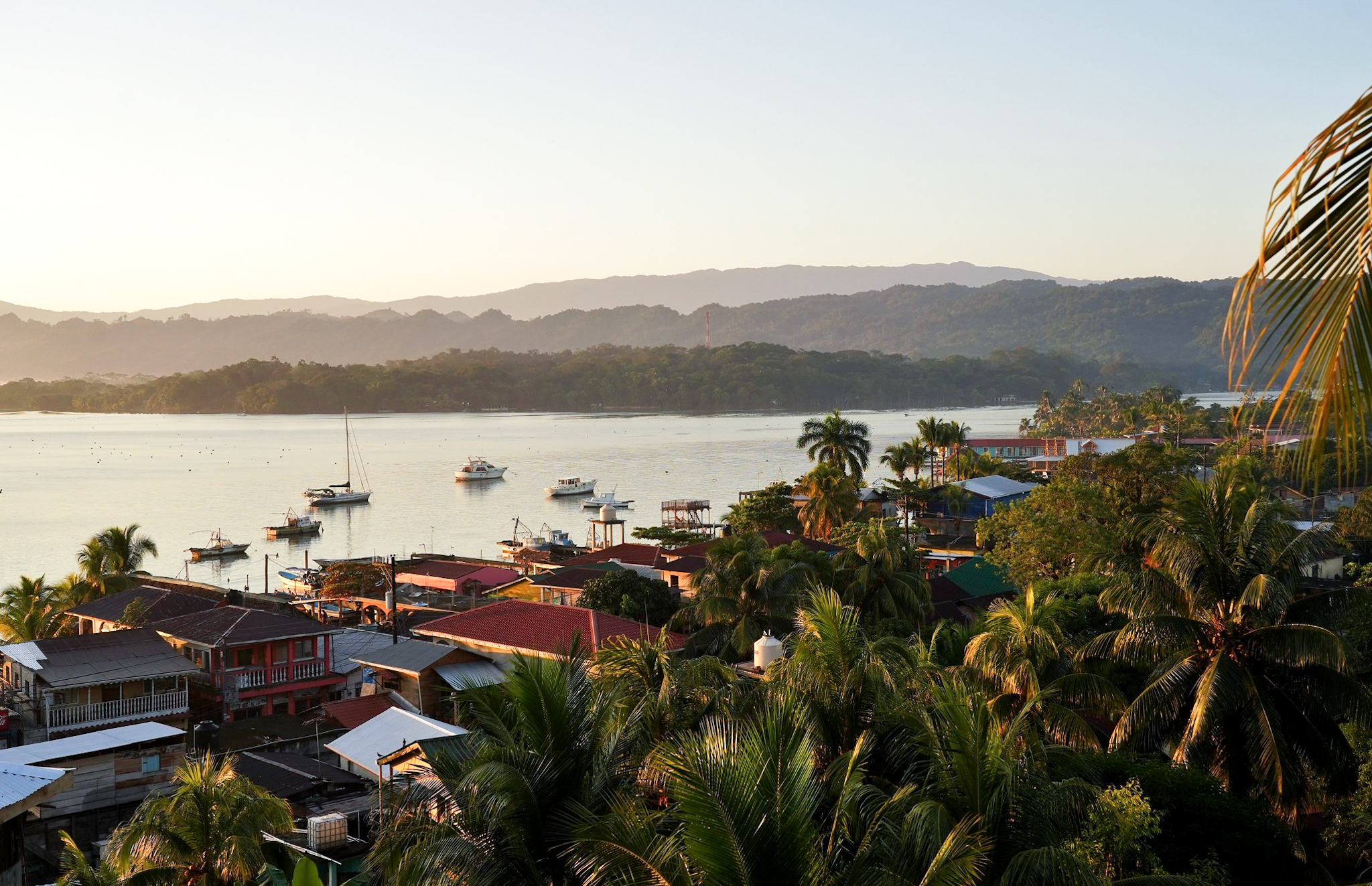
Livingston.

Rank	City/Town	Population	Department
1	Guatemala City	923,392	Guatemala
2	Mixco	465,773	Guatemala
3	Villa Nueva	433,734	Guatemala
4	Cobán	212,047	Alta Verapaz
5	Quetzaltenango	180,706	Quetzaltenango
6	Jalapa	159,840	Jalapa
7	Escuintla	156,313	Escuintla
8	San Juan Sacatepéquez	155,965	Guatemala
9	Jutiapa	145,880	Jutiapa
10	San Miguel Petapa	129,124	Guatemala
11	Villa Canales	124,680	Guatemala
12	Huehuetenango	117,818	Huehuetenango
13	Chiquimula	111,505	Chiquimula
14	Coatepeque	105,415	Quetzaltenango
15	Chinautla	104,972	Guatemala
16	Totonicapán	103,952	Totonicapán
17	Puerto Barrios	100,593	Izabal
18	Amatitlán	98,176	Guatemala
19	Chimaltenango	96,985	Chimaltenango
20	Retalhuleu	90,505	Retalhuleu
21	Santa Catarina Pinula	80,582	Guatemala
22	San José Pinula	79,844	Guatemala
23	Santa Cruz del Quiché	78,279	El Quiché
24	Mazatenango	77,431	Suchitepéquez
25	Chichicastenango	71,394	El Quiché
26	Zacapa	60,370	Zacapa
27	Santa Lucía Cotzumalguapa	58,877	Escuintla
28	San Pedro Ayampuc	58,609	Guatemala
29	San Francisco El Alto	57,894	Totonicapán
30	San Pedro Sacatepéquez	49,589	San Marcos
31	San Marcos	47,063	San Marcos
32	Antigua Guatemala	46,054	Sacatepéquez
33	Sololá	30,155	Sololá
34	Ciudad Vieja	25,226	Sacatepéquez
35	San Benito	24,792	Petén
36	Palín	24,680	Escuintla
37	Barberena	24,085	Santa Rosa
38	Jacaltenango	23,464	Huehuetenango
39	Momostenango	22,718	Totonicapán
40	Ostuncalco	22,113	Quetzaltenango
41	Santiago Sacatepéquez	19,520	Sacatepéquez
42	Fraijanes	19,454	Guatemala
43	Sumpango	18,910	Sacatepéquez
44	Santa Maria Nebaj	18,484	El Quiché
45	Esquipulas	18,368	Chiquimula
46	Olintepeque	18,150	Quetzaltenango
47	Salamá	18,080	Baja Verapaz
48	Tecpán Guatemala	17,788	Chimaltenango
49	Puerto San José	17,430	Escuintla
50	La Gomera	17,383	Escuintla
51	Patzún	17,346	Chimaltenango
52	Nahualá	17,174	Sololá
53	Cantel	17,121	Quetzaltenango
54	Tiquisate	16,801	Escuintla
55	Jocotenango	16,692	Sacatepéquez
56	San Cristóbal Verapaz	16,445	Alta Verapaz
57	San Andrés Itzapa	16,350	Chimaltenango
58	Chicacao	16,154	Suchitepéquez
59	Flores	16,122	Petén
60	Panzós	16,005	Alta Verapaz
61	Gualán	14,977	Zacapa
62	Colomba	14,948	Quetzaltenango
63	San Lucas Sacatepéquez	14,783	Sacatepéquez
64	Patzicía	14,496	Chimaltenango
65	Poptún	14,442	Petén
66	Asunción Mita	14,425	Jutiapa
67	Santa María de Jesús	14,418	Sacatepéquez
68	Alotenango	14,339	Sacatepéquez
69	Morales	14,231	Izabal
70	Palencia	14,164	Guatemala
71	Cuilapa	14,028	Santa Rosa
72	El Estor	14,019	Izabal
73	Sanarate	13,931	El Progreso
74	San Pablo Jocopilas	13,328	Suchitepéquez
75	Malacatán	12,891	San Marcos
76	Chisec	12,775	Alta Verapaz
77	La Democracia	12,718	Huehuetenango
78	San Lucas Tolimán	12,674	Sololá
79	San Pedro Sacatepéquez	12,673	Guatemala
80	El Tejar	12,498	Chimaltenango
81	San Sebastián	12,403	Retalhuleu
82	Chiquimulilla	12,001	Santa Rosa
83	San Pedro Carchá	11,941	Alta Verapaz
84	El Palmar	11,875	Quetzaltenango
85	Nuevo San Carlos	11,815	Retalhuleu
86	Santa Catalina la Tinta	11,722	Alta Verapaz
87	Comitancillo	11,679	San Marcos
88	Santa Cruz Barillas	11,379	Huehuetenango
89	Patulul	11,259	Suchitepéquez
90	La Esperanza	11,258	Quetzaltenango
91	Almolonga	11,131	Quetzaltenango
92	Salcajá	11,110	Quetzaltenango
93	Guastatoya	10,776	El Progreso
94	Nueva Concepción	10,677	Escuintla
95	Livingston	10,613	Izabal
96	Ayutla	10,570	San Marcos
97	San Francisco Zapotitlán	10,458	Suchitepéquez
98	Melchor de Mencos	10,299	Petén
99	Panajachel	10,238	Sololá
100	San Pablo	10,216	San Marcos
101	Chajul	10,095	El Quiché

== Ancient cities and important ruins ==
- Cancuén
- Dos Pilas
- El Baul
- Iximche
- Kaminaljuyu
- Machaquila
- El Mirador
- La Joyanca
- Mixco Viejo
- Naranjo
- Nakbé
- Piedras Negras
- Quirigua
- Q'umarkaj
- Tikal
- Uaxactún

== Natural features ==
- Caribbean Sea
- Pacific Ocean
- Volcán de Agua
- Volcán de Fuego

=== Lakes ===
Major lakes (lagos) in Guatemala
Lake	Location	Department (state administrative district)
Amatitlán	14.4500 -90.5667 (14°27'N ~ 90°34'W)	Guatemala
Atitlán	14.7000 -91.2000 (14°42'N ~ 91°12'W)	Sololá
Ayarza, Laguna de	14.4167 -90.1333 (14°25'N ~ 90°08'W)	Santa Rosa
El Golfete	15.7333 -88.8833 (15°44'N ~ 88°53'W)	Izabal
Izabal	15.5000 -89.1667 (15°30'N ~ 89°10'W)	Izabal
Peten Itzá	16.9833 -89.8333 (16°59'N ~ 89°50'W)	El Petén

== See also ==
- List of national parks of Guatemala
- Lists of cities in Central America
