= Balberta =

Archaeological site in Guatemala

Coordinates: 14°5′4″N 90°58′11″W

Balberta is a major Mesoamerican archaeological site on the Pacific coastal plain of southern Guatemala, belonging to the Maya civilization. It has been dated to the Early Classic period and is the only known major site on the Guatemalan Pacific coastal plain to have exposed Early Classic architecture that has not been buried under posterior Late Classic construction. The site was related to the nearby site of San Antonio, which lies 6 kilometres (3.7 mi) to the west.

Balberta first appears to have been occupied in the Late Preclassic period, when it was a small site of minor importance. After a period of rapid growth it became one of the largest Early Classic sites on the Guatemalan Pacific coast and reached the height of its power between AD 200 and AD 400, after which it rapidly declined and was replaced by a new capital at the nearby site of Montana. It traded with the distant metropolis of Teotihuacan in the Valley of Mexico, with other recovered artifacts having their origin on the Gulf coast of Mexico. Cacao was probably one of the city's main exports, being a particularly valued perishable product in Mesoamerica. At its height Balberta demonstrated true state-level political organisation and dominated a wide swathe of the Guatemalan coast. Balberta was suddenly abandoned around AD 400.

== Location ==
Balberta is located in the municipality of La Democracia in the department of Escuintla, approximately equidistant between the La Gomera and Achiguate rivers flowing down from the Guatemalan Highlands and about 19 kilometres (12 mi) from the coast and 90 kilometres (56 mi) southeast of the contemporary site of Kaminaljuyu. Balberta lies at an altitude of 34 metres (112 ft) above mean sea level on a flat coastal plain with a width of approximately 30 kilometres (19 mi). The soils of the plain are sandy sedimentary deposits, they are fertile and well-drained, supporting tropical vegetation and suitable for the cultivation of a variety of crops. The site lies on the lands of four plantations, the Santa Rita, San Carlos, Santa Mónica and San Patricio plantations, with the majority of the site occupying the first three of these. The plantations are dedicated to the cultivation of sugarcane, with the exception of the Santa Mónica plantation, which grows cotton and maize, depending on the season.

The entire area is crossed by north–south water-courses and there are some low-lying areas that form stagnant marshes in the wet season. The local topography is subject to constant change due to the seasonal flooding of the Achiguate River.

== Economy and trade ==
Obsidian recovered at Balberta was brought over long distances from central Mexico, with its origins at the Zaragoza source in Puebla state and the Pachuca source in Hidalgo, near to Teotihuacan itself. In fact the concentrations of green Pachuca obsidian are the highest recorded in Guatemala in the Early Classic. Most of the obsidian artifacts were associated with caches of ceramic vessels that contained ceramic effigies of cacao beans, all found within the site core and also containing small quantities of ceramics imported from Puebla in central Mexico. Although there is evidence that the site's wealth can be attributed at least in part to its far flung trade, there is no evidence that Teotihuacan directly intervened in order to found Balberta as a polity.

Pachuca obsidian from Balberta and the surrounding area represents the earliest evidence of contact with central Mexico in the region and its association with ceramic effigies of cacao probably marks the beginning of trade relations with Teotihuacan. Investigators have speculated that the cacao effigies and associated Pachuca obsidian may have been offerings to celebrate a trade agreement between the two cities, with cacao likely to have been the product being exported from Balberta.

== Balberta and Teotihuacan ==
As Teotihuacan became the dominant power in the Mesoamerican cultural region, the rulers of Balberta probably used their trade with central Mexico to gain an economic and military advantage over its own immediate neighbours and it is notable that the major city of Kaminaljuyu in the nearby Guatemalan Highlands showed a marked decline in wealth and population during the period of Balberta's zenith from AD 200 to AD 400.

Ten green Pachuca obsidian projectile points have been recovered from the Balberta site core, half of them from the area containing the ceremonial architecture and the rest from other ritual contexts or residential areas and all are in a pure Teotihuacan style. Pachuca obsidian and the associated ceramics have been dated to the period from AD 150 to AD 275, roughly contemporaneous with the Temple of the Feathered Serpent at Teotihuacan and the last period of construction of the Pyramid of the Moon.

The evidence from Balberta suggests that Teotihuacanos were physically present in the Balberta area for reasons of trade. At first Teotihuacan was attracted to the region in order to acquire exotic goods such as cacao, with commercial agreements benefiting Balberta. However, Teotihuacan eventually became more aggressive, resulting in the collapse of its former trading partner.

The fall of Balberta as a major centre may be attributed to a change in the external politics of Teotihuacan as it became a more aggressive player on the Mesoamerican stage and began to intervene directly in the Maya area, such as at Tikal. Teotihuacan appears to have founded Montana as a direct colony in the region, undermining Balberta's power and influence and leading to its decline. It has been suggested that the new Teotihuacan-controlled Montana polity engaged in expansionist warfare that resulted in the abrupt collapse of the Balberta state.

== The site ==
Balberta was a fortified site controlling a wide area, which it probably came to dominate through a process of aggressive warfare. The site has been investigated extensively by Frederick J. Bove. The centre of the site consists of a number of mounds built upon a large platform. The architectural style of the site shows a continuation of local tradition consisting of plazas with aligned structures that dates as far back as the Middle Preclassic, with some adaptation to the changing political situation in the region which necessitated the construction of defenses around the site core. The site core consists of 22 structures occupying an area of 18 hectares (1,900,000 sq ft).

The site core was defended by a wall starting at the southwest corner of Structure 1, surrounding the Mound Plaza on three sides, standing from 3 and 4 metres (9.8 and 13.1 ft) tall. Additionally, a deep ditch marks the east side of the site core, formed by redirecting a natural watercourse.

A 6-metre (20 ft) wide causeway started near Structure 3 and ran eastwards to a group of small structures.

Four projectile points were recovered from the Balberta site core that were fashioned from grey obsidian originating in central Mexico, three from Zaragoza in Puebla and one from Otumba in Mexico State. A number of burials at the site had small jade beads placed inside the mouth of the interred individual. More than 400 ceramic effigies of cocoa beans have been recovered during archaeological excavations of the site core.

Archaeologists have recovered 124 pieces of green obsidian from the site, most of which were blade fragments. The majority of the green obsidian artifacts were found in Structure 1, with 65% of them being contained in four caches in the structure.

During investigations carried out between 1984 and 1987, 26 burials were excavated, of which 23 were found under domestic structures. 24 of the burials were oriented east–west with the skull towards the west; the remaining 2 burials were oriented north–south with the skull to the north. The majority of the burials were covered with red pigment.

The Mound Plaza is a 2-metre (6.6 ft) high platform measuring 360 by 200 metres (1,180 by 660 ft) supporting 16 structures arranged in five rows. The westernmost row of structures is the only row containing Terminal Preclassic material in its fill, for which reason it is considered to be the original area of occupation at Balberta. This row consists of four structures; the rest consist of three structures each.

Structure 1 or the Great Platform is found immediately to the north of the Mound Plaza. It has sloping sides and a very wide upper surface. It underwent three main phases of construction. The earliest version of the structure consisted of a low platform of compacted clay, only 40 centimetres (16 in) high. Its exact dimensions are unknown but it was not as large as in the later phases. The second phase involved a major construction effort, the platform being expanded to 3 metres (9.8 ft) in height and covering almost the same surface area as the final version of the platform. This final version was built up by using layers of compacted clay separated by thin layers of sand and soft clay. The final dimensions of the platform were 190 by 160 metres (620 by 520 ft), divided between two levels known as the Low Platform and the High Platform, the higher level being 7 metres (23 ft) high and the lower part being 4 metres (13 ft) high. The higher section of the platform consists of 76,800 cubic metres (2,710,000 ft^{3}) of fill deposited in a single construction phase. It is topped by various low mounds that have been identified as elite residences. The lower section was non-residential in nature although elite burials were discovered as well as ceremonial offerings. One of these elite burials was accompanied by a green obsidian projectile point, a black obsidian spear point, ceramic earspools, an urn, a spindle whirl and a ceramic bowl.

Structure 4 is located in the Mound Plaza.

Structure 8 is also located in the Mound Plaza.

Structure 10 occupies the centre of the Mound Plaza. It is the highest structure in the plaza and is a pyramid measuring 8 metres (26 ft) high and 68 metres (223 ft) across at the base. The structure had at least six phases of construction, each being built on top of the previous and with the earliest yet identified being 4 metres (13 ft) high.

Structure 13 is located in the Mound Plaza. It demonstrates several construction phases.

Structure 21 is the second largest structure at the site, after Structure 1.

== See also ==
- Chocolá
- Southern Maya area
- Takalik Abaj
