= Chocolá =

Maya site in Suchitepéquez, Guatemala

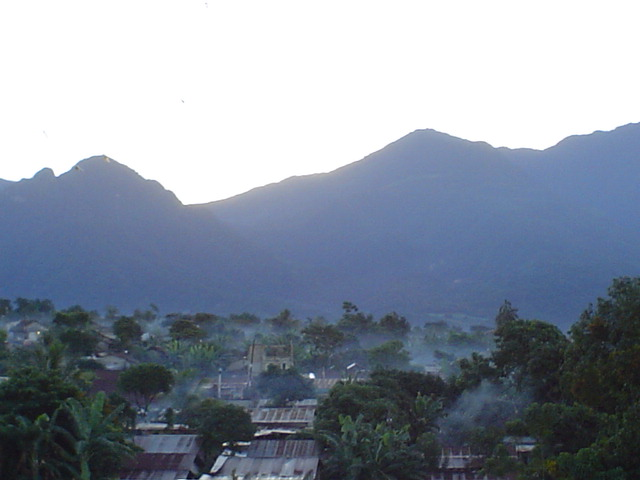
- Modern Village of Chocolá

- Location within Guatemala
- 14.616944°N 91.428333°W
- Periods: Preclassic, Classic
- Cultures: Maya civilization
- Location: San Pablo Jocopilas, Suchitepéquez, Guatemala
- Region: Southern Maya area

Site notes
- Area: 2 km × 6 km (1.2 mi × 3.7 mi)

Chocolá is a Preclassic Southern Maya site whose developmental emphasis was from c. 1000 BC to AD 200. The site lies within the Southern Maya area.

Chocolá is in the San Pablo Jocopilas municipality in the southern Suchitepéquez Department of Guatemala. A modern village lies on top of and within the ancient site.

== Importance of the site ==
Lying on a plateau below volcanic mountain ridges to the north and east, and at a height of 500–1000 meters, the site consists of three general groupings extending over c. 6 by 2 kilometers, oriented north-to-south. To the north, great platform mounds consisted of elite residences, with elaborate hydraulic networks of stone-lined canals bringing water in from underground springs.

Excavation of Mound 5, Chocola

In these precincts, large palaces were built; from Structure 7-1, c. 25 by 25 meters and 5 meters high, caches of fine complete vessels were recovered, likely dedicatory offerings placed during the construction of the edifice.

In the ancient central district further south, pyramidal mounds up to 25 meters held administrative structures. Archaeoastronomical research has tentatively identified crucial alignments from structures in the administrative center of the city that reflect primordial measurements that underlay development of the Maya calendar. Still further south, flatter areas contained commoner houses and workshops. Thus far, hundreds of thousands of artifacts have been found, including many whole vessels, sculptured monuments and altars, and figurines, most dating to the Preclassic. Around the site are caves still sacred to local ritualists.

Researchers have hypothesized that one reason for the early development of such high complexity at Chocolá is the intensive cultivation of cacao for long-distance trade. Based on older as well as still accumulating evidence, scholars assume that innovative developments occurred in the southern Mesoamerican area during the Preclassic period (1500 BC – AD 200) that strongly influenced the later great Mesoamerican civilizations. However, scholars lack a clear sense of even the broader events and processes that shaped southern Guatemala's history and gave it its peculiar and, as long assumed, seminal character. Investigations at Kaminaljuyu, in the central Guatemalan highlands, and Takalik Abaj, in southwestern Guatemala, over recent decades showed the strong relationship between these two regions. These centers, along with other nearby sites, like Chocolá, participated in distinct political networks and shared ideologies, technologies, and economics.

Chocola also participated in the potbelly sculpture tradition. One such monument was found there.

== Archaeological investigations ==
Excavation of stone drains at Chocolá

A complex of more than 100 structures was discovered by Karl Sapper in the last years of the 19th century and a few mounds were excavated by Robert Burkitt in the 1920s. The discovery by Burkitt of Monument 1, a stela carved in the "Miraflores" style, sparked interest among scholars, suggestive as it was that Chocolá may have been an important polity early on with distinct political connections with Kaminaljuyu. This stela bears extraordinary similarities both in style and content to Kaminaljuyu Stela 10, a gigantic throne and the site's single largest monument. In 2003, long-term excavations were initiated by the Proyecto Arqueologico Chocola (PACH). These investigations are exploring the social and cultural developments that led to the rise of the Classic Maya, with sophisticated city-states, hieroglyphic literacy, exquisite ceramics, and the most advanced mathematics and astronomy in the New World.

Also in 2003 a large portion of work was focused on the division of Chocolá into three different sectors, a northern elite sector, a central administrative sector, and a southern commoner and agricultural sector. In succeeding field seasons, evidence from the first field season of subterranean water conduits was expanded to reveal an extensive water management system. Also, excavations of three structures in the north sector of the city of large, grouped edifices and platforms, included one very large elite palace structure. Excavations in the central, presumed administrative sector of particularly large pyramidal mounds revealed a very early (Middle Preclassic, or c. 800 BC) earthen edifice. In the southern sector, excavation of a very large platform with a cobble wall recovered evidence suggesting agricultural management.

In 2017, cacao residues in ten vessels from the site, all Preclassic in style, were identified at the Hershey Company laboratory, lending greater weight to the theory that cacao arboriculture existed at Chocolá early in the trajectory of Maya civilization. If Chocolá grew cacao intensively, it likely would have traded this commodity, so highly valued by the ancient Maya and other ancient Mesoamerican cultures. Given the long-standing accumulation of evidence of high or advanced hallmark traits of Maya civilization - writing, the stela-altar complex and "kingship", the Maya calendar - appearing first in the Southern Maya Region, PACH investigators have proposed a material basis for the emergence of at least some of these traits, based on the discovery of the sophisticated water management system and of possible cacao cultivation and trade.

== Water and chocolate ==
Chocolá Structure 15 and associated stone drain

Discovered between 2003 and 2005, networks of stone-lined or stone-enclosed drains and conduits, extending at least 1.5 kilometers, demonstrate sophisticated hydraulics. Radiocarbon dating situates the system in the Late Middle Preclassic period, or as early as 500 BC. Early and later Post-Conquest ethnohistory attests that Soconusco, Suchitepéquez, and Escuintla were important centers for the production of cacao, a high water-demand plant. The same ethnohistory records very dense populations at the time of the Conquest and fierce fighting between various caciques for control of cacao in an area where today one finds Mazatenango, Cuyotenango, Zapotitlán, San Antonio, and Samayac, all indicated by ethnohistory to have been significant centers of cacao production and trade, and all clustered closely around the Chocolá site. While such ethnohistoric information cannot be relied on as direct evidence to characterize events and processes from millennia earlier, it seems reasonable to use these data as a guide for what one could look for, including evidence of large-scale exchange, perhaps most plausibly, of obsidian for cacao. If, indeed, archaeological evidence can be found to support intensive cacao cultivation at and around Chocolá, a yet stronger case will be made for the Southern Maya area as crucial to the rise of Maya civilization.
