= Montana (Mesoamerican site) =

Mesoamerican archaeological site in southern Guatemala

Montana is a Mesoamerican archaeological site on the Pacific coastal plain of southern Guatemala. It is located in the department of Escuintla, near Balberta, and is one of the largest Mesoamerican archaeological sites on the Pacific Coast of Guatemala.

== History ==
Around AD 400, in the Early Classic period, Montana replaced Balberta as the regional capital. The investigating archaeologists consider that Montana was founded as a colony by the great metropolis of Teotihuacan in the distant Valley of Mexico in order to supply that city with locally produced products such as cacao, cotton and rubber and to provide a trade route to the great highland city of Kaminaljuyu and to the Maya lowlands across the Sierra Madre de Chiapas.

The establishment of the Teotihuacan colony at Montana resulted in the collapse of the important nearby site of Balberta and the new capital flourished until about AD 600, dominating the region for about 200 years. This coincides with the period of Teotihuacan contact at Kaminaljuyu. The production of local copies of Teotihuacan artifacts ceased by the close of the Early Classic, coinciding with widespread destruction in the centre of Teotihuacan and the decline of that city and indicating the end of Montana as a colony.

By the Late Classic, the Montana polity had fragmented into several smaller polities, and around AD 800 it was replaced as a regional capital by Cotzumalhuapa.

The ruins of the city were discovered in 1982 by the archaeologist Frederick J. Bove of the Proyecto Costa Sur (South Coast Project). At the time of discovery, the site was still covered by tropical forest. Although test pits were sunk soon after the site's discovery, serious investigation of the site did not start until 1991.

== The site ==
The site core covers an area of about 1 square kilometre (0.39 sq mi) and contains a number of enormous earth constructions. The extended urban area of the site covered at least 10 square kilometres (3.9 sq mi) and possessed a high density of structures. The site core had a complex drainage system that channelled runoff rainwater through sections of ceramic pipe in order to maintain the structural integrity of the architecture. Each section of ceramic pipe measures roughly 1 metre (3.3 ft) long and between 15 and 20 centimetres (5.9 and 7.9 in) in diameter.

The Central Platform is 7 metres (23 ft) high and measures 200 by 220 metres (660 by 720 ft). It is topped by a temple pyramid that measures 18 metres (59 ft) high, with a stairway ascending the western side.

A plaza in the northern portion of the site core is enclosed by platforms and pyramids. An artificial platform supports a second, 300-metre-long (980 ft) plaza running south to the Los Chatos platform.

The Los Chatos platform measures 200 by 330 metres (660 by 1,080 ft) and is a massive dual-level platform occupying the southern portion of the site core. Excavations of the platform uncovered a series of 25 floor surfaces laid on top of each other. The investigations uncovered the only complete Teotihuacan-style censer ever recovered from a controlled excavation in the entire Pacific Coastal region of Guatemala. The censer has been dated to the period AD 350–400. The censer is of fine quality and contained four rough jade beads, each measuring about 5 millimetres (0.20 in) across.

Mound 2 is a 3-metre-high (9.8 ft) mound lying immediately to the west of the Los Chatos platform. It is here that the Teotihuacan-style censer was recovered; it had been deposited in a pit sunk into the centre of the floor. Local looters reported that they extracted a large number of artifacts from caches and burials within the structure.

Mound 3 — lying just south of Mound 2 — consists of the remains of a residential complex containing various rooms.

Within a 5-kilometre (3.1 mi) radius of the site core, 13 more large platforms have been recorded. Excavations at Montana have revealed evidence of contact with the great metropolis of Teotihuacan.

Artifacts recovered from Montana include ceramic vessels and effigy censers that are local copies of Teotihuacan-style artifacts. The presence of these artifacts supports the idea that Teotihuacan colonists were physically present at the site and that they commissioned local artisans to make artifacts for their use.

== Satellite sites ==
Montana has a number of satellite sites that formed a part of the polity. These included the sites of La Fronda, Las Hortencias, Loma Linda, Manantial, Paraiso and Las Victorias.

=== Manantial ===
Manantial lies 1 kilometre (0.62 mi) north of the site core of Montana. The area between the two sites contains over 200 mounds including both elite and commoner residential areas and large platforms measuring up to 100 metres (330 ft) wide.

== See also ==
- Takalik Abaj
