= Suchitepéquez =

Suchitepéquez may refer to:

- Suchitepéquez Department, a department in Guatemala
- Suchitepéquez District, a district in Sololá-Suchitepéquez Department
- C.D. Suchitepéquez, a sports club
