= Zunilito =

Coordinates: 14°37′N 91°31′W

Zunilito (Spanish pronunciation: [suniˈlito]) is a municipality in the Suchitepéquez department of Guatemala. It is situated at 790 m above sea level. It covers an area of 78 km^{2}.
