= San Bernardino, Suchitepéquez =

Coordinates: 14°32′N 91°27′W

San Bernardino (Spanish pronunciation: [sam beɾˈnaɾðino]) is a municipality in the Suchitepéquez department of Guatemala. It is known for Los Shapos, a longtime religious and cultural tradition celebrated on 16 July that involves music, decorations, and marching the streets dressed in various costumes.
