= San Miguel Panán =

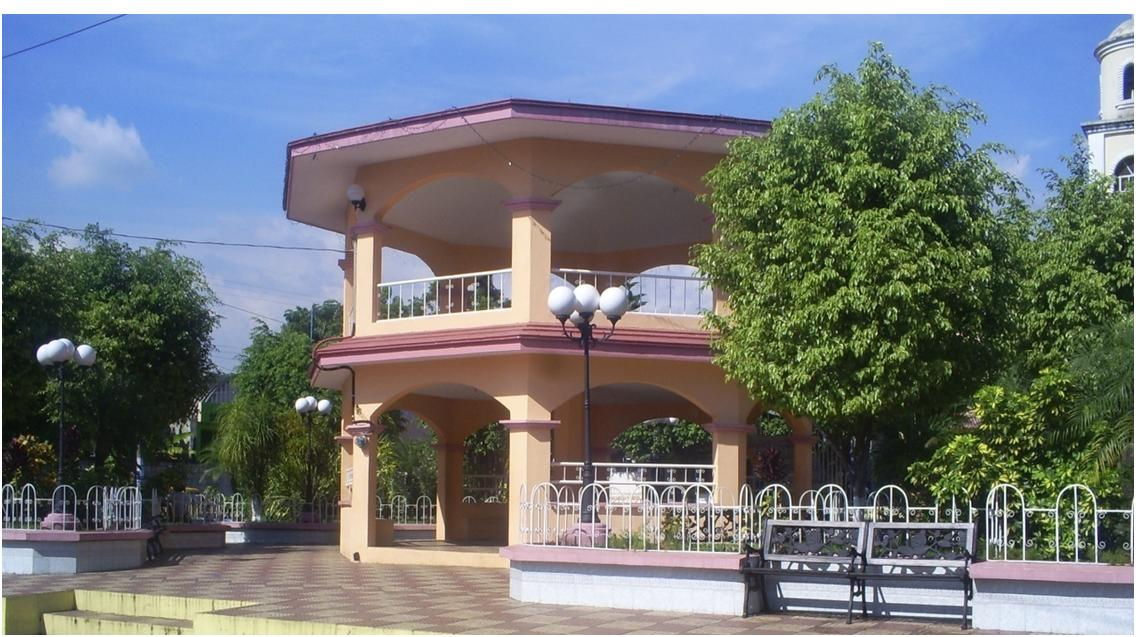
- Parque Central de San Miguel Panán
- Interactive map of San Miguel Panán
- Coordinates: 14.53°N 91.37°W
- Country: Guatemala
- Department: Suchitepéquez

Population (2013)
  - Total: 8,506

San Miguel Panán (Spanish pronunciation: [ˈsam miˈɣel paˈnan]) is a municipality in the Suchitepéquez department of Guatemala. It is situated at 730 m above sea level. It contains 15,000 people. It covers a terrain of 40 km².
