= Pueblo Nuevo, Suchitepéquez =

Coordinates: 14.65°N 91.5333°W

Pueblo Nuevo is a municipality in the department of Suchitepéquez, in the south-west region of the Republic of Guatemala.

== Geography ==
Pueblo Nuevo is located in the department of Suchitepéquez at a distance of 14 km from the departmental capital Mazatenango.
