= San José El Idolo =

Coordinates: 14°27′N 91°25′W

- Interactive map of San José El Idolo
- Country: Guatemala

San José El Idolo (Spanish pronunciation: [saŋ xoˈse el ˈiðolo]) is a municipality in the Suchitepéquez department of Guatemala. It has an area of 82 km^{2} (32 sq mi) and is at an altitude of 170 m. It contains 11,000 people.
