= San Juan Bautista, Suchitepéquez =

Coordinates: 14°25′N 91°11′W

San Juan Bautista is a municipality in the Suchitepéquez department of Guatemala.
