= Santo Tomás La Unión =

Coordinates: 14°38′N 91°23′W

Santo Tomás La Unión is a municipality in the Suchitepéquez department of Guatemala.
