= San Gabriel, Suchitepéquez =

Coordinates: 14.5167°N 91.5167°W

San Gabriel
- Municipality
- Interactive map of San Gabriel
- Country: Guatemala
- Guatemala: Suchitepéquez

Area
  - Municipality: 5.53 km^{2} (2.14 sq mi)

Population (2018 census)
  - Municipality: 7,383
  - Density: 1,340/km^{2} (3,460/sq mi)
  - Urban: 6,599

San Gabriel is a town and municipality in the Suchitepéquez department of Guatemala.
