= Santa Bárbara, Suchitepéquez =

Coordinates: 14.4333°N 91.2333°W

Santa Bárbara is a town, with a population of 17,172 (2018 census), and a municipality in the Suchitepéquez department of Guatemala. The municipality is situated at 140 metres above sea level, with a population of 26,346 (2018 census). It covers an area of 186 km².
