= Guatemalan Highlands =

Geographical region of Mesoamerica

Tierras altas (highlands) of Guatemala

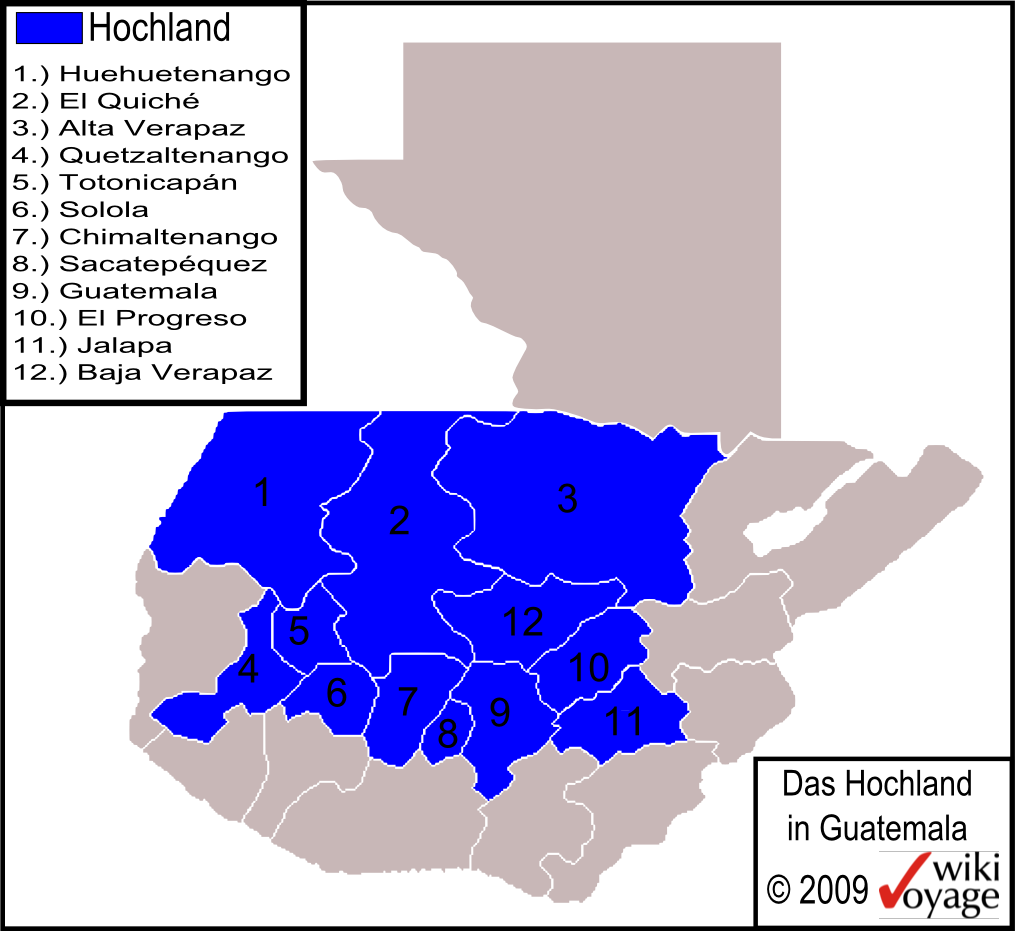
Departments of the Guatemalan Highlands

The Guatemalan Highlands is an upland region in southern Guatemala which lies between the Sierra Madre de Chiapas to the south and the Petén lowlands to the north.

== Geographic description ==
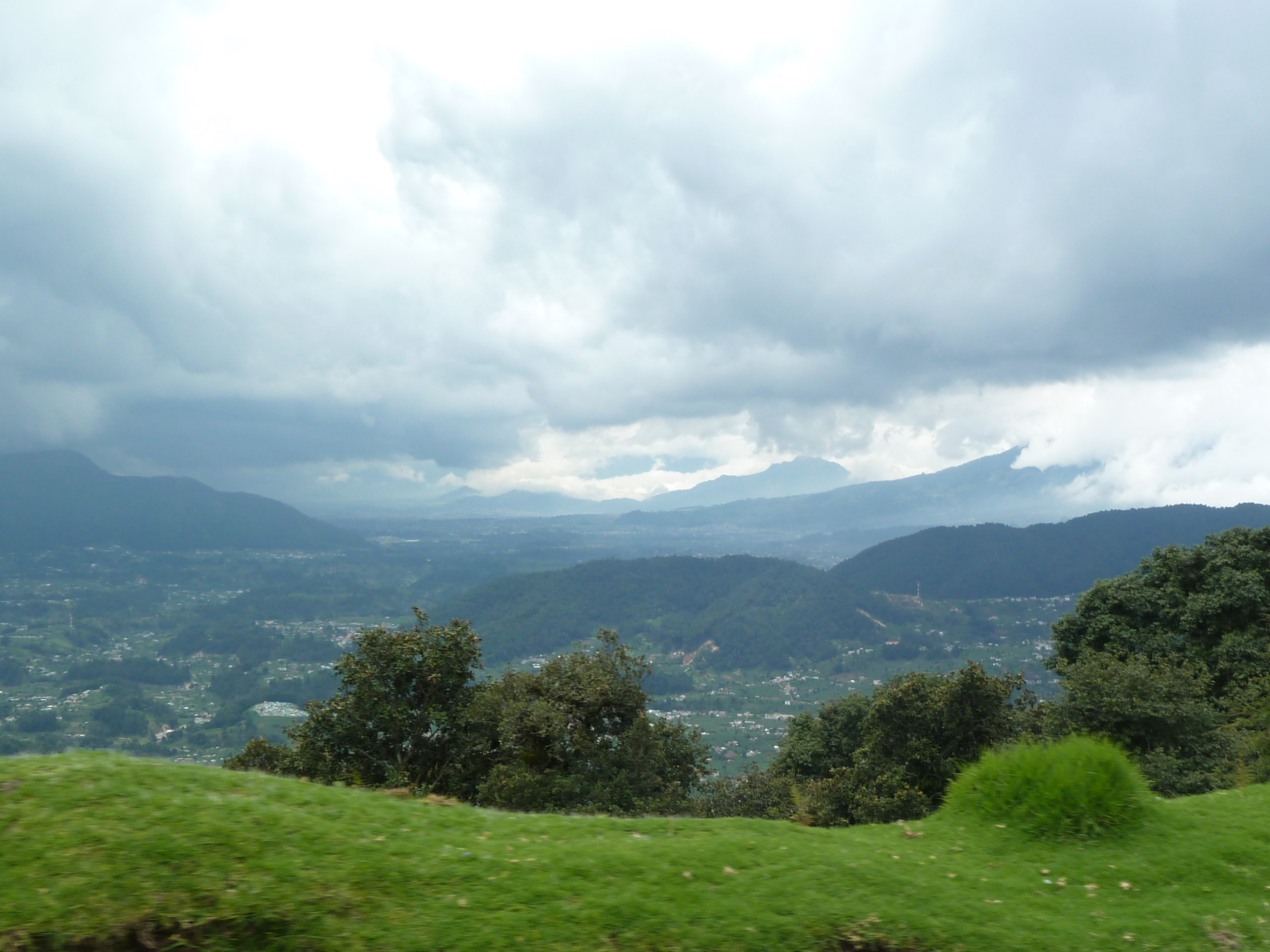
View from Quetzaltenango

The Highlands lie between 1,940 metres (6,360 ft) ft and 4,200 metres (13,800 ft) and are made up of a series of high valleys enclosed by mountains. There are volcanoes which are both active and extinct. The local name for the region is Altos, meaning "highlands."

The relief of the mountainous country which is north of the Highlands and drains into the Atlantic is varied by terraces, ridges, and underfalls. Its general configuration is compared by E. Reclus to the appearance of "a stormy sea breaking into parallel billows". A range called the Sierra de Chamá travels eastward towards Belize and is connected by low hills with the Cockscomb Mountains. The Sierra de Santa Cruz, a similar range, continues east to Cape Cocoli between the Polochic and the Sarstoon rivers. A third, the Sierra de las Minas, or its eastern portion, Sierra del Mico, stretches between the Polochic and the Motagua rivers. Between Honduras and Guatemala, the frontier is formed by the Sierra de Merendón.

A few of the streams of the Pacific slope actually rise in the highlands pushing through the Sierra Madre at the bottom of deep ravines. A large river, the Chixoy or Salinas River, flows northwards towards the Gulf of Mexico. In addition to the streams which break through to the Pacific, a number of larger streams which drain to the Gulf of Mexico or the Caribbean Sea have their sources in the highlands. The Motagua River, whose principal head stream is called the Rio Grande, has a course of about 400 kilometres (250 mi), and is navigable to within 140 km (90 mi) of Guatemala City which is situated on one of its confluents, the Rio de las Vacas. It empties in the Gulf of Honduras, an arm of the Caribbean. Of similar importance is the Polochic River, which is about 290 km (180 mi) in length, and navigable about 32 km (20 mi) above the river-port of Telemán. A vast number of streams, among which are the Chixoy, Lacantún, and Ixcán, unite to form the Usumacinta River, which passes along the Mexican frontier, and flows on through Chiapas and Tabasco into the Bay of Campeche. The Grijalva and its tributaries the Cuilco and San Miguel rivers drain west into the Chiapas Depression and from there into the Gulf of Mexico. Lake Atitlan is a land-locked basin encompassed with lofty mountains. About 14 km (9 mi) south of Guatemala City lies Lake Amatitlán and the town of Amatitlán.

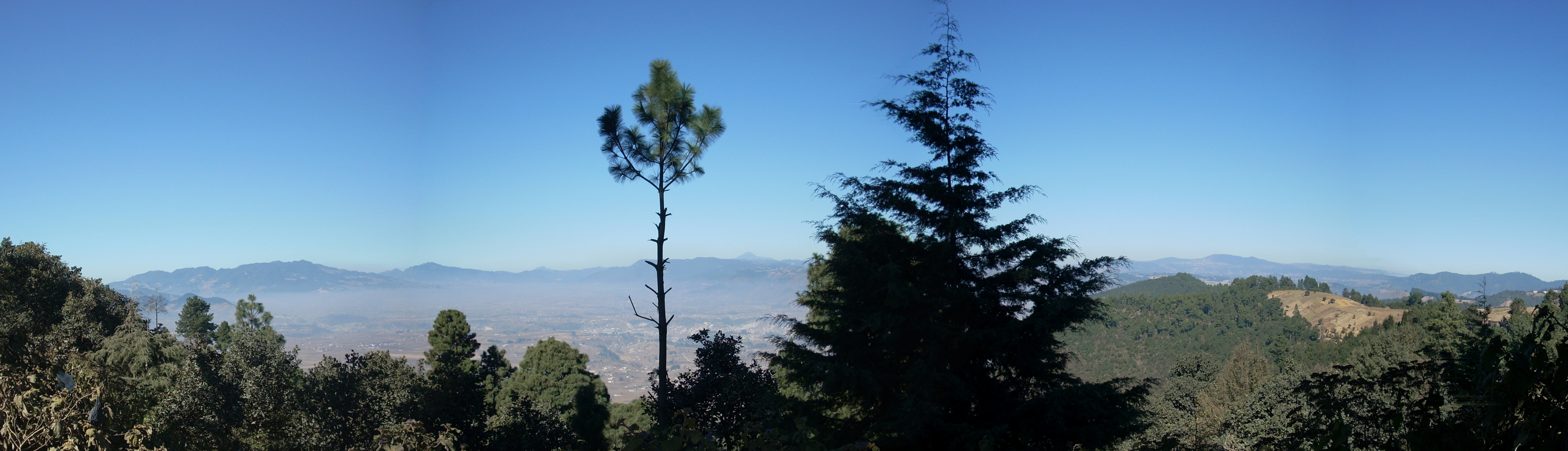
A panorama of the Guatemalan highlands is shown near Quetzaltenango. The mountain at left is the Siete Orejas volcano. The Tajumulco volcano is visible as a distant cone in the centre of the photo.

== Climate ==
The Highlands have a more temperate climate compared to the surrounding lowlands and Pacific coastal plains. Their annual temperatures fall between 15° and 25°C. In this climate, there are typically pronounced rainy and dry seasons. The rainy season lasts from May to November, with the heaviest rainfall happening in June and October.

== Cultural history ==
One of the prevalent groups which has been present in the Guatemalan Highlands is the Maya civilization, specifically in the Southern Maya area. They rose to importance around A.D. 250 and then declined beginning around A.D. 850. The area is inhabited by the Maya peoples to this day.

=== Farming and Agriculture ===
The Guatemalan Highlands were a significant source of raw materials for the Maya society; farming and agriculture dominated the region. The highlands provided the Maya with various minerals which were culturally important including jade and serpentine. In addition to these minerals, fertile landscapes were created by large amounts of rainfall during the rainy season of the Guatemalan Highlands(May-December). Canals were built and maintained to use a raised field system of agriculture that took advantage of the ecology of the landscape. Households grew their food in open areas and the surplus of these agricultural products was traded in community markets.

In the Highlands, various fruits, vegetables, flowers, and coffee were traded throughout the Maya society. The Maya had maize fields that were called milpas, which grew different types of maize in addition to squashes, beans, and manioc. The lowlands are often considered the center of the Maya society, but it is important to recognize that the Guatemalan Highlands also provided a vital source of agricultural products sustaining the Mayan population.

=== Cultural significance ===
An important Pre-Maya site located in the Highlands is Kaminaljuyu. It was a huge settlement, complete with big structures, organization, and cities.

The Highlands were significant to the Maya for a variety of reasons. First, at one point, there was only one Mayan language, Proto-Mayan, which likely originated in the Highlands. Over time, various dialects of the language separated spreading across the rest of the Maya area. They were also significant because of their large lakes, or more specifically, the Maya cave sites near these lakes, which sometimes were ritual pilgrimage places for the Maya. The lakes were popular sites to live by, as they made water more accessible to the Maya. Many birds were trapped by the Maya for their feathers in the Highlands. These feathers were traded and used in headdresses, crests, and capes, as well as to decorate shields, spears, scepters, canopies, fans, and clothing, as they were a sign of elite status.

This elite regalia was closely integrated into the highland backstrap weaving tradition (telar de cintura), where luxury materials and complex brocaded motifs were structurally woven into huipiles to signify social rank, territorial identity, and cosmological order.

== See also ==
- Altiplano
- Geography of Guatemala
- Maya Highlands
