= El Portón =

El Portón is a site of the Preclassic Mesoamerican civilisation, literate and thought to be Maya.

It lies in the Salamá valley.

By 500 BCE, the inhabitants built terraces which allowed a more scalable population. They built temples (of earth). They dedicated the largest temple with "feasting, bloodletting, and burning of incense".

The inscriptions on a stele dateable via radiology to 400 BCE are likely in a Mayan language; if so, it is the earliest such attestation.
