= Samayac =

Coordinates: 14°35′N 91°28′W

- Municipality
- Interactive map of Samayac
- Country: Guatemala
- Department: Suchitepéquez

Area
  - Municipality: 24.3 km^{2} (9.4 sq mi)

Population (2018 census)
  - Municipality: 24,790
  - Density: 1,020/km^{2} (2,640/sq mi)
  - Urban: 9,681

Samayac is a town and municipality in the Suchitepéquez department of Guatemala. It lies at an elevation of 615 metres above sea level and covers an area of 24.3 km².
