= Chicacao =

Coordinates: 14.5333°N 91.3167°W

- Municipality
- Location in Guatemala
- Country: Guatemala
- Department: Suchitepéquez Department

Area
  - Total: 86 sq mi (224 km^{2})

Population (2018 census)
  - Total: 60,735
  - Density: 702/sq mi (271/km^{2})

Chicacao is a town and municipality in the Suchitepéquez department of Guatemala. It is situated at 600 metres above sea level. The town has a population of 26,309 (2018 census). Originally a German settlement, it is famous for a clock that is now over 100 years old.
