= San Pablo Jocopilas =

Coordinates: 14°35′N 91°27′W

- Municipality
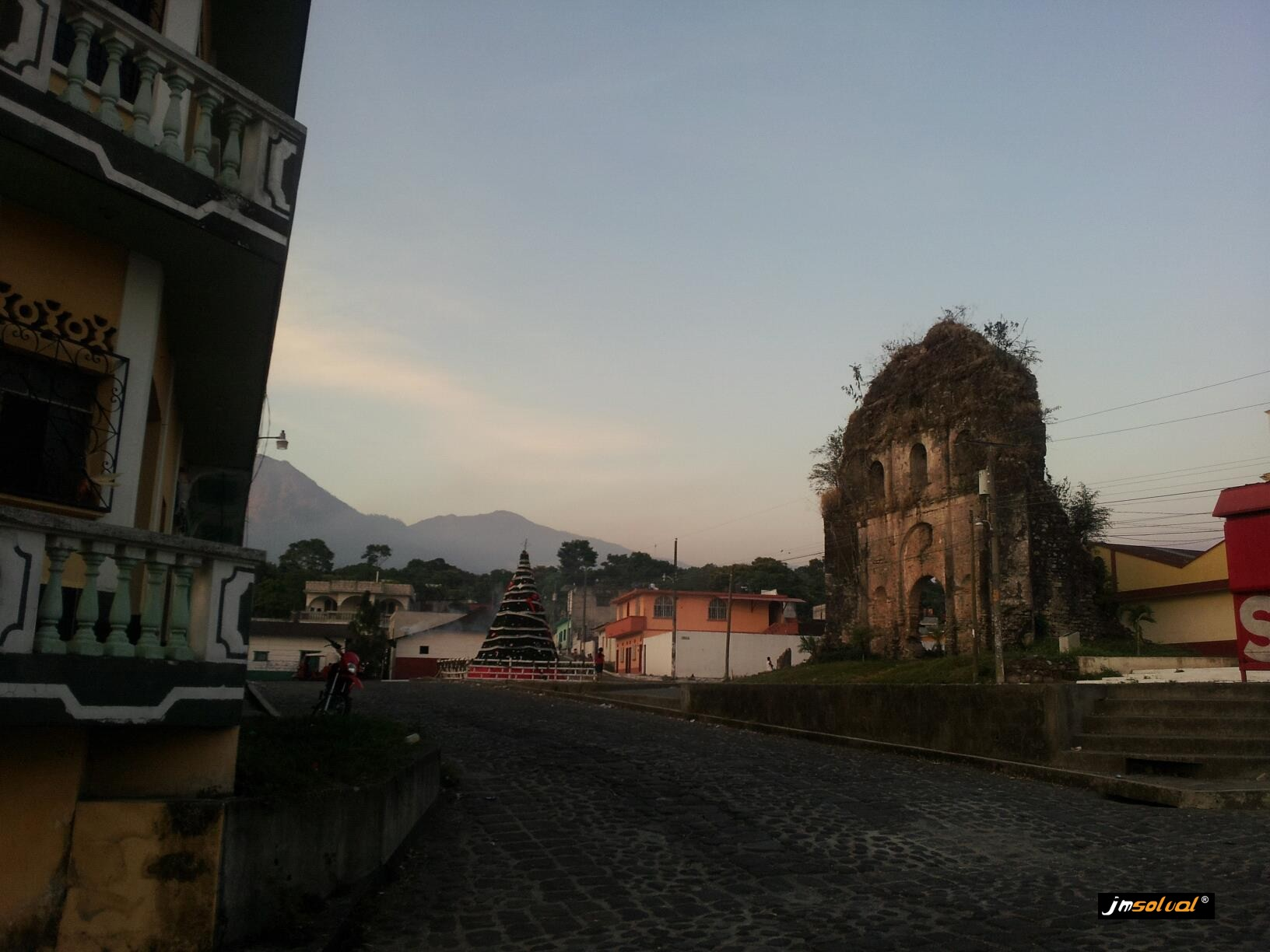

- Location in Guatemala
- Country: Guatemala
- Department: Suchitepéquez Department

Area
  - Total: 10.1 sq mi (26.1 km^{2})

Population (2018 census)
  - Total: 20,433
  - Density: 2,030/sq mi (783/km^{2})

San Pablo Jocopilas is a town, with a population of 16,872 (2018 census), and a municipality east-northeast of Samayac and west of highway CA 2 in the Suchitepéquez department of Guatemala, located 8 km from Mazatenango, which is the department's capital. The Colonial Church was chosen as one of the seven most wonderful in Guatemala in a contest run by the Industrial Bank. San Pablo Jocopilas also boasts other monuments, such as the centenary clock of Chocolá, built in 1800. The commune is located along the banks of the Ixtacapa River, which is a popular tourist spot during the holidays.
