= San Francisco Zapotitlán =

Coordinates: 14°35′N 91°31′W

- Municipality
- Location in Guatemala
- Country: Guatemala
- Department: Suchitepéquez Department

Area
  - Total: 17.7 sq mi (45.8 km^{2})

Population (2018 census)
  - Total: 22,533
  - Density: 1,270/sq mi (492/km^{2})

San Francisco Zapotitlán (Spanish pronunciation: [saɱ fɾanˈsisko sapotiˈtlan]) is a town, with a population of 18,468 (2018 census), and a municipality in the Suchitepéquez department of Guatemala.
