= Kaminaljuyu =

Ancient Mayan city in Guatemala City, Guatemala

Coordinates: 14°37′58.08″N 90°32′56.76″W

- Kaminaljuyu and other Preclassic sites Location in Guatemala
- Race: Maya
- Religion: Maya
- Geographical range: Southern Maya area
- Period: Preclassic and Classic
- Dates: 1500 BC to 1200 CE
- Characteristics: Use of hardened adobe to build instead of limestone

Kaminaljuyu (pronounced /kæminælˈhuːjuː/; from Quiché, "The Hill of the Dead") is a Pre-Columbian site of the Maya civilization located in Guatemala City. Primarily occupied from 1500 BC to 1200 AD, it has been described as one of the greatest archaeological sites in the New World—although the extant remains are distinctly unimpressive. Debate continues about its size, integration, and role in the surrounding Valley of Guatemala and the Southern Maya area.

Kaminaljuyu, when first mapped scientifically, comprised some 200 platforms and pyramidal mounds. The site was largely swallowed up by real estate developments. A portion of the Classic Period center is preserved as a 0.5 square km park—a fraction of the original ruins field size of around 5 square km.

== Archaeological excavations ==
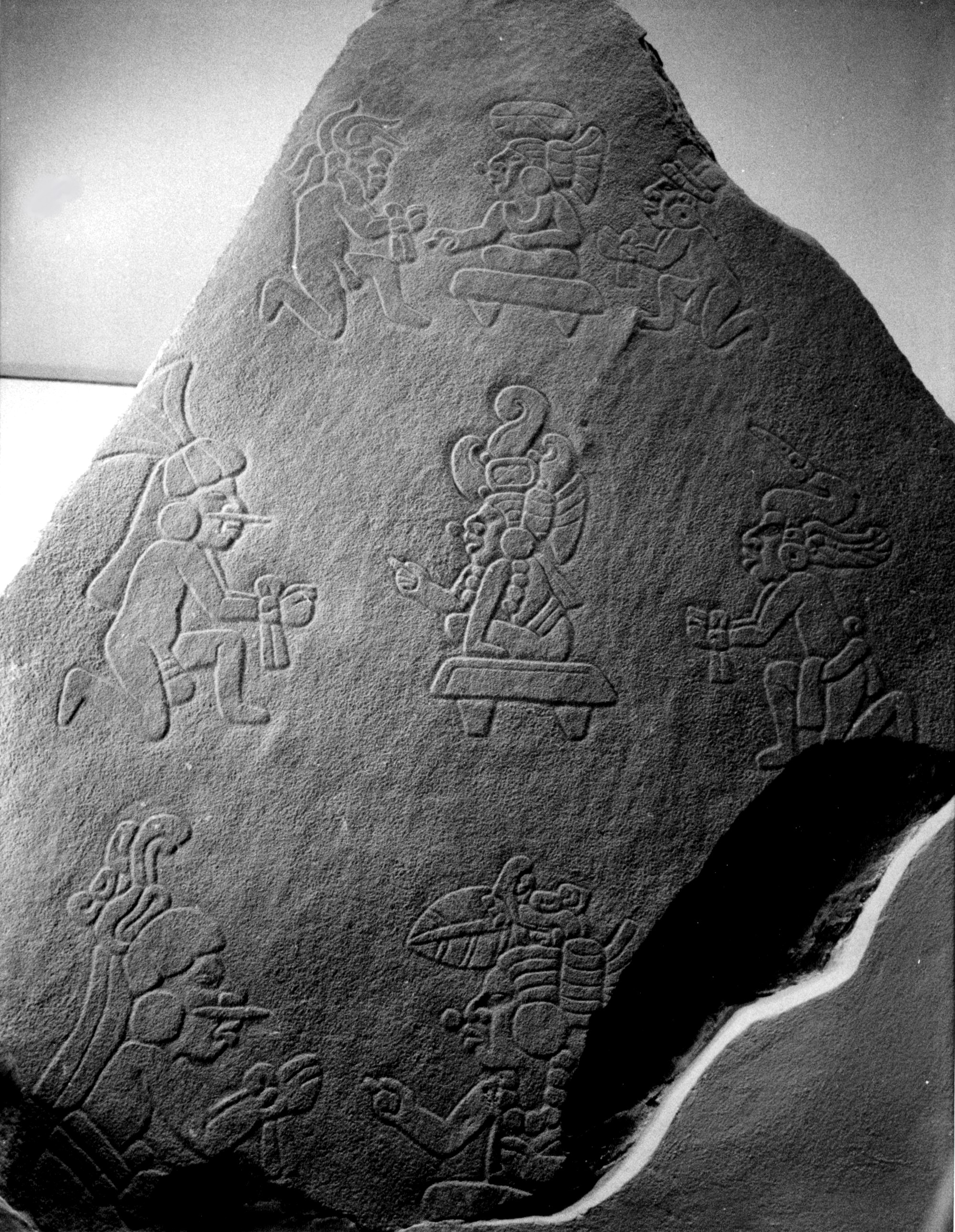
Kaminaljuyu Monument 65, 290 by 200 by 33 cm

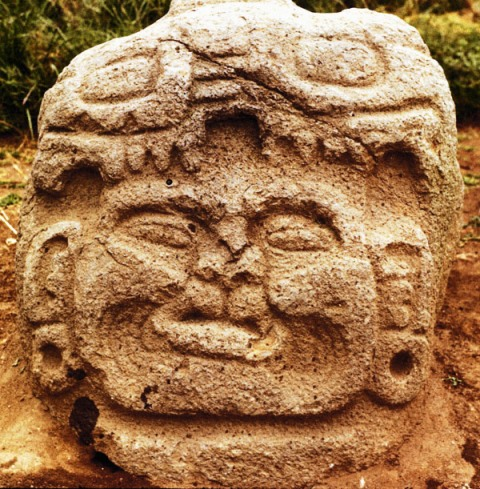
Late Preclassic sculpted head, found in Kaminaljuyú. Currently on the Museo Nacional de Arqueología (National Archaeological Museum, Guatemala).

The extant remains are distinctly unimpressive and are in a state of destruction with almost daily erasure of material. This is due to their location beneath urbanization and because they were constructed of hardened adobe, weaker than the limestone used to build in the Maya Lowlands.

Over the past 100 years, more than fifty archaeological projects, large and small, have been mounted at Kaminaljuyu. In addition to excavations, scholars such as Alfred Maudslay and Samuel K. Lothrop have recorded sculptures and made maps of the site. In 1925 Manuel Gamio undertook limited excavations, finding deep cultural deposits yielding potsherds and clay figurines from what later was called the "Middle Cultures" of Mesoamerica (from 1500 BC to 150 AD). A decade later, the importance of the site was confirmed when a local football club began cutting away the edges of two inconspicuous mounds to lengthen their practice field, discovering an impressive buried structure. Lic. J. Antonio Villacorta C., the Minister of Public Education in Guatemala City, requested archaeologists Alfred Kidder, Jesse Jennings and Edwin Shook to investigate. Villacorta gave the site its name from a Kʼicheʼ word meaning "mounds of the ancestors."

When first mapped scientifically by E. M. Shook over a period of decades from the 1930s on, at least half of which were from before the end of the Preclassic period (250 AD). Kidder, Jennings, and Shook's monograph, published by the Carnegie Institution of Washington – one of the most important archaeological research entities in the history of Maya scholarship – brought excited attention by scholars to the significance of the SMA. This excitement turned to consensus about the priority of high social and cultural developments in the South when Shook and Kidder published their report on Mound E-III-3, a "Miraflores" mound and the largest known thus far from the site, and which contained seven structures built onion-skin fashion over and around each other through time. Two extraordinarily rich royal tombs were found within the edifices, probably representing consecutive rulers during the "Miraflores" Preclassic apogee of Kaminaljuyu.

In the early 1950s Heinrich Berlin excavated a large mound in the ancient Preclassic core of the city. In the 1960s Pennsylvania State University undertook extensive excavations at Kaminaljuyu, under the direction of William T. Sanders and Joseph W. Michels. The processualist and unilineal cultural evolutionary theoretical orientation of the Penn State project were in sharp contrast to the Carnegie work before and to the historical, cultural-historical, sometimes epigraphy- and art-historically driven paradigm of Lowland Maya research after. In the 1990s, Marion Popenoe de Hatch and Juan Antonio Valdés conducted excavations in the southern districts of the site, and a Japanese team investigated a large mound near the modern archaeological park.

Emphases since the 1970s on Classic Maya hieroglyphic texts and discoveries of great sites in the northern Petén turned attention away from the SMA, and a long period ensued during which proponents of a Maya Lowlands origins for Maya civilization held sway. More recently, the debate was rejoined with discoveries along the southern Pacific coast of Mexico and in Guatemala that greatly antedate developments in the Lowlands.

== Occupation history ==
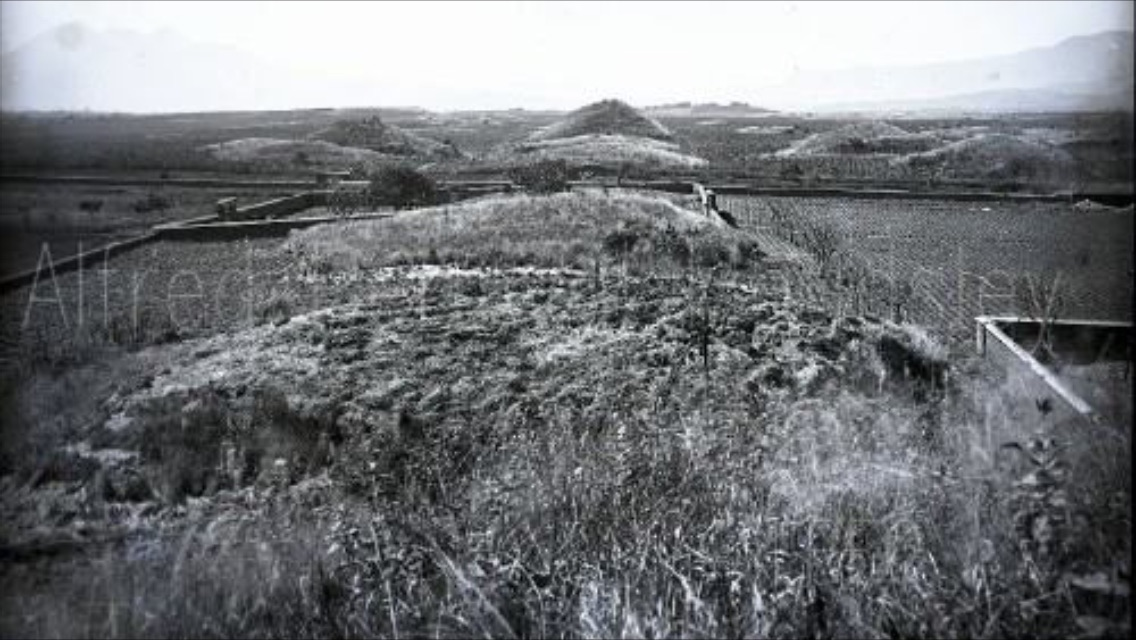
Archeological site in 1890. Photograph by Alfred Percival Maudslay.

The known parts of Kaminaljuyu lie on a broad plain beneath roughly the western third of modern Guatemala City. Soils are rich because of frequent volcanic eruptions; volcanic ash in the form of hardened tuff reaches depths of several hundred meters in and around Kaminaljuyu, and deep clefts or barrancos mark the landscape.

There are many mysteries, in addition to size and scale, that likely will remain unanswered about Kaminaljuyu. These questions are mainly about the role of the city as the greatest of the Southern Maya area (SMA) in Preclassic times, particularly during the Miraflores period, c. 400–100 BC. The SMA is long believed to have been seminal in the development of Maya civilization.

=== Arévalo and Las Charcas cultures ===
Kidder, Jennings, and Shook referred to Kaminaljuyu's artifacts as representative of what they called a "Middle Culture" which they believed represented the earliest phase of complex social and cultural development in Mesoamerica. This reflected their conclusion about the great antiquity of developments at Kaminaljuyu and their belief that Kaminaljuyu was primordial for its cultural and social innovations. Since their work, investigations chiefly undertaken by scholars from the New World Archaeological Foundation on the southern Pacific coast of Mexico have greatly altered this view, deepening in time the incipience of complex social and cultural events in Mesoamerica. Cultures of this phase had a stable agricultural community organized probably as a simple chiefdom.

Over many years Shook and Kidder developed the Kaminaljuyu ceramic sequence, and it remains, with refinements by Shook and Marion Popenoe de Hatch, one of the most secure and reliable ceramic chronologies in Mesoamerica, although some doubts remain about the absolute dates due to a paucity of radiocarbon anchors (a revision by Inomata, et al. to the following chronology, based on Bayesian analysis, would push forward the ceramic phases by as much as 300 years, setting the Miraflores apogee to a 100 BC – AD 100 time frame). With Inomata, et al's revision in mind, the first significant settlement dates to the Arévalo phase, c. 900–800 BC, with indications of dense populations no later than c. 400 BC. By the end of the Las Charcas culture (800–350 BC), Kaminaljuyu was developing "religious and civic institutions." Scattered Las Charcas remains throughout the Valley of Guatemala mark a major occupation of the area at sites such as El Naranjo; at this latter site, as well as at El Portón some 50 kilometers to the north and Takalik Abaj, about 130 kilometers to the west in the lower piedmont, plain uncarved upright shaft stones called stelae, mark the first appearance of a cult of time-reckoning and which became one of the bases for the institution of Maya kingship. The architecture of Middle Preclassic structures consisted of hardened adobe bricks that served, later, as foundations for raised platforms and pyramidal temples.

Excavations indicate that from early in the Middle Preclassic the community was large enough to produce heavy refuse deposits. Cotton was grown as well as maize; palaeobotanical research also has identified annonas, avocados, cacao, black beans, palm nuts, plums, and sapodilla (zapote blanco). Arboriculture developed – with groves of crop trees grown in terraces down to the edges of great ravines. Specialists practiced loom-weaving and were expert potters. Large-scale workshops for obsidian tool-making were spread around the ancient city. Religious practices that would later be further developed throughout Mesoamerica were elaborating during the early Middle Preclassic at Kaminaljuyu, including the erection of mounds to serve as substructures for small shrines or funerary/administrative temples, the development of a complex pantheon of deities – probably based on some primordial mythology and cosmology of which the Popol Vuh represents a fragment – and euhemerism, an incensario and stela cult, and warfare to procure captives for royal sacrifice.

Many of the artifacts from Las Charcas not associated with burials were found in pits. There were principally two types of pits: shallow bowl-like pits and bottle-shaped pits. The shallow pits were possibly used for digging clay to be used in building and later to hold refuse. Carbonized avocado seeds, maize cobs and remnants of textiles, basketry, mats and rope fragments have been found in those that are bottle-shaped. It is thought these pits were used for cooking, storage and refuse containers.

Hand-modeled clay female figurines are also highly characteristic of Las Charcas culture. Those found at Kaminaljuyu are generally of reddish-brown clay and some have a white slip. The female figurines often depict pregnancy and are thought to have been offerings to promote fertility in the fields. Usually, the arms and legs of the figures are mere stumps but some attempt at a realistic body shape has been made. The head has received the most attention to detail. The nose was pinched into the relief and nostrils were made by punctuating the clay. The eyes and the mouth were formed by strategically applied lumps. The figurines often have earplug flares.

=== The "Miraflores" ===
The apogee of Preclassic developments at Kaminaljuyu occurred during what scholars refer to as the "Miraflores" period – once a name for a Late Preclassic ceramic phase, now split into two, the Verbena and Arenal. Preclassic remains, particularly from this epoch, are extremely abundant at Kaminaljuyu; Shook and Kidder noted that in Mound E-III-3 "...an average of...200 sherds per cubic meter [were found...the mound] in its final stage [having] a volume of some 75,000 cu. m [yielding] the astounding total of approximately 15,000,000 fragments...[A]llowing 30 sherds to represent one vessel – a high average considering the abundance of small pre-Classic bowls...at least 500,000 complete vessels had been used, broken, and their fragments incidentally incorporated in the fill of this one mound." What Kidder, Jennings, and Shook referred to as the Middle Cultures are now understood as the Middle Preclassic period, which lasted from 1000 to 400 BC, and the Late Preclassic period, dating from 400 BC to 250 AD.

In its "Miraflores" heyday, enormously eclectic sculptures were placed around the city, in plazas, and in front of platforms and temples. Brightly colored murals and giant masks adorned the sides of edifices. Monuments included effigies of toads, bats, owls, jaguars, and serpents; particularly important was the Principal Bird Deity, a symbol of celestial power often invoked in the iconography of kingship. Early versions of other Classic Maya deities were depicted, including the maize god, the Hero Twins, and a merchant god. The sculptural eclecticism is another indication of the Preclassic cosmopolitan and "international" character of Kaminaljuyu, the role of "port-of-trade" or "gateway" capital continuing through Classic times despite a major change of cultural traditions and, possibly, ethnic affiliation at the end of the Preclassic.

==== Sacred Kingship ====
Enormous thrones and stelae attest to the might and splendor of "Miraflores" Kaminaljuyu. Stela 10, a fragment of a gigantic throne, is carved with a decapitation narrative scene showing a ruler masked and attired to impersonate an underworld jaguar deity wielding a flint axe over what likely was a kneeling captive; the head of a jaguar deity floats to the right of the ruler/protagonist, invoked by the burning of blood in a sacrificial plate. The similarly gigantic Monument 65 is carved, on the front, with three seated, throned rulers, each one framed by two bound, kneeling, nude captives, each ruler and his paired victims vertically positioned within a lower, a central, and an upper register. Almost annually, fragments of once very large sculptural monuments are found in Guatemala City often during unregulated municipal demolition and construction. Many monuments were carved with Preclassic hieroglyphic texts (Kaplan 2011), underscoring the fact that, as Coe observes, "the elite of [Kaminaljuyu] were fully literate at a time when other Maya were perhaps just learning that writing existed."

==== Hydraulics ====
In the last twenty years, archaeologists have studied sophisticated water control systems in the southern precincts of "Miraflores" Kaminaljuyu, indicating an extensive bureaucracy and concomitant social hierarchy must have been in place to supervise and maintain the hydraulics. These systems date to the "Miraflores" and endured through to the end of the Preclassic.

=== Esperanza cultures and a Teotihuacán Intrusion? ===
Two major mounds excavated by Kidder, Jennings, and Shook contained tombs probably representing rulers from the Esperanza period.

In Mound A the tomb is associated with a pit burial. All that remains in the pit burial of its original fill are worn igneous rocks, quantities of coarse sherds and human skull parts that had been cut through by the digging of the tomb. The tomb contains the remains of eight people. One corpse received special treatment, as evinced by the considerable amount of jewelry and the offerings left with it. The bodies were borne into the tomb on fabric mats or animal hides of which only traces remain. Among the objects found as offerings in the tomb were jade beads around the necks of two of the corpses, wafer-like disc shells forming a choker on one skeleton, jade earplug flares, an unusually large number of shells, a fine obsidian blade, a tortoise shell, metates, and various fine pottery pieces including a whistling jar and a carved tripod vessel. Several coarse brown ware vessels heaped against the wall of the tomb probably originally contained food prepared for the after-life journey of the dead.

The Esperanza tombs of Mounds A and B are notable because of the interment within them of elite-use ceramic vessels in unmistakable Teotihuacán style. Teotihuacán was the greatest ancient city in Mesoamerica, with far-flung hegemonic reach from its location in Central Mexico. During the Early Classic period in the Maya world, art and artifacts, as well as hieroglyphics, attest to specific intrusions by and influences from Teotihuacán at great Lowland cities such as Tikal, Piedras Negras, and Copán, although the exact nature of this presence remains controversial. Teotihuacán, like the later Aztec empire, was drawn to the Southern area undoubtedly because of its rich resources of obsidian and cacao.

Dating to Esperanza times and later in the Classic period, twelve ballcourts have been found, possibly indicating an emphasis on the resolution of conflicts through ritual game-playing rather than war, which would underscore Kaminaljuyu's role as a nexus and intermediary between powerful foreign entities and as a religious "pilgrimage" site.

== Economics ==
Enormous obsidian beds lying 20 km northeast of Guatemala City and known as El Chayal (Kakchikel Maya for "obsidian") are long presumed to have been the most important material basis for Kaminaljuyu's ascendance as the greatest polity in the SMA as well as its continuation as the preeminent city in the Southern Maya Area during the Classic period. Distinctively black in color, obsidian from the Chayal beds found at sites throughout the Lowlands as well as the Southern Maya Area supports this assumption, although the specifics of control, whether formally under Kaminaljuyu's hegemony or more informally representing a vital material resource whose wealth accrued to the city more or less in direct relation to proximity, remain in the realm of speculation.

In addition to Chayal obsidian, the strategic location of Kaminaljuyu as a nexus for trade between the Pacific coast and piedmont and the Maya Lowlands – salt, fish, and shells from the coast, cacao and other agricultural products from the piedmont, jaguar skins, feathers, and other commodities from the Lowland jungles – underlay Kaminaljuyu's wealth and influence throughout the Maya world. Excavations have since revealed the earliest Pacific marine fish remains yet found at any Maya highland site in a Late Preclassic dedicatory deposit, likely transported dried and salted from the Pacific coast as part of this same trade network. Kaminaljuyu's strategic location also facilitated interactions with central Mexican centers, including Teotihuacan, extending Kaminaljuyu's regional and transregional connections and influence.

== See also ==
- Chocola
- Museo Miraflores
- Michael Coe
