= Suchitepéquez Department =

Department of Guatemala

Coordinates: 14.534°N 91.503°W

Suchitepéquez Department Departmento de Suchitepéquez
- Department of Guatemala
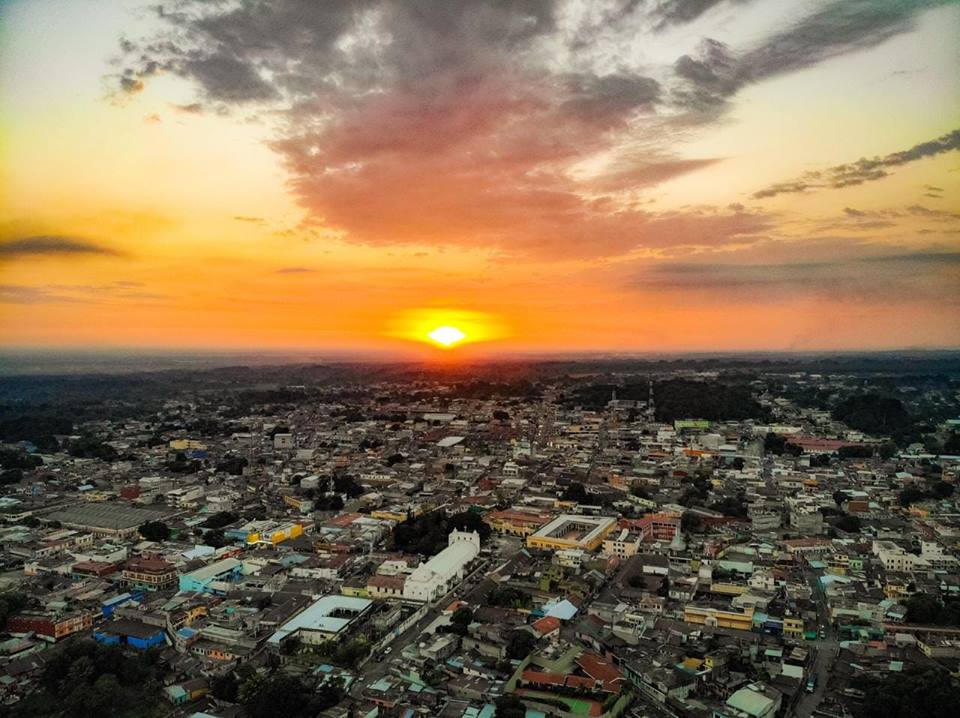
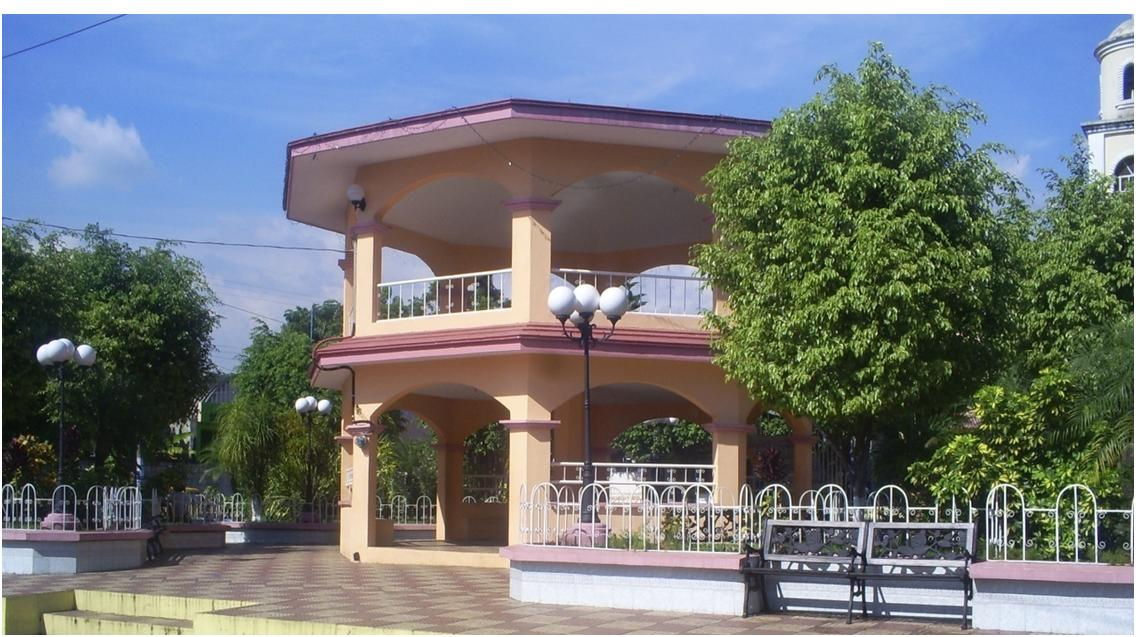
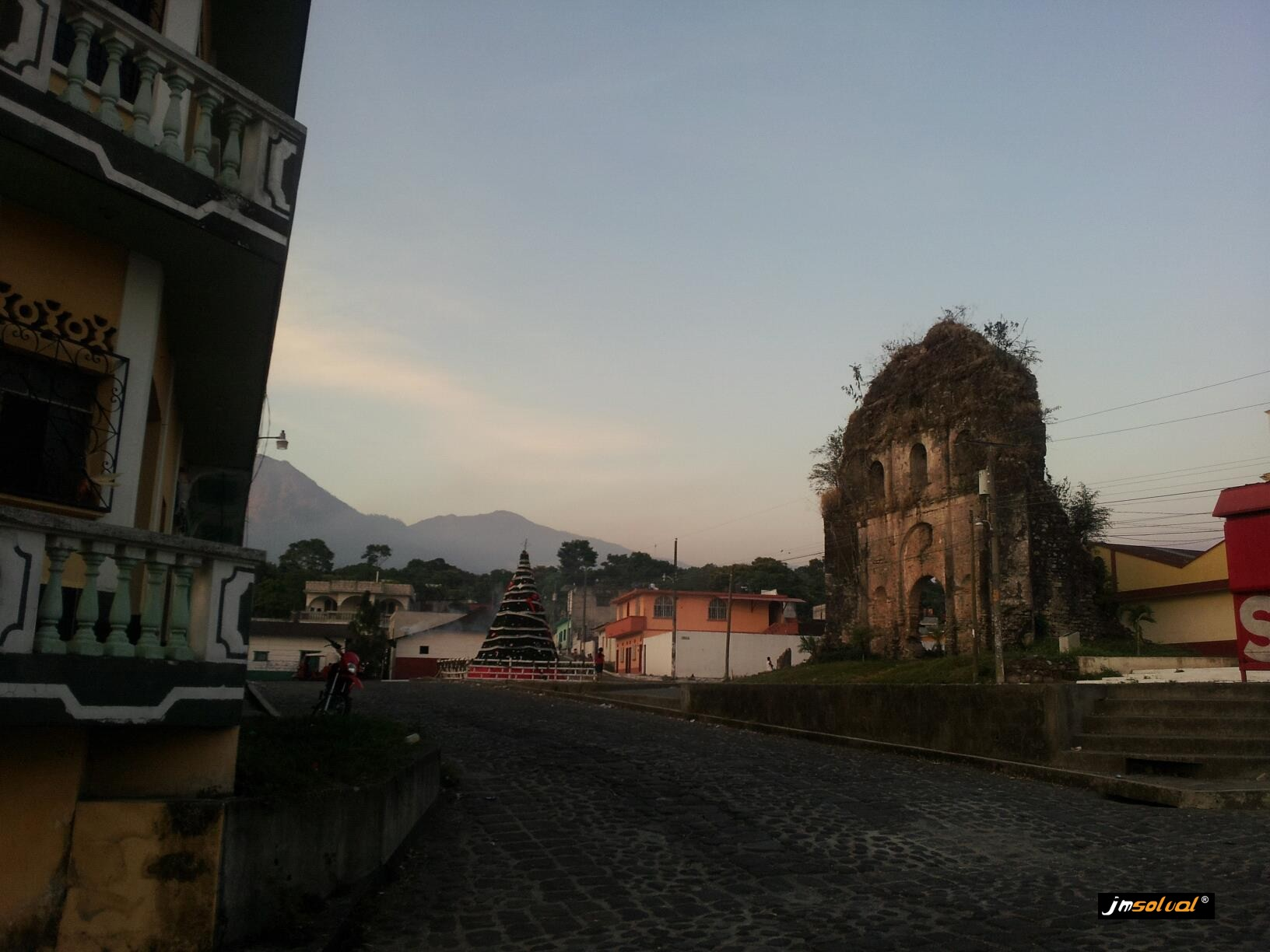
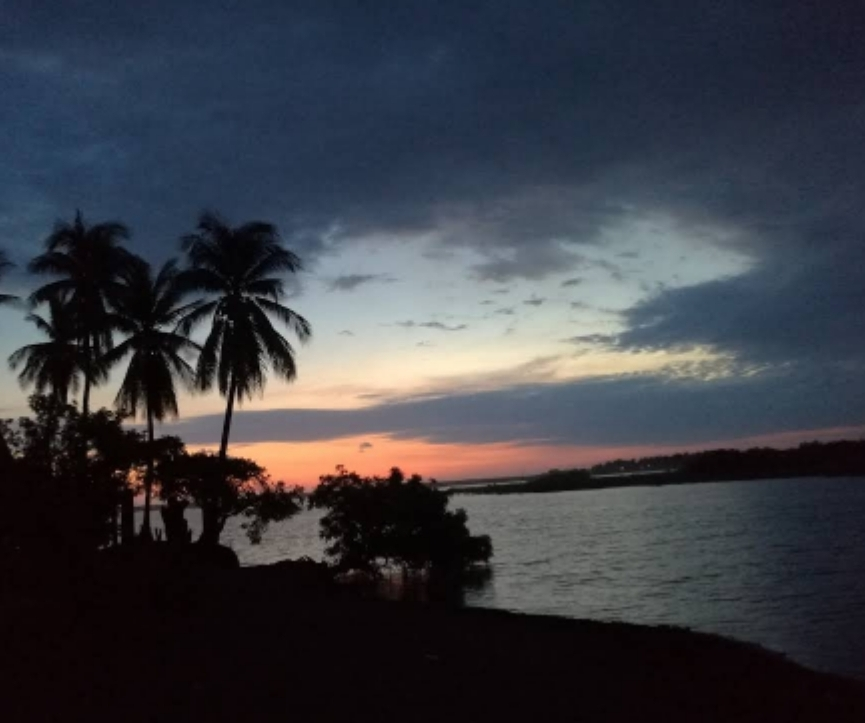
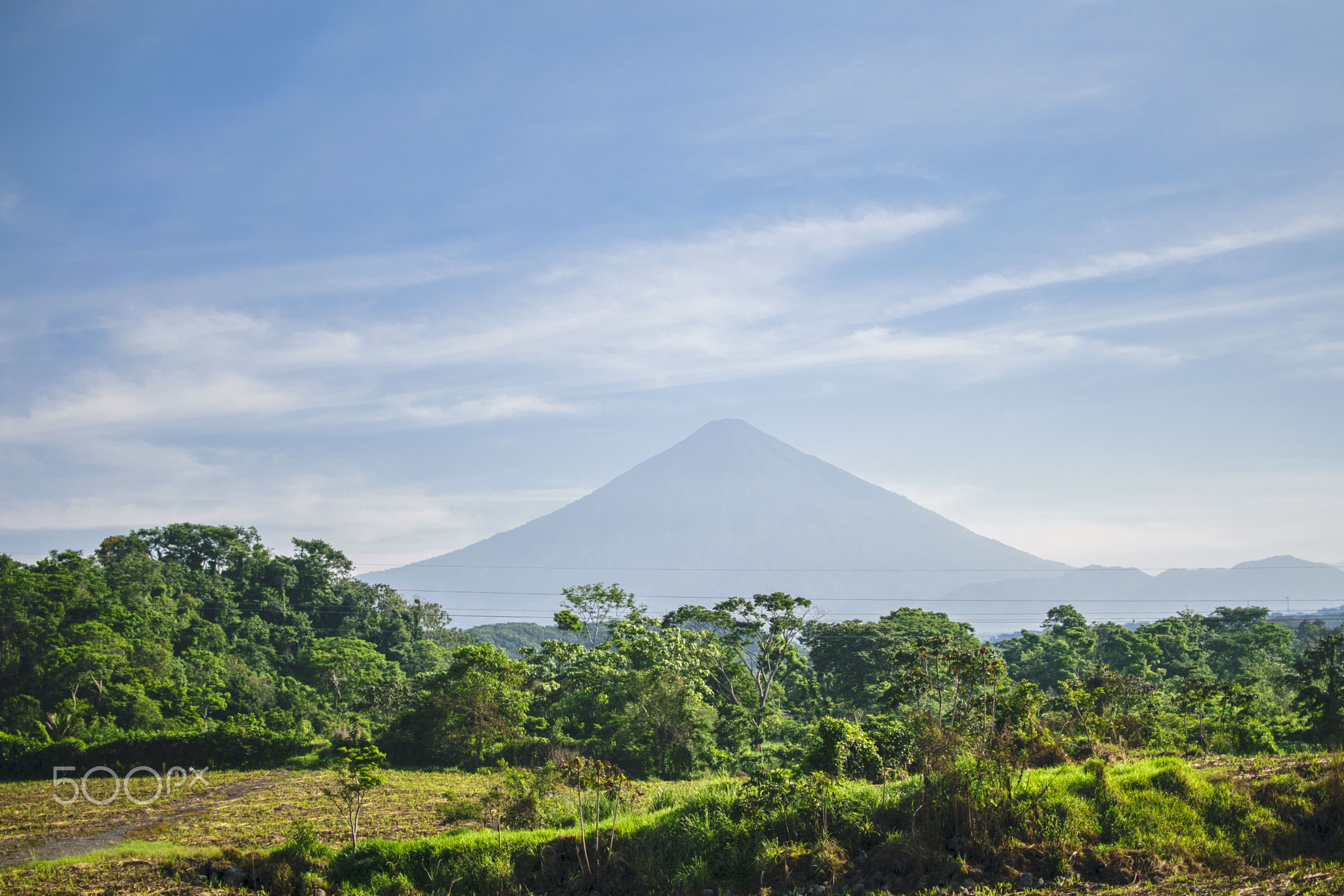
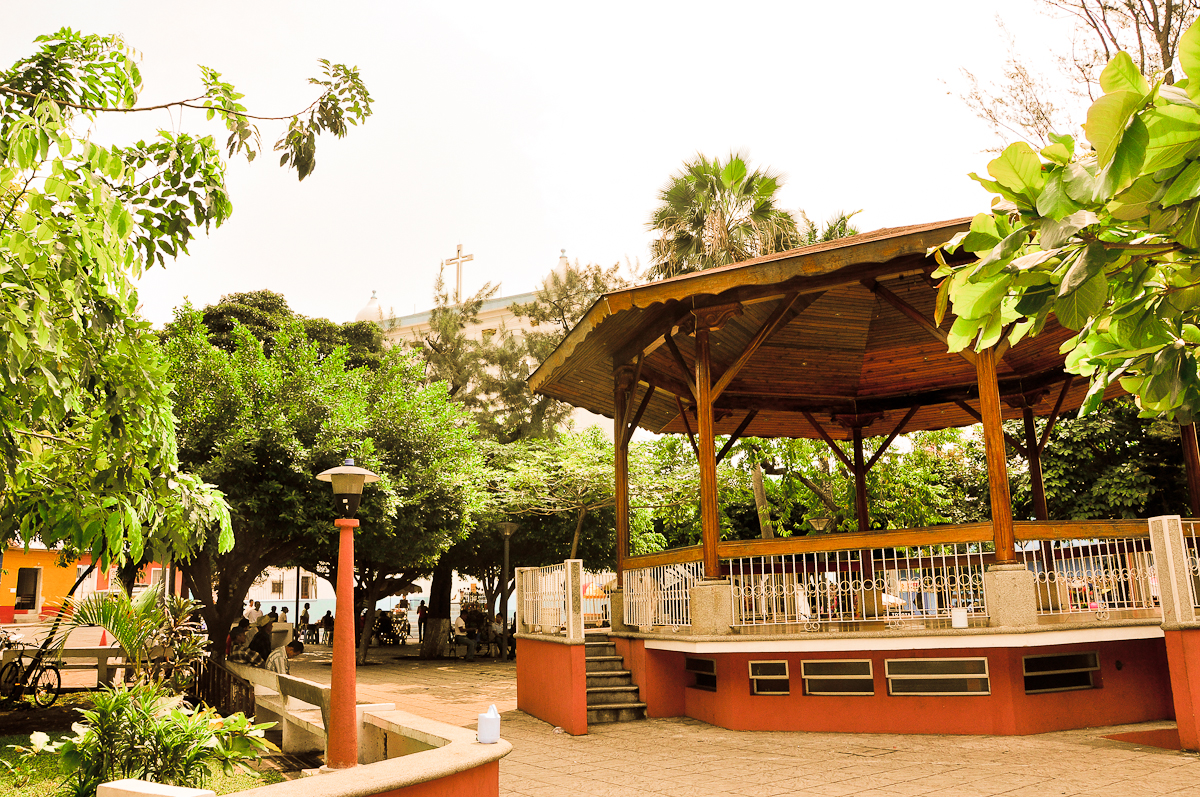
- Mazatenango City Park San Miguel Panán San Pablo Jocopilas Tahuexco Beach Water Volcano Mazatenango Park

- Flag Coat of arms

- Suchitepéquez
- Country: Guatemala
- Capital: Mazatenango
- Municipalities: 20

Government
  - Type: Departmental

Area
  - Department of Guatemala: 2,510 km^{2} (970 sq mi)

Population (2018)
  - Department of Guatemala: 554,695
  - Density: 221/km^{2} (572/sq mi)
  - Urban: 266,189
  - Religions: Roman Catholicism Evangelicalism Christian religion
- Time zone: UTC-6

Suchitepéquez (Spanish pronunciation: [sutʃiteˈpekes]) is one of the 22 departments of Guatemala. Its capital is Mazatenango. It is situated in the southwestern region of Guatemala, bordering Quetzaltenango, Sololá, and Chimaltenango to the north, the Pacific Ocean to the south, Escuintla to the east, and Retalhuleu to the west.

== Municipalities ==
- Chicacao
- Cuyotenango
- Mazatenango
- Patulul
- Pueblo Nuevo
- Río Bravo
- Samayac
- San Antonio Suchitepéquez
- San Bernardino
- San Francisco Zapotitlán
- San Gabriel
- San José El Idolo
- San Juan Bautista
- San Lorenzo, Suchitepéquez
- San Miguel Panán
- San Pablo Jocopilas
- Santa Bárbara
- Santo Domingo Suchitepequez
- Santo Tomás La Unión
- Zunilito
