= List of lakes of Guatemala =

This is a list of lakes in Guatemala.

== Lakes ==
Name	Area (km^{2})	Max. depth (m)	Coordinates	Altitude (m)	Department	Municipality
Laguna de Ayarza	14	230	14°25′N 90°7′W	1409	Santa Rosa	Casillas
Laguna de Calderas	0.11	20	14°24′40″N 90°35′25″W	1778	Guatemala	San Vicente Pacaya
Lago Atitlán	130	340	14°42′N 91°12′W	1562	Sololá	Santiago Atitlán
Lago de Guija	45	430	14°15′N 89°32′W	430	Jutiapa, Santa Ana	Asunción Mita
Laguna de Chicabal	0.22	331	14°47′N 91°40′W	2712	Quetzaltenango	San Martín Sacatepéquez
Laguna Nisguaya	0.56	2	13°54′30″N 90°11′50″W	35	Jutiapa	Pasaco
Laguneta El Tule	0.30	2	13°51′10″N 90°7′50″W	89	Jutiapa	Moyuta
Laguna de Ipala	0.59	25	14°33′20″N 89°38′20″W	1493	Chiquimula	Ipala
Laguna El Pino	0.72	18	14°20′40″N 90°23′38″W	1022	Santa Rosa	Barberena
Laguna de Ixpaco			14°15′00″N 90°25′00″W	750	Santa Rosa	Barberena
Lago de Amatitlán	15.20	33	14°28′N 90°36′W	1188	Guatemala	Amatitlán
Lago de Izabal	589.6	18	15°24′2″N 89°10′0″W	2	Izabal	El Estor
Laguneta Bujajal	8.24		15°26′15″N 89°22′30″W	2	Izabal	El Estor
Laguneta el Amatillo	1.40	5	15°46′50″N 89°21′40″W	11	Izabal	El Estor
Laguna el Temblor	0.35		15°24′10″N 89°36′20″W	9	Alta Verapaz	Panzós
Laguna Lachuá	4	222	15°55′N 90°40′W	173	Alta Verapaz	Cobán
Laguna Yolnabaj	3.80	35	16°03′00″N 91°34′00″W	1142	Huehuetenango	Nentón
Laguneta Mirabel	0.125	18	15°59′55″N 91°34′42″W	1520	Huehuetenango	Nentón
Pozas Azules			16°56′37″N 90°48′00″W	140	El Petén	La Libertad
Laguna la Gloria	0.23		16°57′00″N 90°29′50″W	160	El Petén	La Libertad
Laguneta el Repasto			17°12′30″N 91°01′00″W	120	El Petén	La Libertad
Laguneta las Cuaches			16°35′50″N 90°21′40″W	130	El Petén	La Libertad
Laguneta Lacandón			17°04′00″N 91°10′20″W	100	El Petén	La Libertad
Laguna Comixtún			16°33′40″N 90°10′50″W	120	El Petén	Sayaxché
Laguneta La Gardunza			16°53′30″N 91°10′00″W	100	El Petén	Sayaxché
Laguna Petexbatún	5.40		16.432381°N 90.187283°E	130	El Petén	Sayaxché
Laguneta la Pita			17°10′00″N 90°56′30″W	140	El Petén	La Libertad
Laguneta Balamchac			16°51′20″N 90°46′00″W	140	El Petén	La Libertad
Laguna San Juan Acul	1.75		16°33′00″N 90°18′00″W	130	El Petén	Sayaxché
Laguna Las Pozas	2		16°20′50″N 90°10′00″W	150	El Petén	Sayaxché
Laguna Yaxtunilá			16°34′05″N 90°16′35″W	110	El Petén	Sayaxché
Laguna Aguateca			16°23′40″N 90°12′00″W	110	El Petén	Sayaxché
Laguna Chiquiguau			16°33′35″N 90°06′05″W	120	El Petén	Sayaxché
Laguneta Yalcachimba			16°32′40″N 90°12′40″W	120	El Petén	Sayaxché
Laguneta Ceibal			16°32′00″N 90°02′40″W	120	El Petén	Sayaxché
Laguneta la Sombra				125	El Petén	Sayaxché
Laguneta Mangal	0.3		16°33′00″N 90°15′25″W	130	El Petén	Sayaxché
Laguneta Santa María			16°53′00″N 90°56′30″W	100	El Petén	Sayaxché
Laguneta Ixcoche			16°29′20″N 90°34′20″W	110	El Petén	Sayaxché
Laguneta García			16°22′00″N 90°03′55″W	140	El Petén	Sayaxché
Laguneta el Chorro			16°29′40″N 90°02′55″W	120	El Petén	Sayaxché
Laguneta Champoxte	1.02		17°03′40″N 89°29′00″W	200	El Petén	Flores
Laguna Sacnab	5.30		17°03′40″N 89°22′00″W	180	El Petén	Flores
Laguneta Iberia			16°25′45″N 90°01′20″W	120	El Petén	Sayaxché
Laguna Mendoza			16°36′50″N 90°29′25″W	130	El Petén	La Libertad
Laguneta Texcoco			17°08′00″N 91°10′30″W	110	El Petén	La Libertad
Laguna San Diego	3.70		16°59′00″N 90°37′00″W	160	El Petén	La Libertad
Aguada Seca			16°38′12″N 90°31′00″W	118	El Petén	La Libertad
Laguna Maxbal	0.80	20	15°58′30″N 91°10′10″W	1220	Huehuetenango	Barillas
Laguneta Poclac			15°53′57″N 91°20′30″W		Huehuetenango	Barillas
Laguneta Yolhuitz			15°59′32″N 91°16′35″W		Huehuetenango	Barillas
Laguneta el Sos			16°57′20″N 90°07′40″W	180	El Petén	La Libertad
Laguna Petenchel	6.25		16°56′00″N 89°50′00″W	110	El Petén	Flores
Laguna Yalmoján	0.30		16°54′25″N 90°26′28″W	133	El Petén	Flores
Laguneta Salpetén	3.01	36	16°59′00″N 89°40′00″W	200	El Petén	Flores
Laguneta Macanché	2.30	60	16°50′20″N 89°37′40″W	175	El Petén	Flores
Laguna Oquevix	2.75		16°39′00″N 89°45′00″W	160	El Petén	Flores
Laguna Ucanal			16°39′00″N 89°54′25″W	160	El Petén	Flores
Laguna Zapotal			16°39′00″N 89°55′40″W	160	El Petén	Flores
Laguna Carnalote			16°59′00″N 90°01′30″W	140	El Petén	Flores
Laguna Sacpuy	3.45	4	16°55′20″N 89°46′30″W	140	El Petén	Flores
Laguna Quexil	2.22	35	16°55′20″N 89°46′30″W	125	El Petén	Flores
Laguna la Blanca			16°39′00″N 89°54′26″W	160	El Petén	Flores
Laguneta Ijá			16°57′10″N 90°10′20″W	140	El Petén	Flores
Laguneta Picú			16°57′10″N 90°10′20″W	140	El Petén	Flores
Lago Petén Itzá	99	160	16°54′00″N 89°41′41″W	110	El Petén	
Laguna la Colorada					El Petén	Flores
Laguna Yaxhá	15	27	17°04′N 89°24′W	158	El Petén	
Embalse Chixoy	140		15°16′53″N 90°29′27″W		Baja Verapaz, El Quiché	
El Golfete (Golfete Dulce)	62		15.7281°N 88.8807°W	0	Izabal	
Laguna de San Antonio			15.052404°N 91.228820°W		El Quiché	San Antonio Ilotenango
Laguna de Lemoa	0.225	2	15.052404°N 91.228820°W	1935	El Quiché	Santa Cruz del Quiché
Laguna Chichoj	0.51	25	15°24′45″N 90°28′44″W	1370	Alta Verapaz	San Cristóbal Verapaz
Laguna Chujá					Alta Verapaz	Cobán
Laguna Chajbalbuch					Alta Verapaz	Cobán
Laguna Sepalau	0.35		15°33′13″N 90°00′42″W	482	Alta Verapaz	Lanquín
Laguna Chiquixchoy					Chimaltenango	Tecpán Guatemala
Laguna Chichoy					Chimaltenango	Tecpán Guatemala
Laguna La Granadilla					Chiquimula	Esquipulas
Laguna Verde					Chiquimula	Esquipulas
Laguna La Granja					Chiquimula	Ipala
Laguna Tuticopote					Chiquimula	Olopa
Laguna Cayur					Chiquimula	Olopa
Laguna Panjul					El Petén	Flores
Laguna Pujo					El Petén	Flores
Laguna Quexil					El Petén	Flores
Laguna Repasto					El Petén	La Libertad
Laguna Gloria					El Petén	La Libertad
Laguna Itzán					El Petén	La Libertad
Laguna San Joaquín					El Petén	La Libertad
Laguna Larga					El Petén	La Libertad
Laguna Los Patos					El Petén	La Libertad
Laguna Santa María					El Petén	La Libertad
Laguna Perdida	10.70		17°04′00″N 90°13′00″W	80	El Petén	La Libertad
Laguna El Sos					El Petén	La Libertad
Laguna Curro					El Petén	La Libertad
Laguna El Tigre					El Petén	San Andrés
Laguna Chuntuquí					El Petén	San Andrés
Laguna Santa Rita					El Petén	San Andrés
Laguna Santa Cruz					El Petén	San Andrés
Laguna Guacamayo					El Petén	San Andrés
Laguna Picú					El Petén	San Andrés
Laguna Canjá					El Petén	San Andrés
Laguna Palmar					El Petén	San Andrés
Laguna Ucabal					El Petén	San Francisco
Laguna Sacpetén					El Petén	San José
Laguna La Guayabita					El Petén	Santa Ana
Laguna Oquevix	2.75		16°39′00″N 89°45′00″W	160	El Petén	Santa Ana
Laguna Comixtún					El Petén	Sayaxché
Laguna Sombra					El Petén	Sayaxché
Laguna Cerritos					El Quiché	Chiché
Laguna Chiaj					El Quiché	San Antonio Ilotenango
Laguna Estancia					El Quiché	Santa Cruz del Quiché
Laguna Potrero					El Quiché	Santa Cruz del Quiché
Laguna Sacpec					El Quiché	Uspantán
La Laguna					El Quiché	Uspantán
Laguna Cuaches					Escuintla	Guanagazapa
Laguna Chilin					Escuintla	Guanagazapa
Laguna de los Patos					Escuintla	San José
Laguna Quitasombrero					Escuintla	San José
Laguna Amaya					Escuintla	San José
Laguna Naranjo					Guatemala	Guatemala
Laguna de la Danta o Laguna Yatzimín					Huehuetenango	Barillas
Laguna Chancel					Huehuetenango	Chiantla
Laguna Ocubilá	0.20	18	16°20′26″N 91°25′46″W	1985	Huehuetenango	Chiantla
Siete Lagunas					Huehuetenango	Chiantla
Laguna Magdalena					Huehuetenango	Chiantla
Laguna Trinidad					Huehuetenango	Nentón
Laguna Palmas					Huehuetenango	Nentón
Laguna Leche					Huehuetenango	Nentón
Laguna Reparosuc					Huehuetenango	Nentón
Laguna Magdalena					Huehuetenango	San Juan Ixcoy
Laguna Cruz Quemada					Huehuetenango	Santa Bárbara
Laguna Salvador					Izabal	Livingston
Laguna Grande					Izabal	Livingston
Laguna Cálix					Izabal	Livingston
Laguna Escondida					Izabal	Livingston
Laguna Cuatro Cayos					Izabal	Livingston
Laguna Tinta					Izabal	Puerto Barrios
Laguna Santa Isabel					Izabal	Puerto Barrios
Laguna Izotes					Jalapa	Jalapa
Laguna Carrillo					Jalapa	Jalapa
Laguna Hoyo	0.15	40	14°27′50″N 89°53′26″W	995	Jalapa	Monjas
Laguna Obrajuelo					Jutiapa	Agua Blanca
Laguna Atescatempa					Jutiapa	Atescatempa
Laguna Briotis					Jutiapa	Conguaco
Laguna Retana	1.93*		14°20′00″N 89°51′10″W	1040	Jutiapa	El Progreso, Santa Catarina Mita
Laguna Muchacho					Jutiapa	Moyuta
Laguna Grande					Jutiapa	Moyuta
Laguna Tule					Jutiapa	Moyuta
Laguna San José					Jutiapa	Moyuta, Pasaco
Laguna Encantada					Jutiapa	Moyuta, Pasaco
Laguna Hojas					Jutiapa	Moyuta, Pasaco
Laguna San Juan					Jutiapa	Moyuta, Pasaco
Laguna Comendador	0.875	11	13°57′37″N 90°15′0″W	25	Jutiapa	Moyuta, Pasaco
Laguna San Pedro					Jutiapa	Santa Catarina Mita
Laguna Verde					El Progreso	San Antonio La Paz
Laguna Escondida					Retalhuleu	Champerico
Laguna Negro					Retalhuleu	Champerico
Laguna Negrito					Retalhuleu	Champerico
Laguna Madura					Retalhuleu	Champerico
Laguna Pargos					Retalhuleu	Champerico
Laguna Grande					Retalhuleu	Champerico
Laguna Chachitas					Retalhuleu	Champerico
Laguna Aguacaña					Retalhuleu	Champerico
Laguna Raicitas					Retalhuleu	Champerico
Laguna Penas					Retalhuleu	Champerico
Laguna Corchal					Retalhuleu	Champerico
Laguna Espínola					Retalhuleu	Champerico
Laguna Sábalos					Retalhuleu	Champerico
Laguna Acopoloncillo					Retalhuleu	Champerico
Laguna Balonas					Retalhuleu	Champerico
Laguna Chaguitón					Retalhuleu	Retalhuleu
Laguna Guayabal					Retalhuleu	Retalhuleu
Laguna Húmedo					Retalhuleu	Retalhuleu
Laguna Ixpatz					Retalhuleu	Retalhuleu
Laguna Cataluña					Retalhuleu	Retalhuleu
Laguna Poza del Salto					Retalhuleu	Retalhuleu
Laguna Castaño	0.55	20	14°16′30″N 91°45′00″W	38	Retalhuleu	Retalhuleu
Laguna Madre Viejecita					Retalhuleu	San Andrés Villa Seca
Laguna Papaturro					Retalhuleu	San Andrés Villa Seca
Laguna El Tendedero					Retalhuleu	San Andrés Villa Seca
Laguna Dulce					Retalhuleu	San Andrés Villa Seca
Laguna Cimarrón					Retalhuleu	San Andrés Villa Seca
Laguna Madre Vieja					Retalhuleu	San Andrés Villa Seca
Laguna Madre Sal					Retalhuleu	San Andrés Villa Seca
Laguna Barajo					Retalhuleu	San Andrés Villa Seca
Laguna Seca					Retalhuleu	San Andrés Villa Seca
Laguna Negro					Retalhuleu	San Andrés Villa Seca
Laguna Tormento					Retalhuleu	San Andrés Villa Seca
Laguna Pampa Quemada					Retalhuleu	San Andrés Villa Seca
Laguna Palo Gordo					Retalhuleu	San Andrés Villa Seca
Laguna Guiscoyol	3.10	15	14°14′6″N 91°43′28″W	15	Retalhuleu	San Andrés Villa Seca
Laguna El Tigre					Retalhuleu	Santa Cruz Muluá
Laguna Mesa					Retalhuleu	Santa Cruz Muluá
Laguna Oc					Retalhuleu	Santa Cruz Muluá
Las Lagunas					San Marcos	San Marcos
Laguna Alcantarilla					San Marcos	San Marcos
Laguna Aldea					San Marcos	San Marcos
Laguna Coatepeque					Santa Rosa	Chiquimulilla
Laguna Ixpaco					Santa Rosa	Pueblo Nuevo Viñas
Laguna Junquillo					Santa Rosa	Santa Cruz Naranjo
Laguna Bosque					Santa Rosa	Santa Cruz Naranjo
Laguna Achiote					Suchitepéquez	Cuyotenango
Laguna Cruzadilla					Suchitepéquez	Cuyotenango
Laguna Seca					Suchitepéquez	Cuyotenango
Laguna Cedro					Suchitepéquez	Cuyotenango
Laguna Mulato					Suchitepéquez	Cuyotenango
Laguna Sipacate					Suchitepéquez	Mazatenango
Laguna Chiquistepeque					Suchitepéquez	Mazatenango
Laguna Cuitacuilco					Suchitepéquez	Santo Domingo Suchitepéquez
Laguna Guamuchal					Suchitepéquez	Santo Domingo Suchitepéquez
Laguna Muñoz					Suchitepéquez	Santo Domingo Suchitepéquez
Laguna Del Sauce					Suchitepéquez	Santo Domingo Suchitepéquez
Laguneta Achiotes					Jalapa	Jalapa
Laguneta Agua Dulce					Escuintla	La Gomera
Laguneta Aitón					Huehuetenango	Ixtahuacán
Laguneta América					Retalhuleu	Retalhuleu
