= Santa Cruz Muluá =

Coordinates: 14°35′N 91°37′W

Santa Cruz Muluá is a municipality in the Retalhuleu department of Guatemala. Its name comes from the ancient mayan word " Mulaja " which means " Land Between Rivers, " because its between the Samalá River, the Rio Muluá and many other small rivers and streams. It is situated 180 km from Guatemala City. The administrative center is bounded by the Samalá River to the west, which serves as the border with San Sebastián. Santa Cruz Muluá borders on the north with San Martín Zapotitlán, with theme parks Xetulul and Xocomil. Also to the north lies San Felipe famous for its blood sausage (moronga locally), to the east and the south is San Andrés Villa Seca. Santa Cruz Mulua municipality contains several villages: El Asintal (also Canton Asintal), Los Brillantes (also Finca Los Brilliantes), Boxoma further to the south and not often visited and, Lolita, which is the most distant and close the Pacific coast.
