= National Museum of Guatemalan Art =

Art museum in Guatemala

- Museo Nacional de Arte de Guatemala (MUNAG)
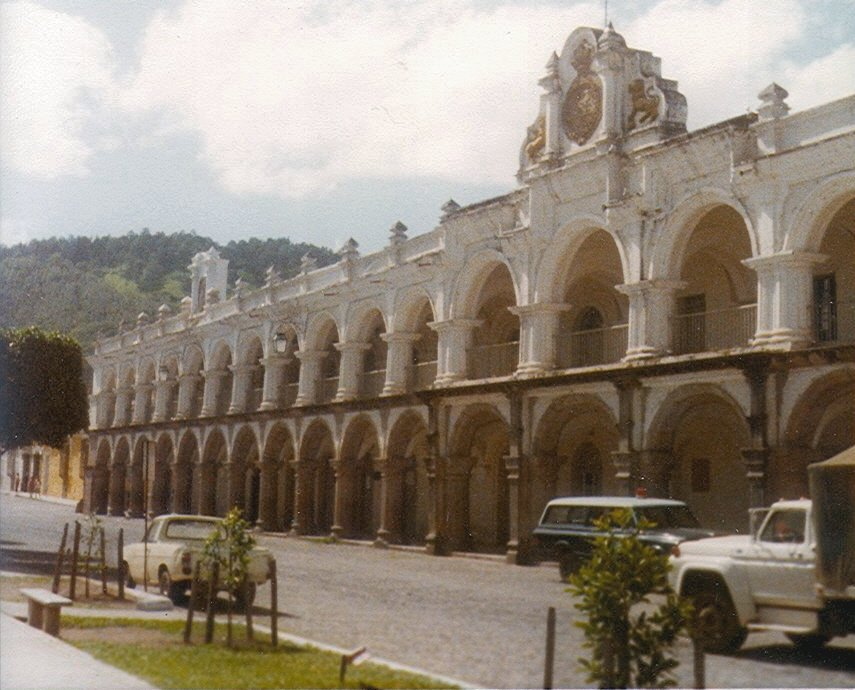
- Facade of the Palace of the Captains General, where the museum is housed, 1979

- Location within Guatemala
- Location: Antigua Guatemala
- Coordinates: 14.556155850576271°N 90.73342852087026°W
- Type: Art museum
- Website: culturaguate.com/munag/

The National Museum of Guatemalan Art (Spanish: Museo Nacional de Arte de Guatemala or MUNAG) is an art museum located in Antigua Guatemala, Sacatepéquez Department.

== Background ==
The museum is housed in the Palacio de los Capitanes Generales, which dates to the 16th century and was once the seat of the Captaincy General of Guatemala. The building is also a UNESCO-designated World Heritage Site. The first phase of the museum was inaugurated on September 10, 2021. Work on the second phase of the museum began on December 1, 2021. One year later, on August 1, 2022, the second phase of the museum was inaugurated, adding an additional 10 rooms to the exhibition space. The museum received more than 500 visitors on its first day of operation after completion of the second phase. The museum has seen more than 175,000 visitors since it first opened in September 2021.

The museum has received funding from the Central American Bank for Economic Integration but is mostly funded by the Ministry of Culture and Sports of Guatemala. As of 2021, the operating budget for the museum was approximately 567,000 Guatemalan quetzals per year.

== Collection ==
The museum has more than 842 square meters of exhibition space, containing artwork from the pre-colonial, colonial, and Republican period and spanning more than 3,000 years.

Some of the oldest pieces in the museum's collection come from the archeological sites at Tikal National Park (in Petén Department) and Takalik Abaj (in El Asintal, Retalhuleu Department). This includes items such as the lintel of the Tikal Temple III and the burial offerings of King K'utz Chman.
