= San Martín Zapotitlán =

San Martín Zapotitlán San Martín
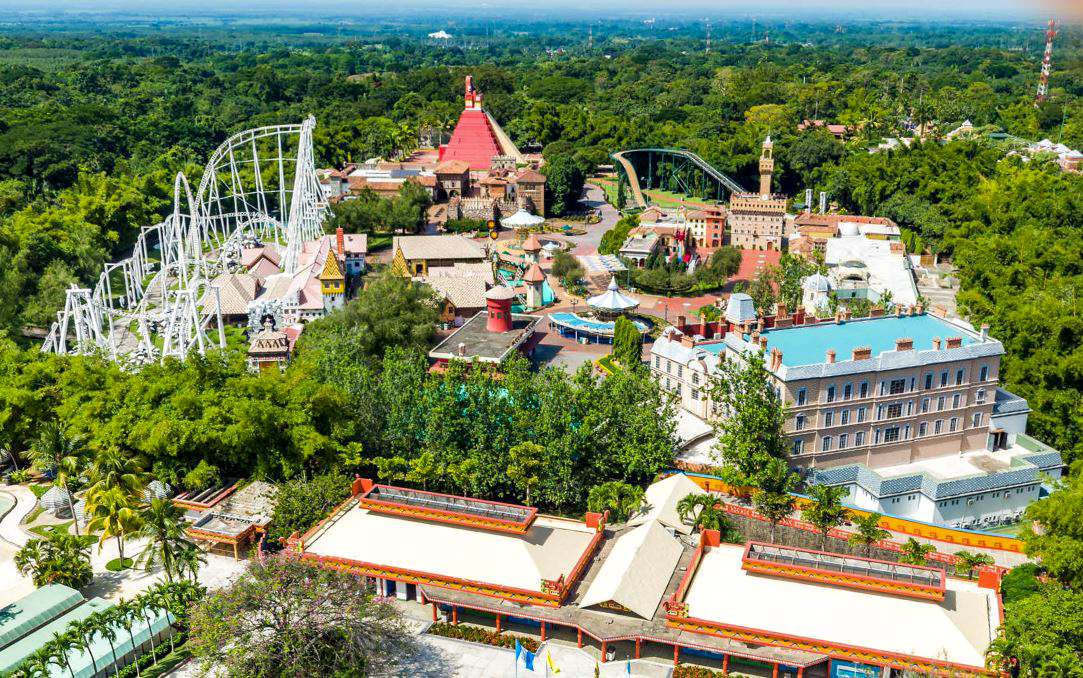
- Amusement park Xetulul
- Interactive map of San Martín Zapotitlán
- Coordinates: 14°36′N 91°36′W
- Country: Guatemala
- Department: Retalhuleu
- Established: (2020 - 2024)
- Capital: San Martín Zapotitlán

Government
  - Type: Municipal
  - Governor: Blanca Estela Mendoza

Area
  - City: 24 km^{2} (9.3 sq mi)

Population (2020)
  - City: 13,700
  - Density: 570/km^{2} (1,500/sq mi)
  - Urban: 4,110
- Time zone: UTC-6

San Martín Zapotitlán (or simply San Martín) is a small municipality in the department of Retalhuleu in Guatemala. Citizens spend every November 11 with a small fair to commemorate Martin of Tours. Its land extension is 24 km^{2}, making it the smallest municipality in Retalhuleu and one of the smallest in all around Guatemala, nevertheless, it is ranked in top 50 most important Guatemalan municipalities, thanks to the three amusement parks (Xetulul, Xocomil and Xejuyup) that were inaugurated there.

San Martín Zapotitlán has many tourist places, being Xetulul, Xocomil, Xejuyup, Club Mil Palmeras and Hostales del Irtra the most important and known. Its gross domestic product highly depends on them.

== Geographic location ==
San Martín Zapotitlán is part of Retalhuleu and it is located at around 180 km from Guatemala city. It shares borders with:

- North and west: San Felipe
- South: Santa Cruz Muluá
- East: San Andrés Villa Seca
