= Deportivo Reu =

Association football club in Guatemala

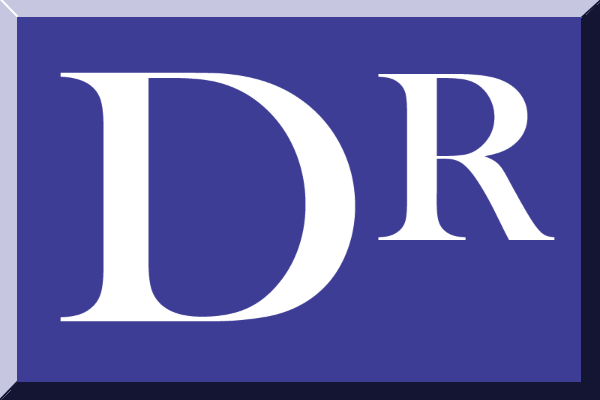
- Full name: Deportivo Reu
- Nicknames: Los Algodoneros (The Cotton Pickers); El Equipo del Pueblo (The People's Team)
- Founded: 12 June 2013; 12 years ago
- Dissolved: 15 December 2019; 5 years ago
- Ground: Estadio Dr. Óscar Monterroso Izaguirre
- Capacity: 8,000
- Chairman: (Guatemala) Kevin Escobar
- Manager: (Guatemala) Saulo Minera
- League: Segunda División de Ascenso
- Website: https://m.facebook.com/deportivoreu1/?locale2=es_LA
Home colours	Away colours

Deportivo Reu was a Guatemalan football team from Retalhuleu, Retalhuleu Department. It was founded on 12 June 2013 and currently plays in Segunda División de Ascenso, the third tier of Guatemalan football.
