= Cosanfe =

Private school in San Felipe, Guatemala

Cosanfe (officially, Colegio Particular Mixto San Felipe Cosanfe) is a registered private secondary high school/college in San Felipe, Retalhuleu, Guatemala. It is located at 3 Calle 3-14 zona 1, San Felipe, Retalhuleu, Guatemala.
