= Ixchayá River =

River in Guatemala

The Ixchayá River is a river in Guatemala flowing from the Guatemalan highlands into the Pacific Ocean. It passes through the department of Retalhuleu.
