= Xetulul Theme Park =

Theme park in Guatemala

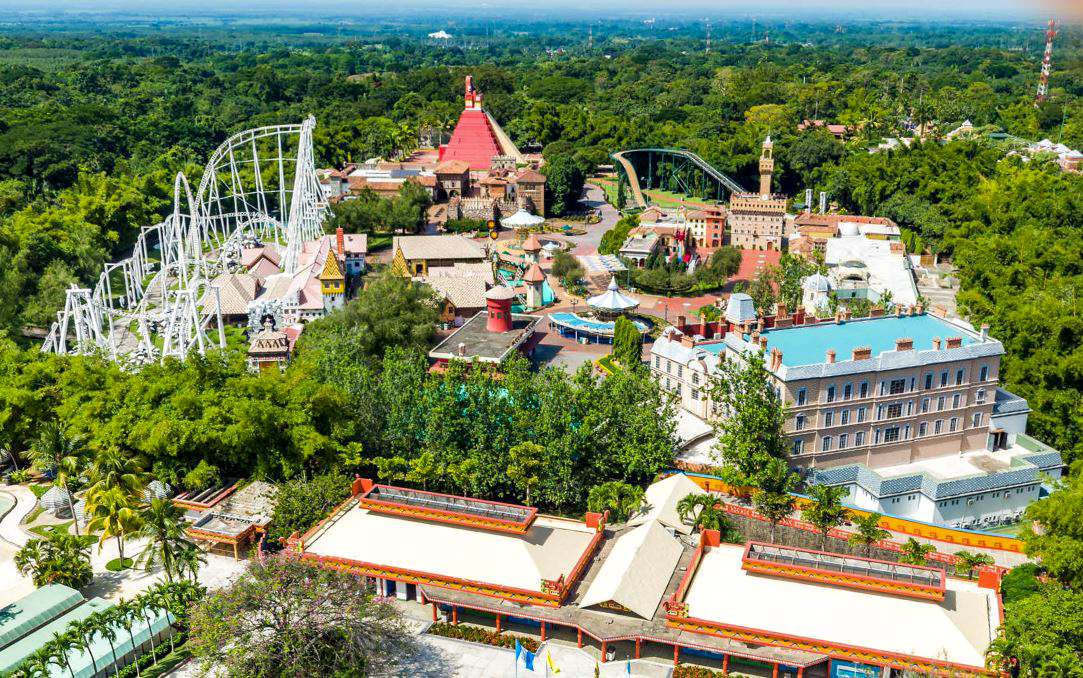
- View of the Xetulul Theme Park
- Interactive map of Xetulul Theme Park
- Location: Retalhuleu Department, Guatemala
- Coordinates: 14°35′41″N 91°36′42″W
- Status: Operating
- Opened: 29 June 2002
- Operated by: IRTRA
- Attendance: 1,000,000

Xetulul is a theme park in Guatemala. It is located in the Retalhuleu Department in the southwest of the country. Opening in 2002, Xetulul is the third-largest amusement park in Latin America, after Beto Carrero World in Penha, Santa Catarina, Brazil and Six Flags México near Mexico City, Mexico. Xetulul is associated with the nearby Xocomil water park, which opened in 1997, and together the two parks receive over one million visitors every year, making the parks the most popular tourist attraction in the country.

Xetulul and Xocomil are operated by the Institute for the Recreation of Guatemalan Private Industry Workers (IRTRA)—a private company that operates several other parks in Guatemala, as well as nearby hotels and restaurants.

== Rides ==
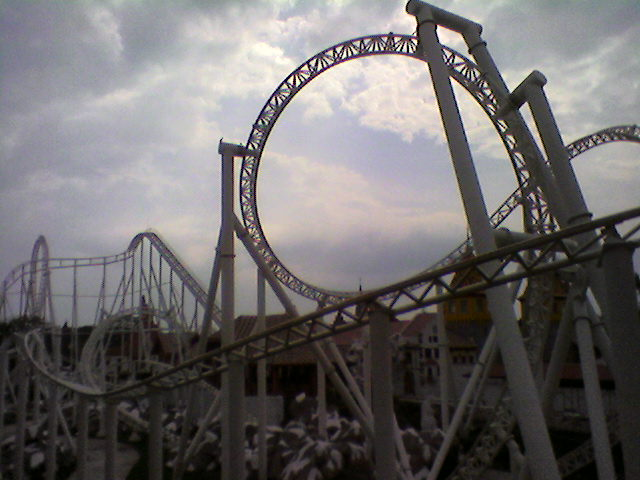
Avalancha roller coaster

Xetulul features three roller coasters: Avalancha, an eight-inversion steel roller coaster built by Intamin, which (as of September 2018) is one of 15 roller coasters in the world to have eight or more inversions. Avalancha was also Latin America's largest roller coaster when it opened. Additionally, the park has Choconoy, a smaller family roller coaster, and Ratón Feliz, a junior roller coaster built in 2014. Xetulul also features the only double-decker carousel in Central America. Also within the park is the 2 ft (610 mm) narrow-gauge Transcostero train ride built by Severn Lamb.

== Architecture and history ==
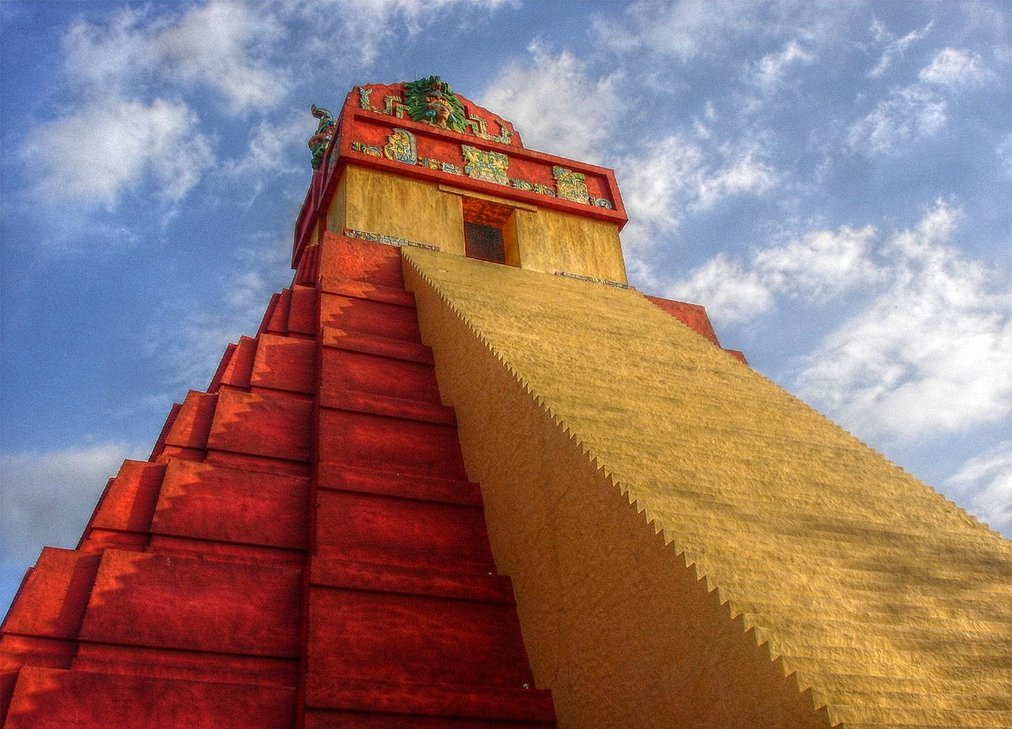
Replica of the Tikal Temple of the Great Jaguar

In addition to its amusement rides, Xetulul is also known for its architecture. The park features architectural reproductions of many landmarks from across the world, including the Trevi Fountain, Moulin Rouge, and the Tikal Temple of the Great Jaguar. The park is divided into seven plazas, which feature architecture from a total of six countries, including France, Germany, Guatemala, Italy, Spain, and Switzerland. Each national architecture style is featured in its own unique plaza.

The name "Xetulul" originates from the Kʼicheʼ language, and means "under the sapotes". There are currently plans to expand Xetulul with the addition of a golf course and a convention center.
