= Nuevo San Carlos =

Coordinates: 14°36′N 91°42′W

- Municipality
- Location in Guatemala
- Country: Guatemala
- Department: Retalhuleu Department

Area
  - Total: 42 sq mi (110 km^{2})
- Elevation: 1,230 ft (375 m)

Population (2018 census)
  - Total: 39,565
  - Density: 930/sq mi (360/km^{2})

Nuevo San Carlos is a town, with a population of 22,657 (2018 census), and a municipality in the Retalhuleu department of Guatemala.
