= Puerto Quetzal =

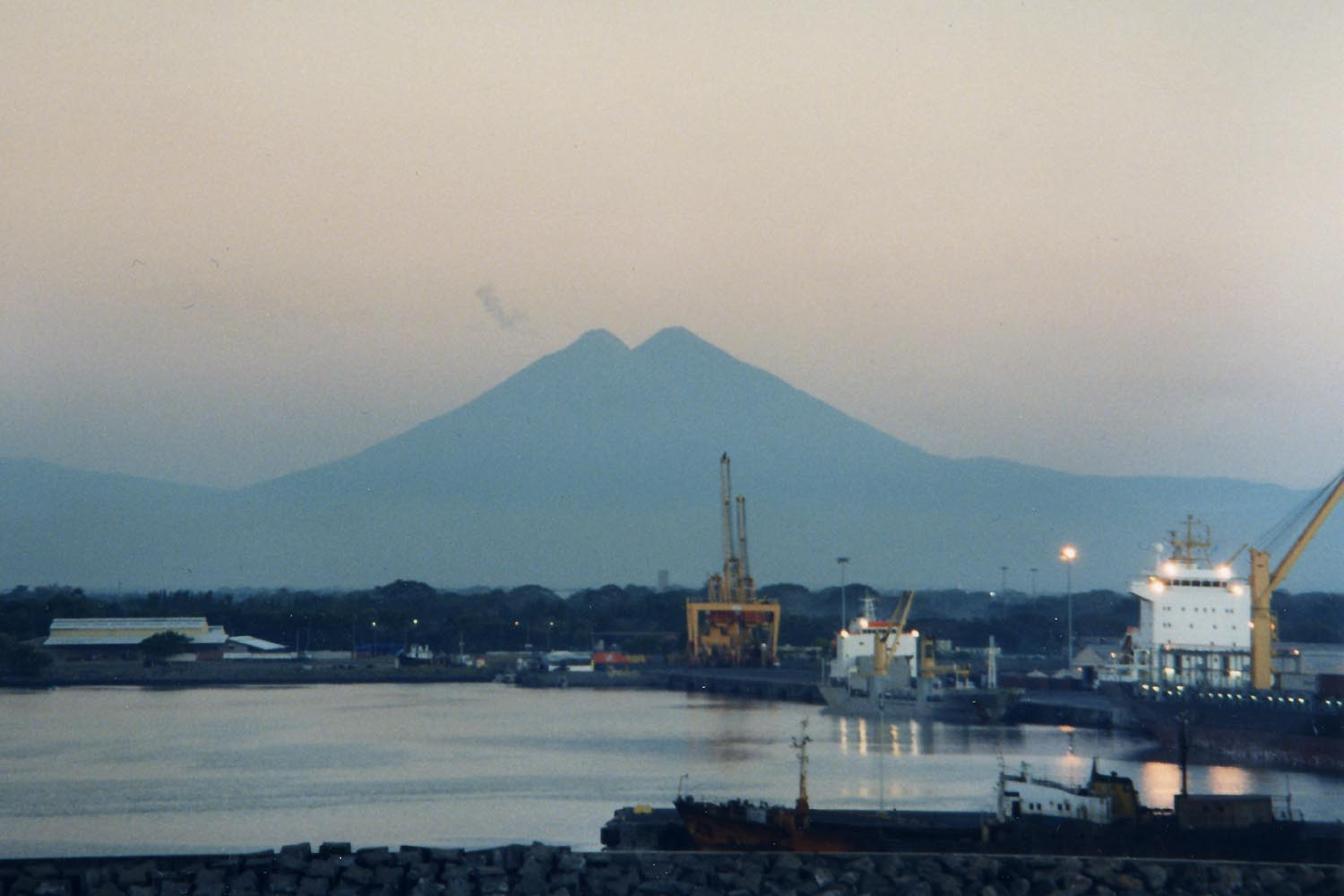
- Puerto Quetzal seen at dawn, with the volcanoes on the horizon Puerto Quetzal Cruise Port facilities

- Location in Guatemala
- Coordinates: 13°55′14″N 90°47′16″W
- Country: Guatemala
- Department: Escuintla
- Municipality: San José

Area
  - Land: 6.2 sq mi (16 km^{2})

Population
  - Total: 20,000
  - Density: 8,500/sq mi (3,300/km^{2})

Puerto Quetzal is Guatemala's largest Pacific Ocean port. It is important for both cargo traffic and as a stop-off point for cruise liners.

It is located in Escuintla department, alongside the city of Puerto San José, which it superseded as a port in importance to the country's maritime traffic during the 20th century.

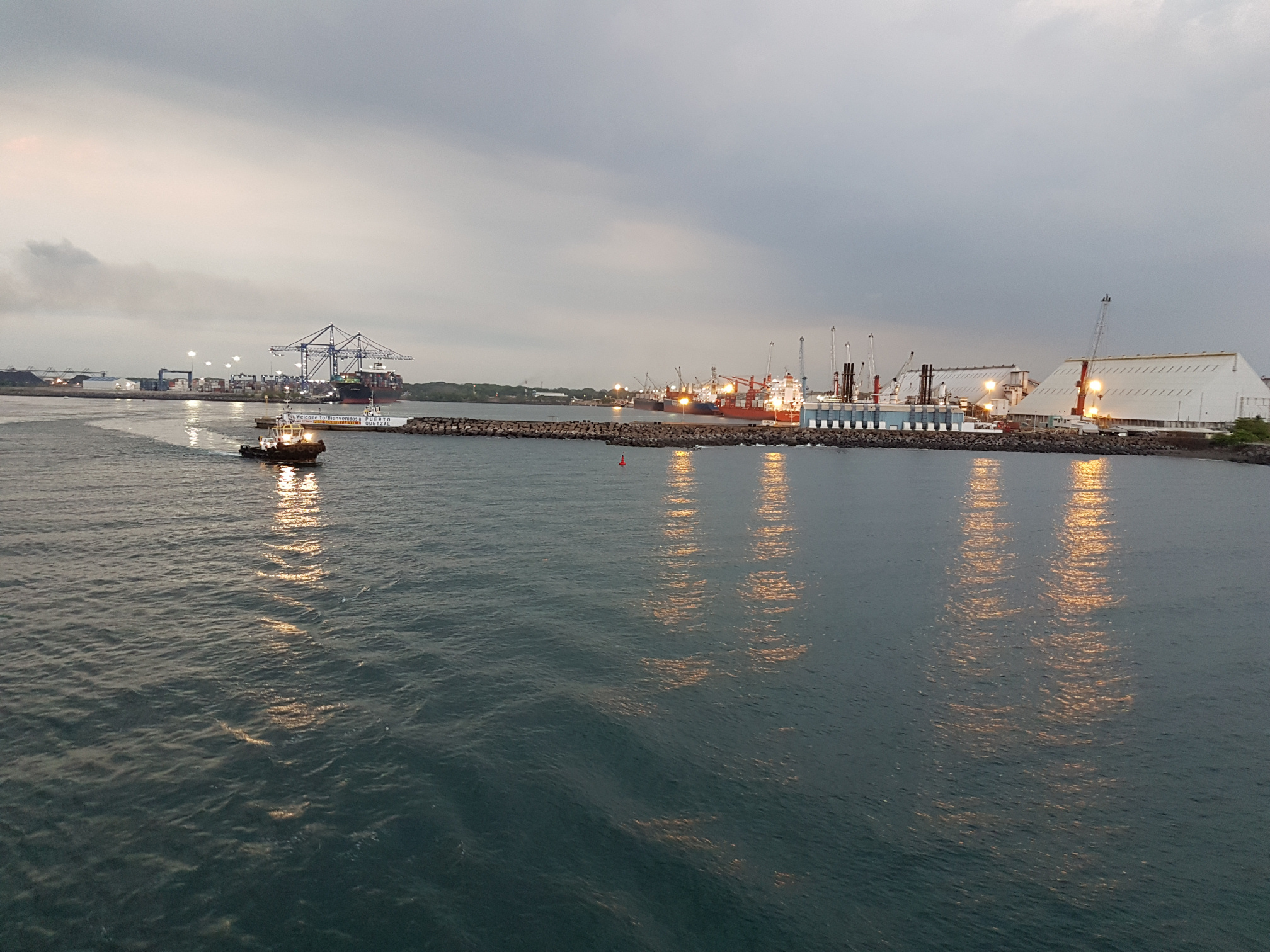
Puerto Quetzal at dusk March 2018

== See also ==
- Transport in Guatemala
