= Palacio de los Capitanes Generales, Antigua Guatemala =

Captain General Palace
- Palacio de los Capitanes Generales; Casas Reales; Palacio Real
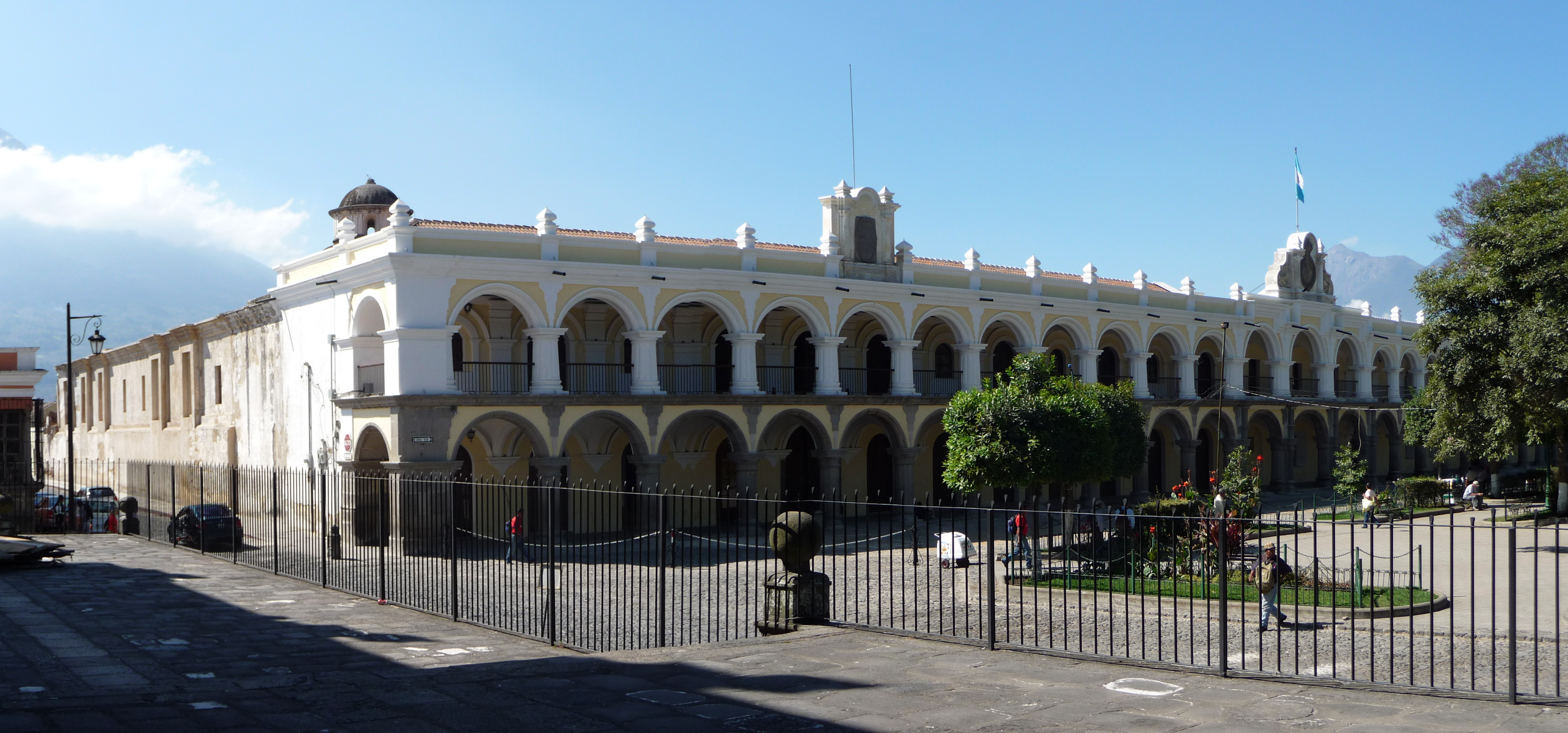
- Palace in Antigua Guatemala

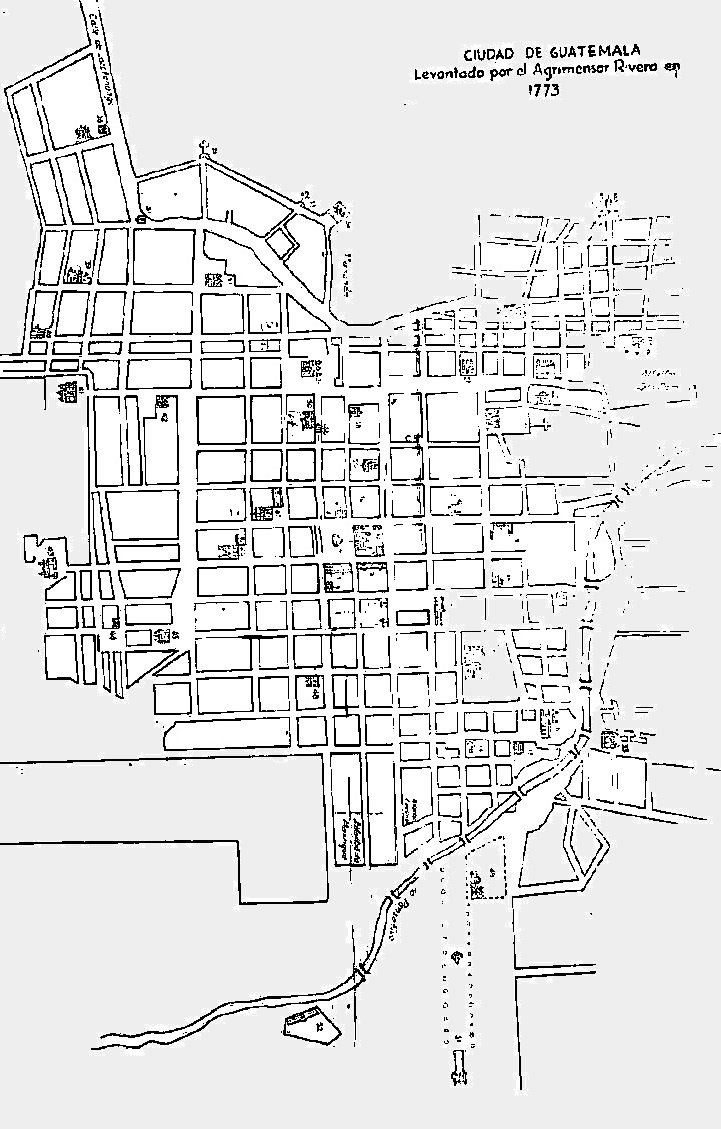
- Location within Antigua Guatemala

General information
- Location: Antigua Guatemala, Guatemala
- Coordinates: 14°33′21″N 90°44′02″W
- Construction started: 1755
- Completed: 1764
- Renovated: 1890
- Demolished: 1773

The Captain General Palace, or Palacio de los Capitanes Generales, is a large building localed in the Central Square of Antigua Guatemala. It serves as the headquarters of the Guatemala Institute of Tourism, the Antigua Tourism Association, National Police and the Sacatepquez Department government. It also houses the National Museum of Guatemalan Art.

== History ==
In the southeast corner of the Central Plaza, is located the first two-story building constructed in 1558. Made with a wooden floor and arches that support the whole structure. The General Captaincy of Guatemala was governed from this building, and inside it all the government, administrative and military offices worked there. The General Captain's, life was full of luxuries for himself, his family and friends. Construction of the Captain General residence and the Real Audiencia member began in 1558. The building also lodged the Royal Tax office, jail, Army headquarters, horse facilities and warehouses.

By 1678, the Captain General Palace was already a two-story building, with a wooden main entrance and columns.

=== San Miguel earthquakes ===
The San Miguel earthquake severely impacted the city of Santiago de los Caballeros; the Royal Palace suffered some damage in rooms and walls. This earthquake made the authorities think about moving the city to a new location less vulnerable to earthquakes, but the city inhabitants strongly opposed this measure and they even went as far as to invade the Palace to make their point. The city did not move, but a considerable number of troops were needed to restore calm. Diego de Porres, city master building fixed the Palace damage and finished by 1720; although he made some more improvements that lasted until 1736.

=== San Casimiro earthquake ===
The San Casimiro earthquakes that stroke the city of Santiago de los Caballeros de Guatemala in 1751 damaged the palace again. Its façade and levels were destroyed, but the remaining basis permitted its rebuilt, in 1755, finishing it in 1764. But the nature stroke again, when an earthquake in 1773 shook the city. An intended for transferring the building's columns was made when the city moved into the Ermita Valley, but it wasn't possible because they were too heavy.

=== Santa Marta earthquake ===
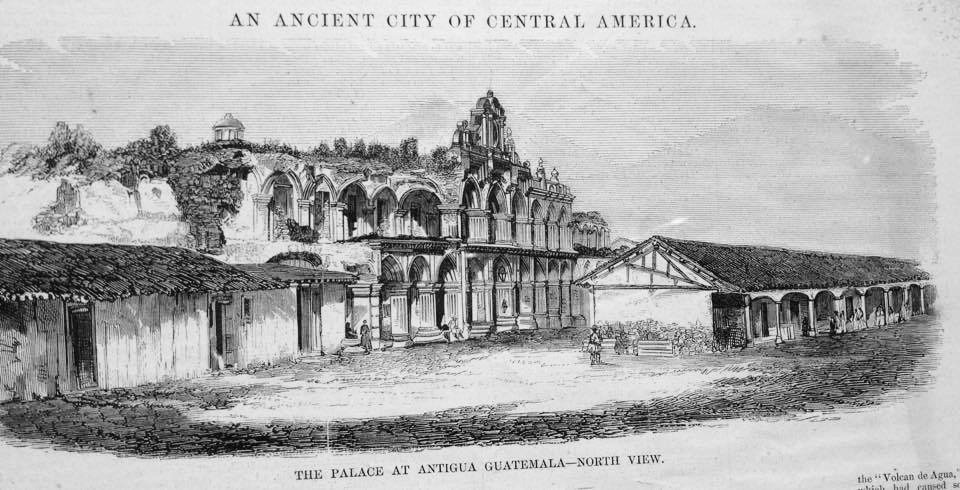
North view of the Captain Generals Palace and the makeshift warehouses where its stone pillars were stored after the Santa Marta earthquake. Image from the 1840s.

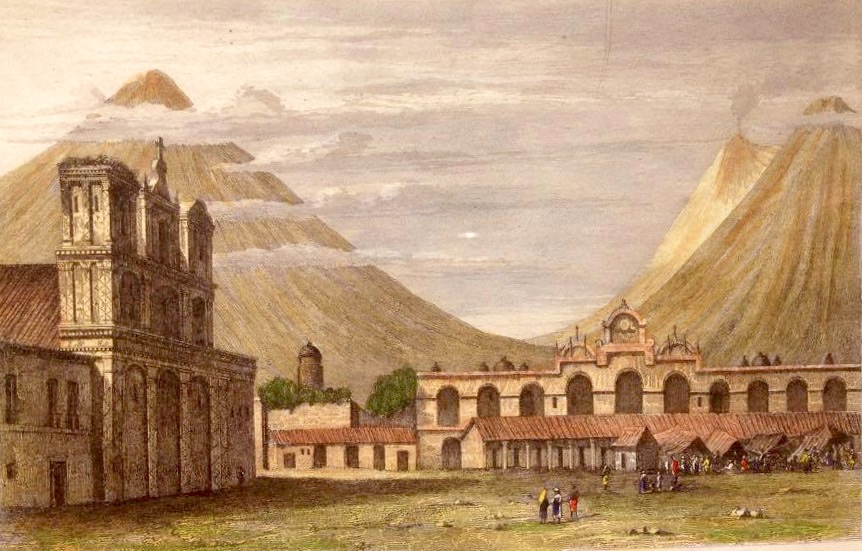
Parque central con la Parroquia de San José y cobertizos improvisados para las columnas derrumbadas del Palacio de los Capitanes Generales; 1840.

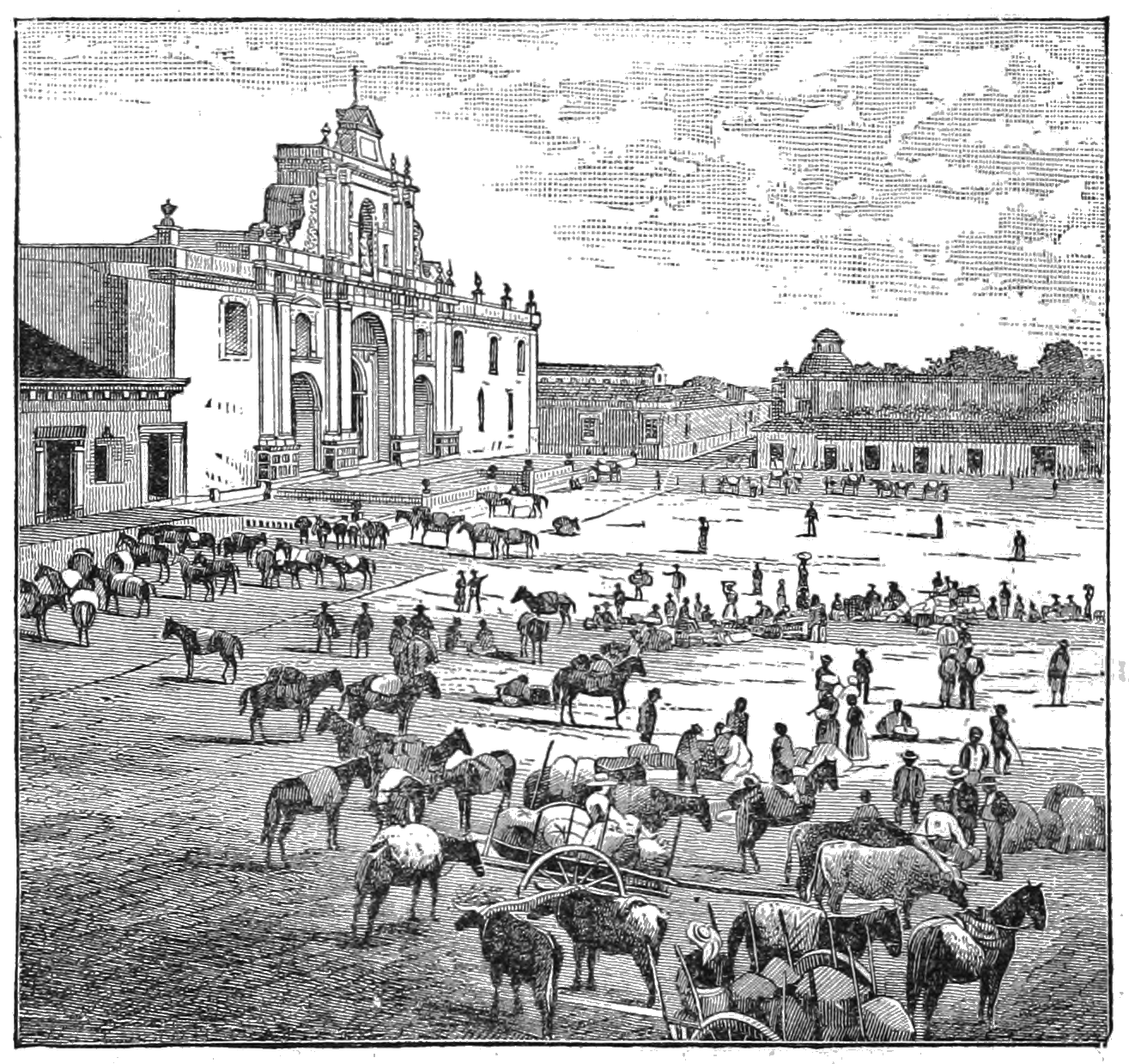
Cathedral and what is left of the Palace in an image from 1884.

On July 29, 1773, day of Saint Martha of Bethania, a very powerful earthquake hit the city of Santiago de los Caballeros at around 3:00 p.m. One hour later, an even more devastating tremor that lasted for about a minute hit the city again, in the middle of a strong thunderstorm, destroying churches, government office buildings and private homes. It also broke water and food supply chains, as the natives that provided the city fled to the mountains.

On August 2 and 4, captain general Martín de Mayorga presided over the "General Meetings" with the local authorities, including archbishop Pedro Cortés y Larraz, criollo City Hall members, and regular clergy representatives. They concluded to inform king Carlos III and the Indian Council about the destruction and the eventual move of the city to neighbor "La Ermita" valley, which was not as close to the volcanoes, which were considered the culprit for the destruction of the city at the time.

On December 13, 1773, two strong earthquakes hit the area again, resting the case of the group that wanted to move to a different location. Once 1774 the Indian Council pronounced its verdict on the city status and approved the move to "La Ermita" valley. Matías de Gálvez, between 1779 and 1783, was in charge of coordinating the move.

Possibly the damage caused by the earthquake itself was serious, but not as destructive as the one caused by the city abandonment. On January 16, 1775, master builder Bernardo Ramirez start pulling out all reusable construction material from the destroyed buildings to move it to the new capital city, because of a legal order to do so. After this, the Palace was left without doors, windows, balconies, ornaments, and so on.

== After the capital moved to La Ermita ==
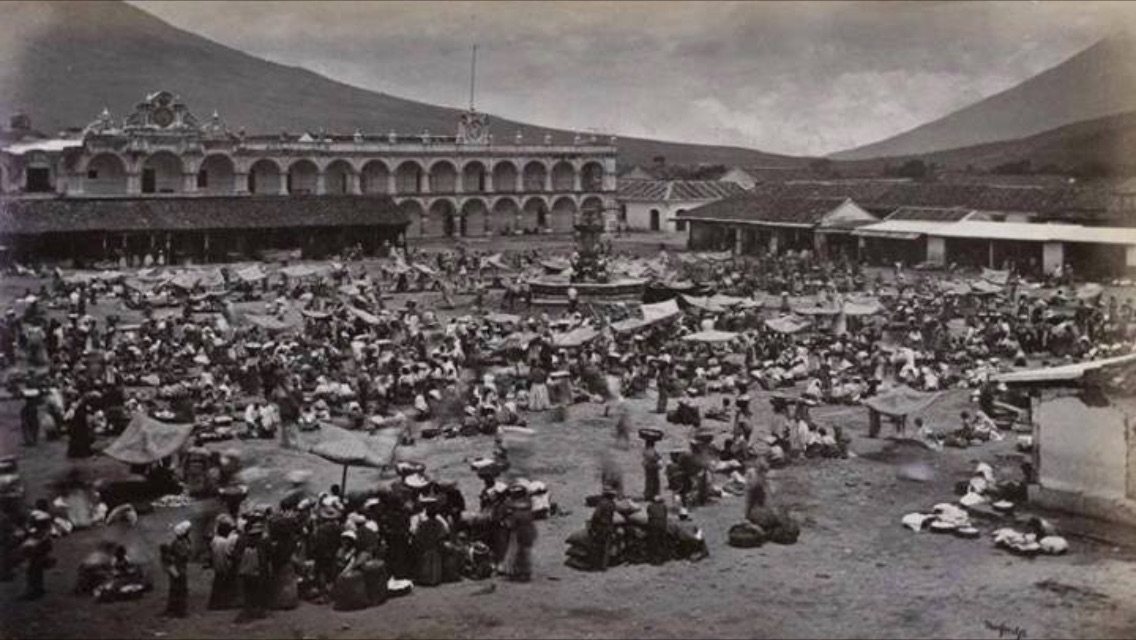
Royal Palace in 1875.

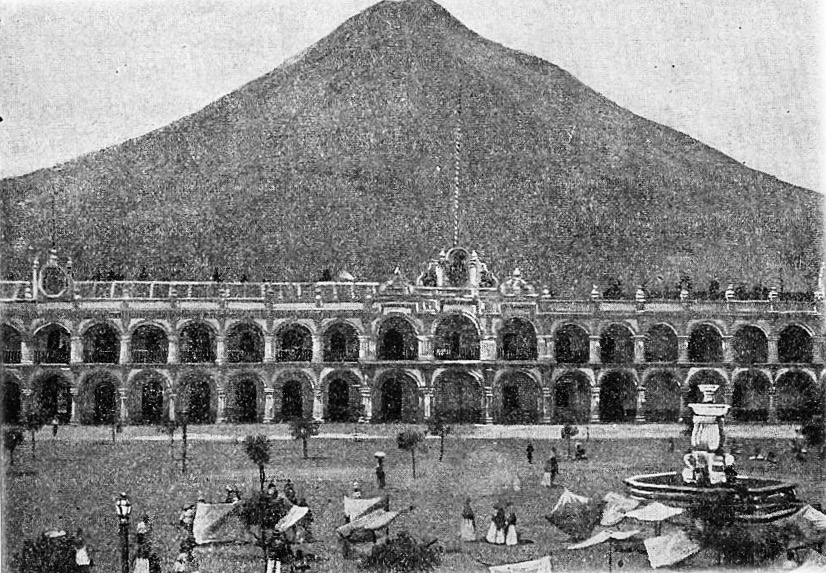
Palace after its façade was rebuilt. Image from 1896.

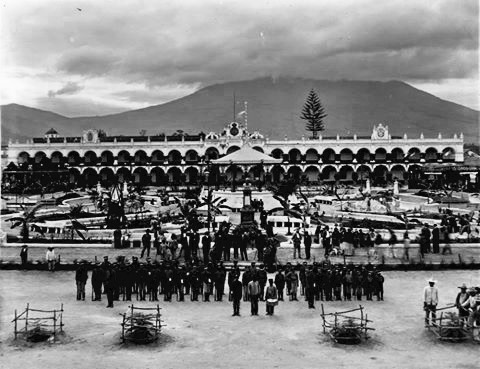
Palace and Central Square in 1920.

The city remained relatively abandoned during the 19th century, and as such, the Guatemala archbishop sold what was left of monasteries and churches to regular citizens. Some families went back to Antigua to settle there once again, so eventually there had to be some sort of authority that was established in the city and used some of the old buildings to work. Towards the end of the 19th century the old Palace façade was rebuilt, using the stone columns that had been for almost a hundred year in makeshift warehouses in front of the Palace, on the south section of Central Square. After this work, the less damaged sections were reopened: the jail and the government offices.

On February 4, 1976, Guatemala was struck again by a powerful earthquake of 7.5 in the Richter scale, which destroyed most of country infrastructure and severely damaged the Palace. Its eastern façade had to be demolished. The Palace, along with the rest of Antigua Guatemala was declared a world heritage site by UNESCO in 1979.

== Gallery ==
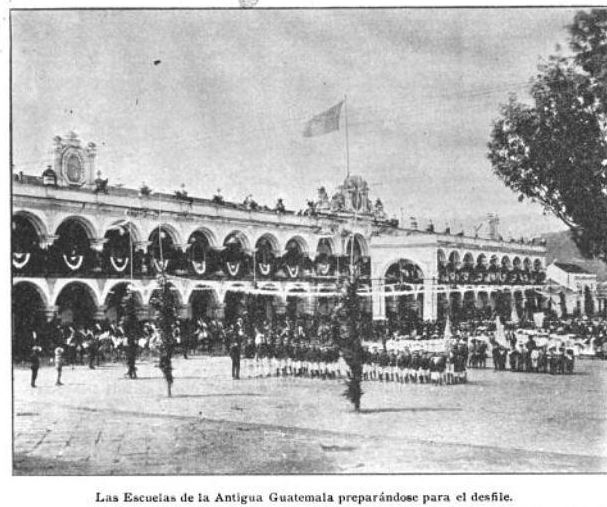
1907, Palace ready for the Fiestas Minervalias celebration.

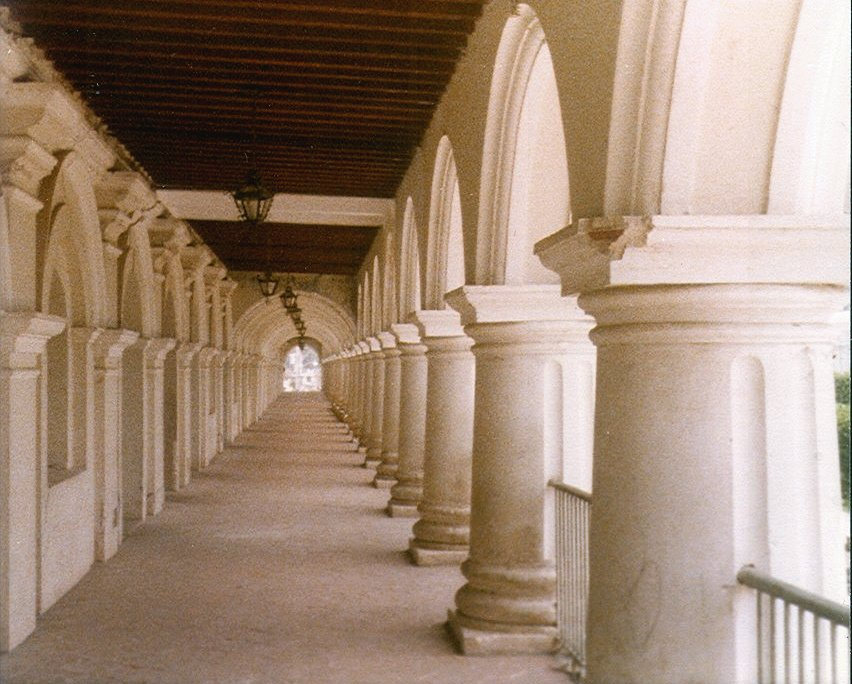
2005, arcades on the second floor.

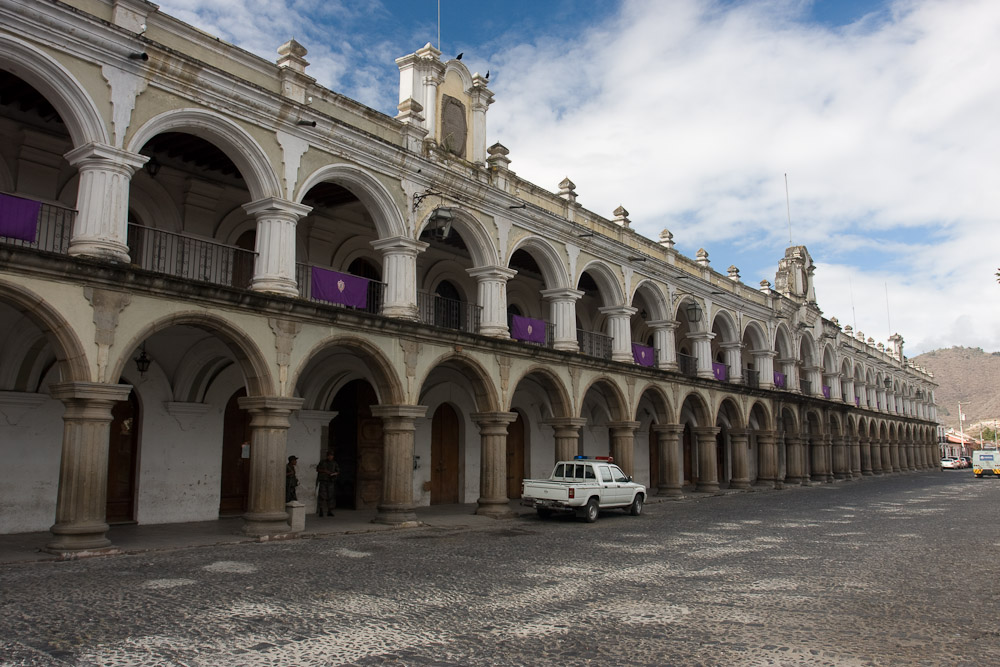

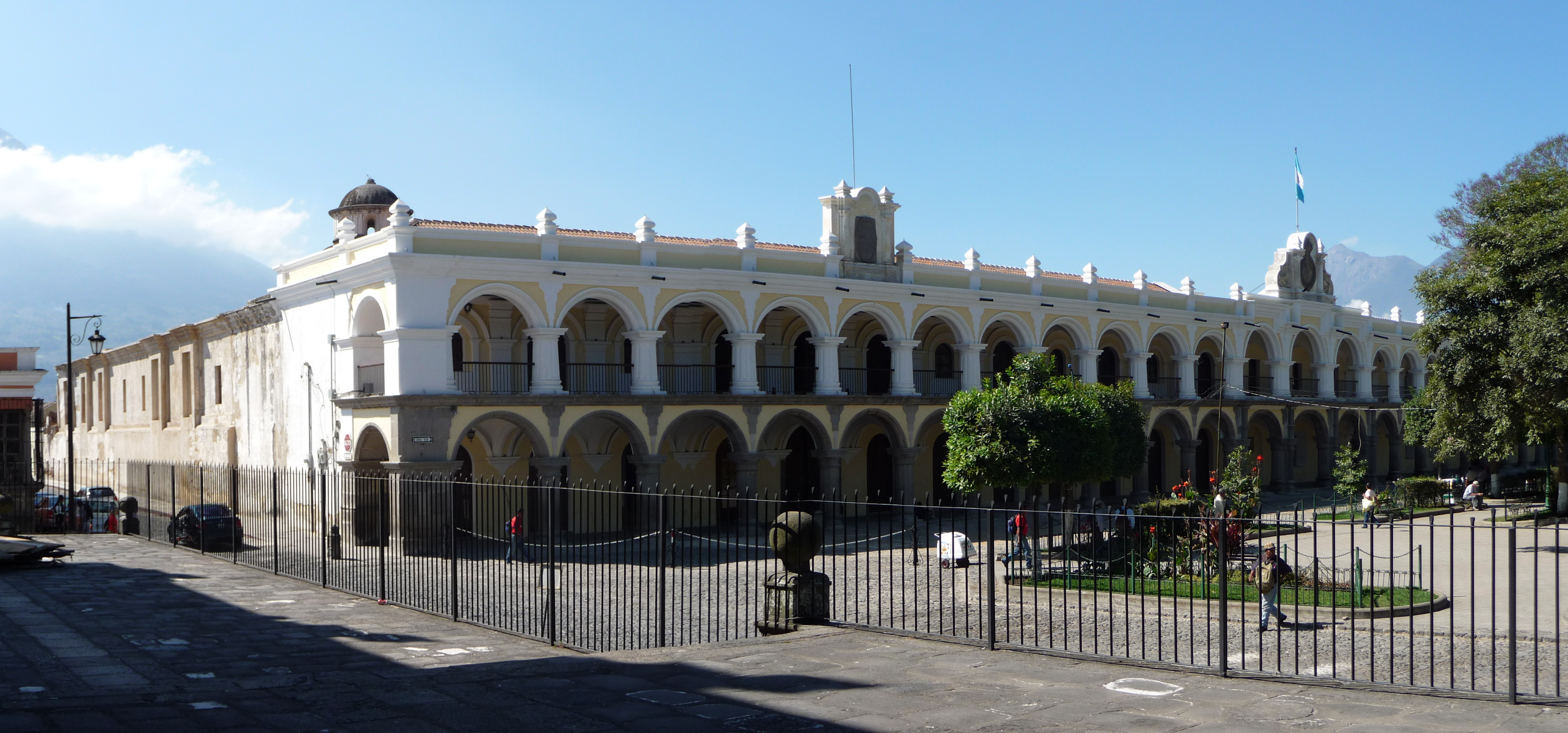
2010

== Notes and references ==
=== Bibliography ===
- "Palacio de los Capitanes". Información de la La Antigua. Archived from the original on 1 July 2008.
- Cadena, Felipe (1774). Breve descripción de la noble ciudad de Santiago de los Caballeros de Guatemala y puntual noticia de su lamentable ruina ocasionada de un violento terremoto el día veintinueve de julio de 1773 (PDF) (in Spanish). Mixco, Guatemala: Oficina de Antonio Sánchez Cubillas.
- Conkling, Alfred R. (1884). Appleton's guide to Mexico, including a chapter on Guatemala, and a complete English-Spanish vocabulary. Nueva York: D. Appleton and Company.
- Consejo Nacional para la Protección de la Antigua (n.d.), Guía del Consejo Nacional para la protección de la Antigua (in Spanish), Guatemala
- De Guate (2012). "El Terremoto de Santa Marta". De Guate (in Spanish). Archived from the original on 1 February 2014.
- Gobierno de Guatemala (1907). Álbum de Minerva 1907 (in Spanish). Vol. VII. Guatemala: Tipografía Nacional.
- Moncada Maya, J. Omar (2003). "En torno a la destrucción de la Ciudad de Guatemala, 1773. Una carta del Ingeniero Militar Antonio Marín". Biblio 3W. Revista Bibliográfica de Geografía y Ciencias Sociales (in Spanish). VIII (444). Barcelona: Universidad de Barcelona. ISSN 1138-9796.
- Rodríguez Girón, Zoila; Flores, José Alejandro; Garnica, Marlen (1995). Laporte, L.P; Escobedo, H. (eds.). "El real palacio de Antigua Guatemala: arqueología y propuesta de rehabilitación" (PDF). Simposio de investigaciones arqueológicas en Guatemala. Guatemala: Museo Nacional de Arquelogía y Etnología, digital version. Archived from the original (PDF) on 2011-09-14.
- Universidad de San Carlos de Guatemala (28 November 2012). "Las ruinas sísmicas de la ciudad de Guatemala" (PDF). Desastres en Guatemala. Guatemala: Universidad de San Carlos de Guatemala.
