= San Felipe, Retalhuleu =

Coordinates: 14°37′14″N 91°35′46″W

- municipality
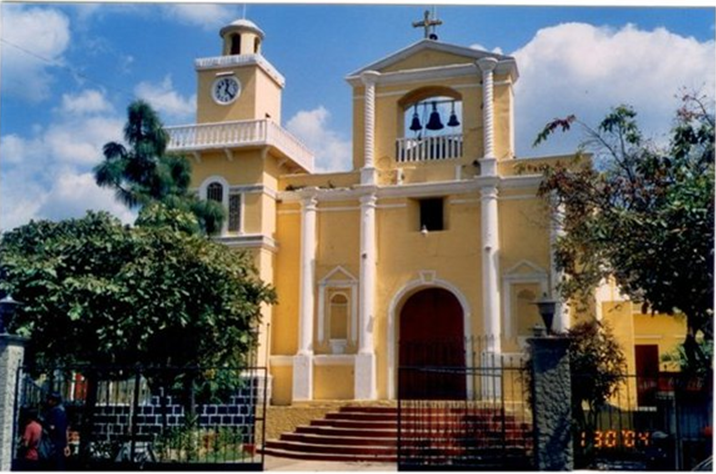
- La Iglesia
- Nickname: El Pueblo Champel
- Interactive map of San Felipe, Retalhuleu
- Country: Guatemala
- Department: Retalhuleu
- Municipalidad: San Felipe Retalhuleu

Government
  - Type: Municipal
  - Alcalde: William Valiente es el actual Alcalde del Pueblo Champel

Area
  - Land: 43 km^{2} (17 sq mi)
- Elevation: 614 m (2,014 ft)

Population (2018 census)
  - municipality: 24,446
  - Density: 568/km^{2} (1,470/sq mi)
  - Urban: 17,360
- Climate: Am

San Felipe is a town, with a population of 17,360 (2018 census), and a municipality in Retalhuleu Department, situated on the road to Quetzaltenango between El Palmar, Quetzaltenango to the north-west and San Martin Zapotitlan to the south side.

== Geography ==
Geographically, the municipality of San Felipe, Retalhuleu comprises the northern tip of the department of Retalhuleu (borders to the west with department of Quetzaltenango and to the east with the Suchitepéquez Department). Of the population, many people live in the rural areas, namely Aldea Vela, Canton Tierra Colorada and Aldea El Palmarcito among others.

== Barrios ==
1. El Centro
2. La Linterna
3. La Llovizna
4. La Piedad 1
5. La Piedad 2
6. Camilo Alvarado
7. El Jardincito
8. El Campo
9. Colonia El Esfuerzo
10. Colonia Fegua
11. El Condado San Felipe
12. Residenciales La Perla
13. Residenciales La Cachita
14. Residenciales Bella Julia
