= Dr. Óscar Monterroso Izaguirre Stadium =

Stadium in Retalhuleu, Guatemala

Coordinates: 14°32′24″N 91°40′50″W

Estadio Dr. Óscar Monterroso Izaguirre
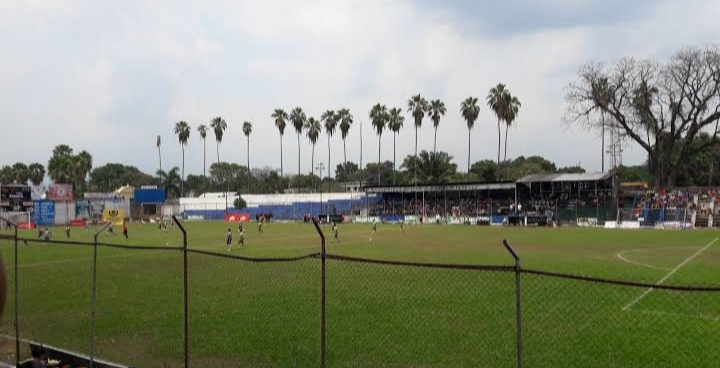
- Interactive map of Estadio Dr. Óscar Monterroso Izaguirre
- Location: Retalhuleu, Guatemala
- Capacity: 8,000
- Surface: Grass
- Field size: 104 m × 68 m (341 ft × 223 ft)

Construction
- Opened: 1966

Tenants
- Juventud Retalteca (1966–2012, 2019–present); Deportivo Reu (2013–2019); Guatemala national football team (selected matches)

The Dr. Óscar Monterroso Izaguirre Stadium (Spanish: Estadio Dr. Óscar Monterroso Izaguirre) is a multi-purpose stadium in Retalhuleu, Guatemala. It is mainly used mostly for football matches and hosts the home matches of Deportivo Reu of the Guatemalan Primera División de Ascenso. The stadium has a capacity of 8,000 spectators.
