= Puerto San José =

- Town
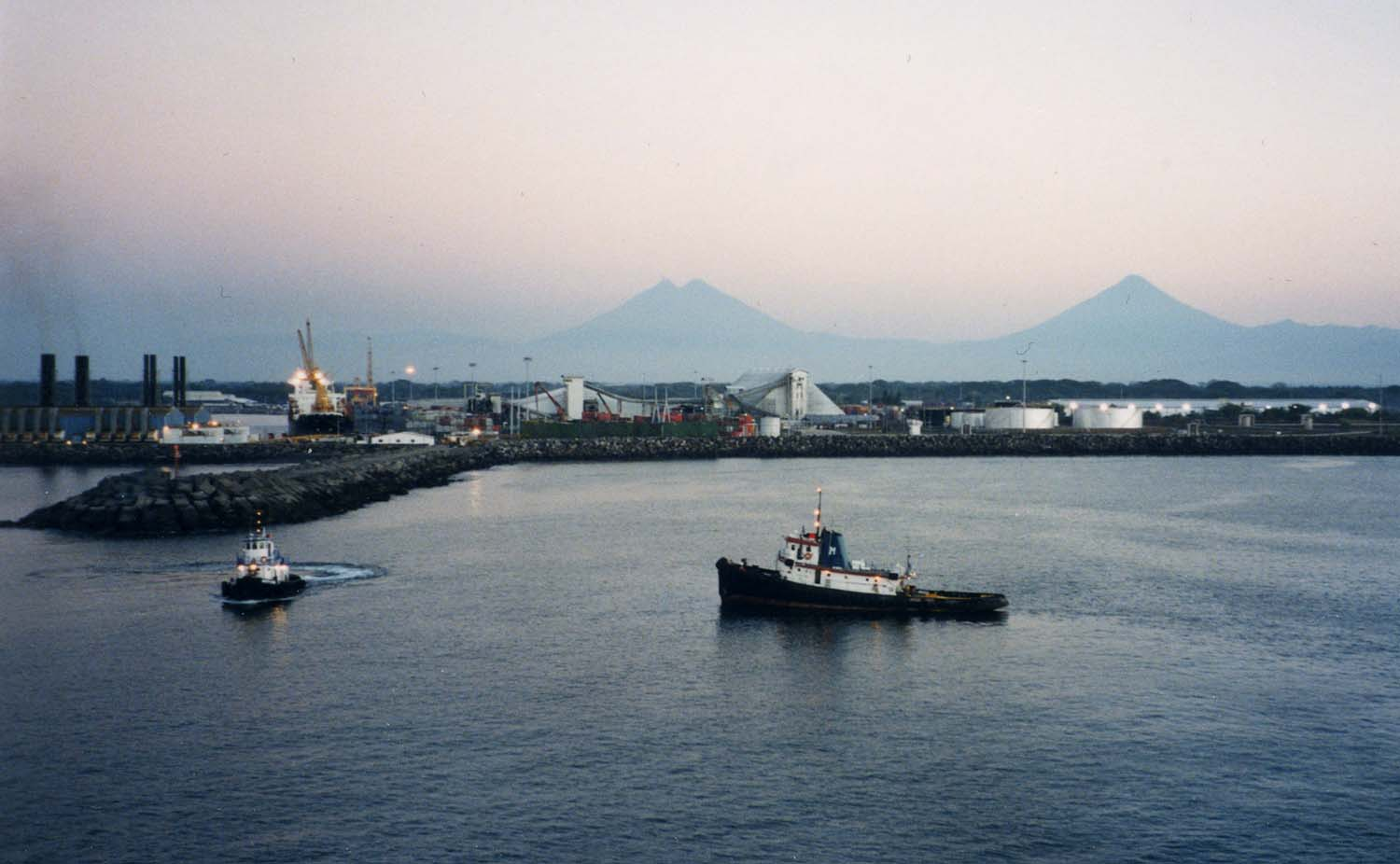
- Puerto Quetzal seen at dawn, with the volcanoes on the horizon

- Location in Guatemala
- Coordinates: 13°55′25″N 90°49′12″W
- Country: Guatemala
- Department: Escuintla
- Municipality: San José
- Elevation: 21 ft (6.4 m)

Population
  - Total: 23,887
- Time zone: UTC-06:00 (CST)

Puerto San José, also known as Port of San José, is a town on Guatemala's Pacific Ocean coast, in the department of Escuintla. It has a population of 23,887 (2018 census), making it the largest town on the nation's Pacific coast.

For centuries it served as the Pacific port for Guatemala, but was superseded in the 20th century by Puerto Quetzal, four kilometres to the east. The Puerto Quetzal complex is the major employer in the district.

The local tourist industry caters largely to weekenders from Guatemala City. San José Airport has been refurbished lately and is now the official alternate airport for Guatemala City.

== Climate ==
Puerto San José has a tropical savanna climate (Köppen: Aw) with a wet season from May to October, and a dry season from November to April.

Climate data for Puerto San José (San José Airport) (1991–2020)
Month	Jan	Feb	Mar	Apr	May	Jun	Jul	Aug	Sep	Oct	Nov	Dec	Year
Record high °C (°F)	38.7 (101.7)	39.0 (102.2)	40.3 (104.5)	39.8 (103.6)	39.2 (102.6)	36.4 (97.5)	36.6 (97.9)	36.0 (96.8)	35.6 (96.1)	35.4 (95.7)	35.2 (95.4)	36.8 (98.2)	40.3 (104.5)
Mean daily maximum °C (°F)	32.6 (90.7)	33.3 (91.9)	34.2 (93.6)	34.7 (94.5)	33.6 (92.5)	32.6 (90.7)	32.9 (91.2)	32.9 (91.2)	32.0 (89.6)	31.8 (89.2)	32.3 (90.1)	32.4 (90.3)	32.9 (91.2)
Daily mean °C (°F)	26.4 (79.5)	27.1 (80.8)	28.3 (82.9)	29.4 (84.9)	29.1 (84.4)	28.5 (83.3)	28.6 (83.5)	28.4 (83.1)	27.7 (81.9)	27.5 (81.5)	27.2 (81.0)	26.6 (79.9)	27.9 (82.2)
Mean daily minimum °C (°F)	19.4 (66.9)	19.9 (67.8)	21.1 (70.0)	22.7 (72.9)	23.2 (73.8)	23.2 (73.8)	22.8 (73.0)	22.9 (73.2)	22.9 (73.2)	22.7 (72.9)	21.5 (70.7)	20.2 (68.4)	21.9 (71.4)
Record low °C (°F)	12.3 (54.1)	14.6 (58.3)	14.6 (58.3)	17.0 (62.6)	18.9 (66.0)	20.7 (69.3)	19.4 (66.9)	20.3 (68.5)	20.7 (69.3)	19.2 (66.6)	15.8 (60.4)	15.0 (59.0)	12.3 (54.1)
Average precipitation mm (inches)	0.9 (0.04)	5.8 (0.23)	10.2 (0.40)	37.6 (1.48)	197.0 (7.76)	303.1 (11.93)	233.2 (9.18)	291.5 (11.48)	289.6 (11.40)	262.3 (10.33)	64.5 (2.54)	6.5 (0.26)	1,702.2 (67.02)
Average precipitation days (≥ 1.0 mm)	0.1	0.2	0.8	2.6	10.5	14.7	13.4	14.8	14.6	13.0	4.0	0.5	89.2
Source: NOAA
