= Avalancha (roller coaster) =

Steel roller coaster

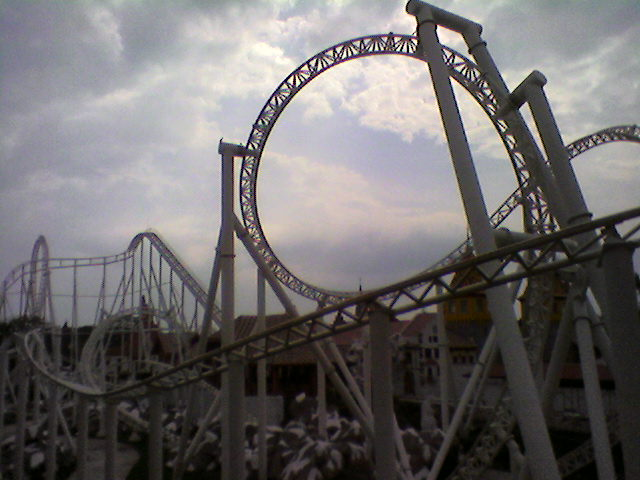

Xetulul Theme Park
- Location: Xetulul Theme Park
- Coordinates: 14.5946271°N 91.6133858°W
- Status: Operating
- Opening date: 2002

General statistics
- Type: Steel
- Manufacturer: Intamin
- Model: Multi-loop
- Speed: 54.7 mph (88.0 km/h)
- Inversions: 8
- Avalancha at RCDB

Avalancha is a steel roller coaster at Xetulul Theme Park that opened in 2002.
