= San Sebastián, Retalhuleu =

Coordinates: 14°34′N 91°39′W

San Sebastián
- Municipality
- Location in Guatemala
- Country: Guatemala
- Department: Retalhuleu Department

Area
  - Municipality: 11.0 sq mi (28.4 km^{2})
- Elevation: 1,014 ft (309 m)

Population (2018 census)
  - Municipality: 29,167
  - Density: 2,660/sq mi (1,030/km^{2})
  - Urban: 9,362
- Climate: Am

San Sebastián is a town and municipality in the Retalhuleu department of Guatemala.
