= San José, Escuintla =

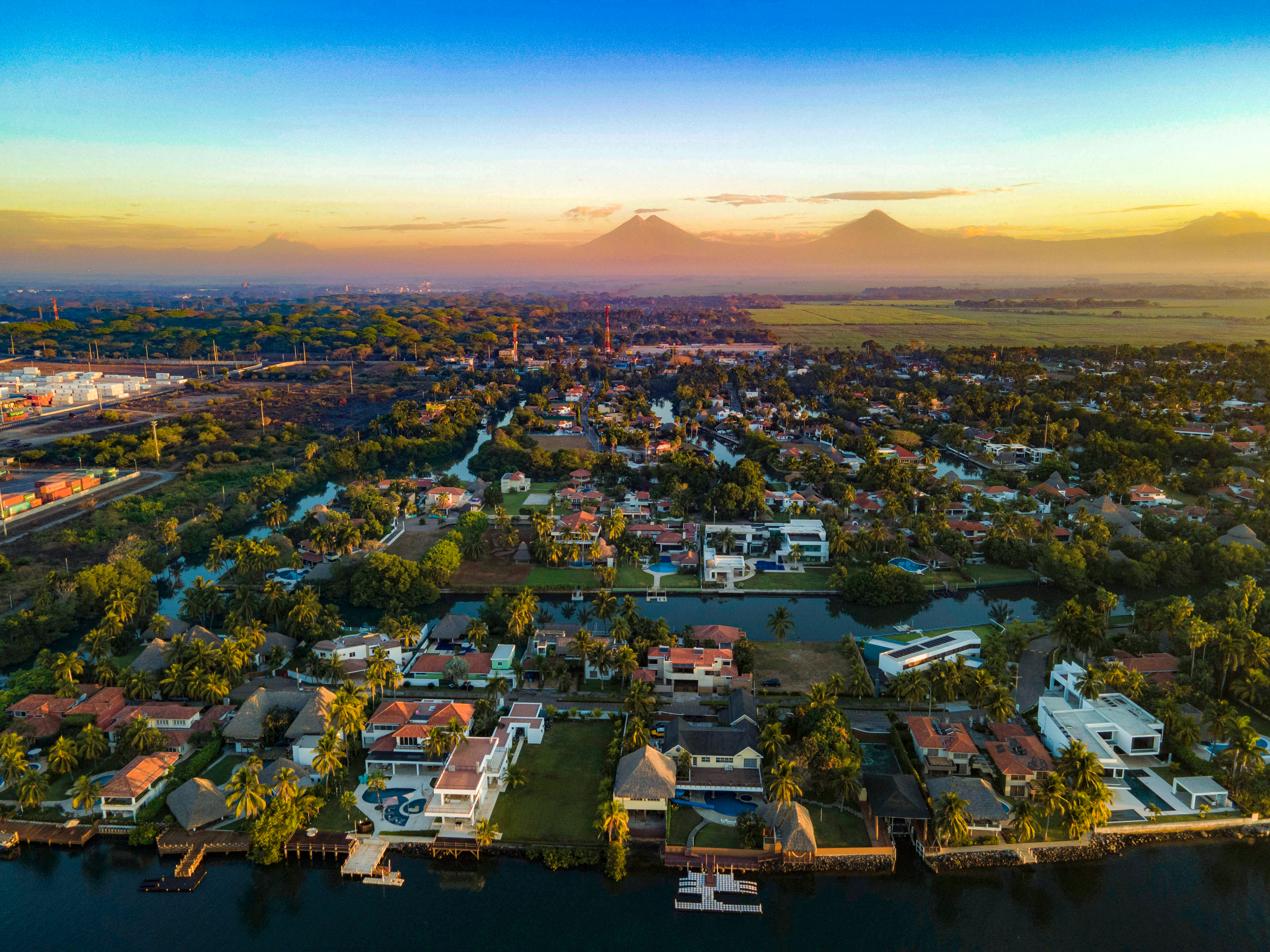
- Puerto San José

- Location in Guatemala San José, Escuintla (Guatemala)
- Coordinates: 13°58′N 90°52′W
- Country: Guatemala
- Department: Escuintla

Area
  - Total: 86.4 sq mi (223.8 km^{2})

Population (2023)
  - Total: 69,316
  - Density: 802.2/sq mi (309.7/km^{2})

San José is a municipality in the Escuintla department of Guatemala. It covers an area of approximately 223.8 km^{2} (86.4 sq mi). As per 2023 estimates, it has a population of about 69,316 inhabitants.

== History ==
In the 19th century, Iztapa was the only port in the region, which existed for a while, and the trade was largely conducted from Acajutla (now in El Salvador). After the independence of Guatemala, the government planned for a new port in 1851. Based on a report by the committee appointed to study the same, the government issued decree No.62 on 12 March 1852, which moved the port of Iztapa to El Zapote effective 1 January 1853, and the port was named as San Jose de Guatemala. The port was moved to the new city on 13 July 1853. On 2 January 1875, San José was elevated as a municipality.

== Geography ==
San Jose is a municipality in the Escuintla Department in Guatemala. It is spread over an area of 223.8 km^{2} (86.4 sq mi). It lies in the northern part of the department, about 57 km (35 mi) from the departmental capital of Escuintla and 112 km (70 mi) from the national capital of Guatemala city. It borders the municipalities of Masagua and La Demorcracia to the north, Iztapa to the east, La Gomera to the west, and Pacific Ocean to the south.

Located at an elevation of 1.98 m (6 ft 6 in) above sea level, Puerto San Jose has a tropical monsoon climate (Köppen climate classification: Am). The municipality has an average annual temperature of 25.204 °C (77.367 °F), and receives about 118.52 mm (4.666 in) of rainfall annually.

== Demographics ==
The municipality had an estimated population of 69,316 inhabitants in 2023. The population consisted of 35,406 males and 33,910 females. About 28.4% of the population was below the age of fourteen, and 5.0% was over the age of 65 years. Majority of the population (62%) was classified as rural, while 38% lived in urban areas. About 79.8% of the inhabitants were born in the same municipality. Ladinos (96.3%) formed the major ethnic group, with Maya (2.9%) forming a small minority. The municipality had a literacy rate of 87.6%, and Spanish (97.9%) was the most spoken language.

== Economy ==
Agriculture and agro-based industries are the major contributor to the economy, along with tourism and port services. The municipality contains Puerto Quetzal, Guatemala's largest Pacific port. The port generates more than seven million quetzales in income annually and employs an estimated 4,000 people.
