= La Libertad, Petén =

La Libertad

- Location in Guatemala
- Coordinates: 16°47′10″N 90°07′00″W
- Country: Guatemala
- Department: El Petén

Government
  - Mayor: Benjamin Ipiña (LIDER)

Population (2023)
  - Total: 87,572
- Climate: Am

La Libertad (Spanish pronunciation: [la liβeɾˈtað]) is a municipality in the El Petén department of Guatemala. It contains 79,416 people and has abundant oil reserves that have been commercialized by international oil companies since the 1980s.

== History ==
=== Dos Erres massacre ===
In October 1982, guerrillas ambushed an army convoy near Palestina, in the vicinity of Dos Erres. They killed 21 soldiers and took 19 rifles. On 4 December, a contingent of 58 Kaibiles (the elite special forces commandos of the Guatemalan Army) was flown into the area. The following day, they received orders to disguise themselves as guerrillas, deploy to Dos Erres and kill the inhabitants, who were considered guerrilla sympathizers. Dressed as guerrillas, the Kaibiles arrived in the hamlet at 02:30 hrs on 6 December. They forced the inhabitants out of their homes, corralling the men in the schoolhouse and the women and children in the hamlet's two churches. A subsequent search uncovered no sign of weapons or guerrilla propaganda. At 06:00, officers consulted superiors by radio, then informed the commandos they would be "vaccinating" the inhabitants after breakfast.

On 6 December 1982, during the de facto presidency of General Efraín Ríos Montt, over 200 people – including women, the elderly, and children – were killed there by commandos working as government forces as a part of the government's scorched earth policy.

The massacre continued throughout 7 December. On the morning of 8 December, as the Kaibiles were preparing to leave, another 15 persons, among them children, arrived in the hamlet. Allegedly, the kaibiles took the newcomers to a location half an hour away, then shot all but two of them.

== Climate ==
La Libertad’s municipal capital is 188 metres or 617 feet above sea level. The municipality has a tropical monsoon climate (Köppen: Am) with very warm to hot weather year round, a wet season from May to November, and a drier season with moderate rain from December to April.

Climate data for Flores
Month	Jan	Feb	Mar	Apr	May	Jun	Jul	Aug	Sep	Oct	Nov	Dec	Year
Mean daily maximum °C (°F)	26.6 (79.9)	27.7 (81.9)	29.1 (84.4)	30.9 (87.6)	32.1 (89.8)	31.7 (89.1)	30.2 (86.4)	30.6 (87.1)	30.1 (86.2)	28.8 (83.8)	27.5 (81.5)	26.4 (79.5)	29.3 (84.8)
Daily mean °C (°F)	22.4 (72.3)	23.0 (73.4)	24.5 (76.1)	26.2 (79.2)	27.5 (81.5)	27.4 (81.3)	26.2 (79.2)	26.4 (79.5)	26.0 (78.8)	24.9 (76.8)	23.4 (74.1)	22.1 (71.8)	25.0 (77.0)
Mean daily minimum °C (°F)	18.2 (64.8)	18.3 (64.9)	20.0 (68.0)	21.6 (70.9)	23.0 (73.4)	23.2 (73.8)	22.2 (72.0)	22.2 (72.0)	22.0 (71.6)	21.0 (69.8)	19.3 (66.7)	17.9 (64.2)	20.7 (69.3)
Average rainfall mm (inches)	79 (3.1)	61 (2.4)	42 (1.7)	41 (1.6)	149 (5.9)	226 (8.9)	203 (8.0)	204 (8.0)	264 (10.4)	232 (9.1)	136 (5.4)	105 (4.1)	1,742 (68.6)
Source: Climate-Data.org

== Natural resources ==
=== Oil ===
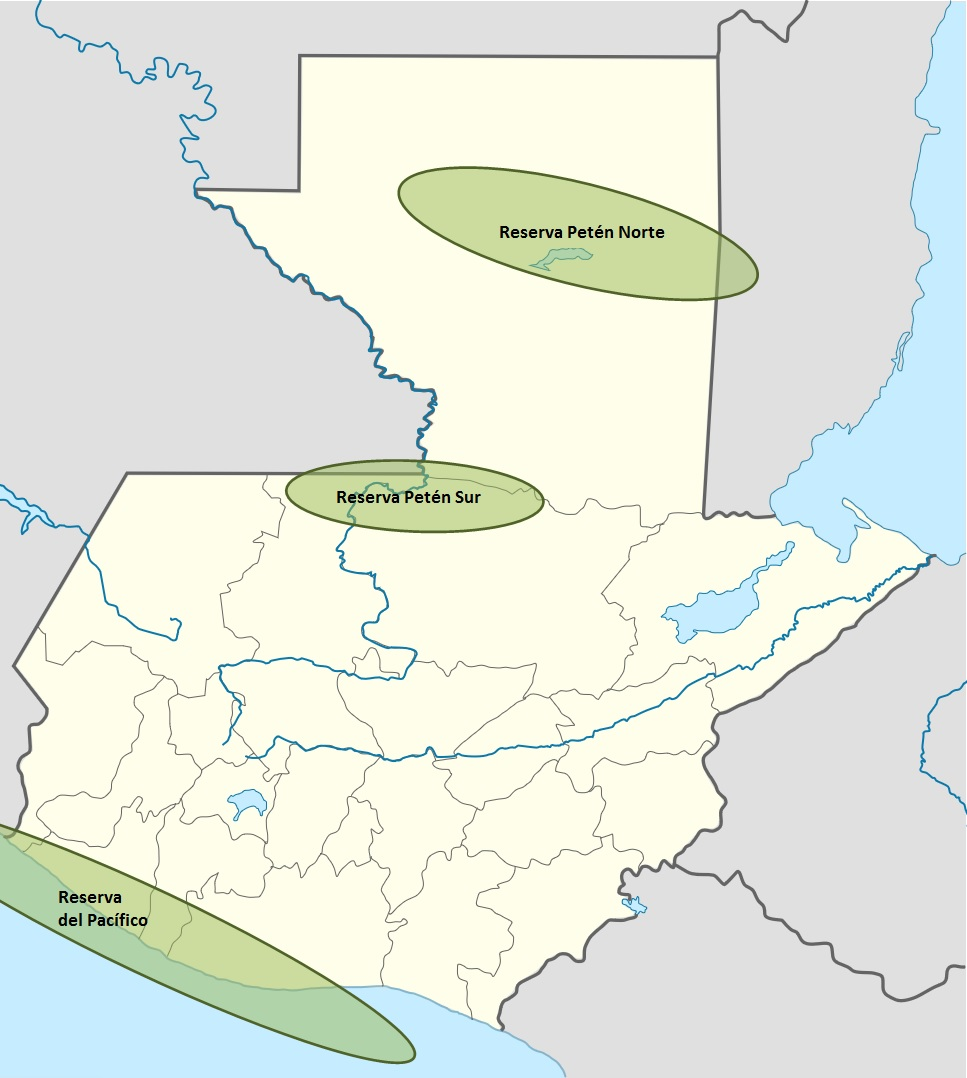
Guatemala oil reserves.

Concession contract # 2-85 refers to "Xan field" (47 drilled wells), whose exploration started in the mid 1950s. This contract was initially subscribed with the Basic Resources company, founded in the 1960s by John D. Park, one of the lawyers that worked in the Guatemalan Oil Code after the counter-revolution in 1954. Basic Resources started exploring possible oil wells during the 1970s and began the commercial production in the 1980s, in the middle of the Guatemala Civil War. During the 1970s, Basic Resources joins "Operación Conjunta", which is a combined effort led by the French public company Elf Aquitaine.

By 1993, Basic Resources had a refinery setup in La Libertad, and an oil pipeline all the way to the Xan wells in Laguna del Tigre. In 1985, Basic Resources had signed contract 2-85 with the Guatemalan government for 25 years. However, in the mid 1990s, the new environmental laws and civilian groups start complaining that there is negative impacts from the oil activity in Laguna del Tigre. Basic Resources tries to calm the protests by creating environmental and conscience projects, but it is unable to do so.

Finally, towards the late 1990s, Basic Resources was bought by the American company Union Pacific, and then sold again in 2001, for US$102,5 million to the private French society Perenco.

== See also ==
- Mundo Maya International Airport

== Notes and references ==
=== Bibliography ===
- Citation Resources (2013). "Guatemalan Oil Production and Exploration" (PDF). Oil Council. Perth, WA. Archived from the original (PDF) on 18 February 2015.
- Collectif (2011). "Perenco: explotar petróleo cueste lo que cueste" (PDF) (in Spanish). Guatemala: Une seule planète. Archived from the original (PDF) on February 18, 2015.
