= Champerico =

Coordinates: 14.293°N 91.914°W

- Municipality
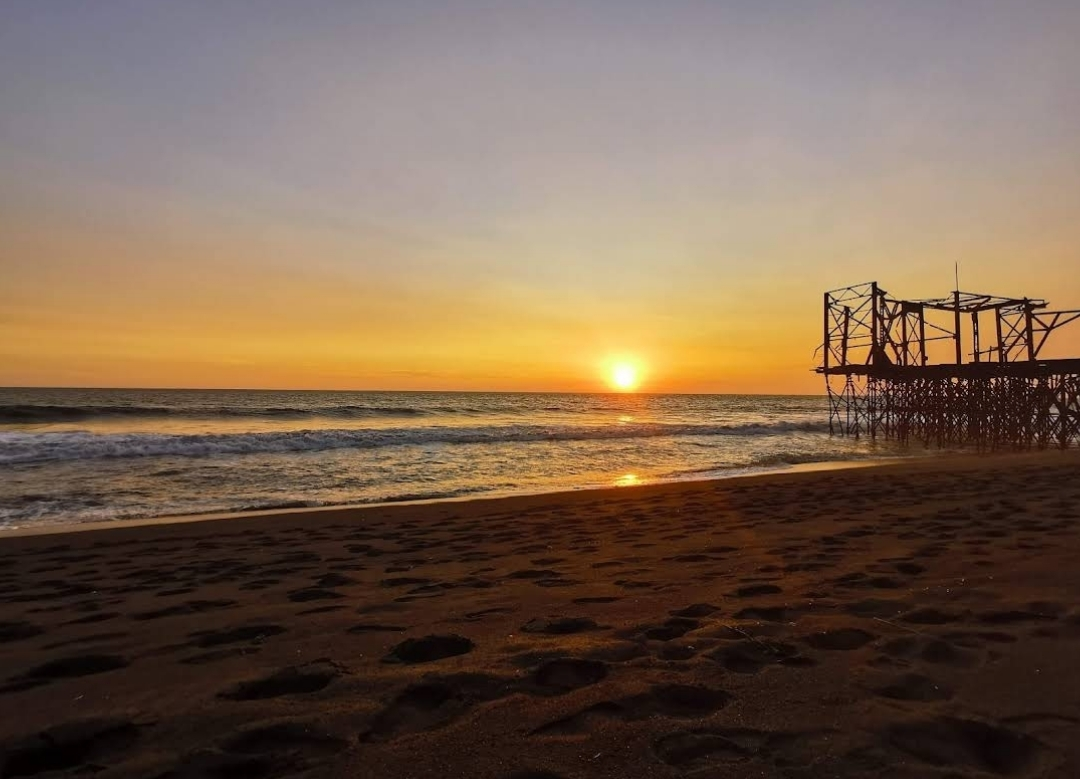

- Flag
- Interactive map of Champerico
- Country: Guatemala
- Department: Retalhuleu

Area
  - Municipality: 361 km^{2} (139 sq mi)

Population (2018 census)
  - Municipality: 32,815
  - Density: 90.9/km^{2} (235/sq mi)
  - Urban: 9,941

Champerico is a town and municipality in the Retalhuleu department in southwestern Guatemala. It is a popular vacation spot for Guatemalans in the region. The picturesque beach town was founded on the Pacific Ocean in 1872, and the paved road to Retalhuleu makes Champerico one of the most important ports on the Pacific. The port handles mostly coffee, timber and sugar. Its population in 2023 is 39,666.
