= Cuyotenango =

Coordinates: 14°32′N 91°34′W

- Municipality
- Interactive map of Cuyotenango
- Country: Guatemala
- Department: Suchitepéquez

Area
  - Municipality: 92.5 km^{2} (35.7 sq mi)

Population (2018 census)
  - Municipality: 33,436
  - Density: 361/km^{2} (936/sq mi)
  - Urban: 8,332

Cuyotenango is a town and municipality in the Suchitepéquez department of Guatemala. It has a population of 38,791.

Cuyotenango was founded around the 16th century, and its name in Nahuatl literally means "Fortification of the Coyote", a name given by the Mexican soldiers accompanying Pedro de Alvarado, the Spanish conquistador of Guatemala. There is a beach called Tulate, a vacation spot of Semana Santa (Holy Week).
