= Barillas =

Town in Navarre, Spain

Coordinates: 41°58′16″N 1°39′46″W

- Town
- Barillas, Navarre
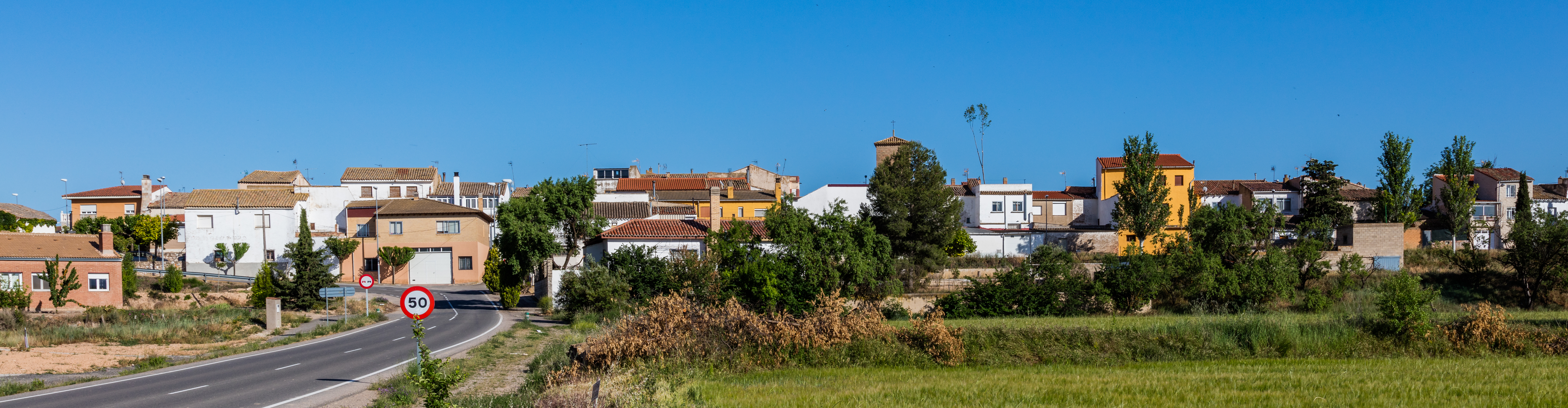
- Town of Barillas

- Coat of arms

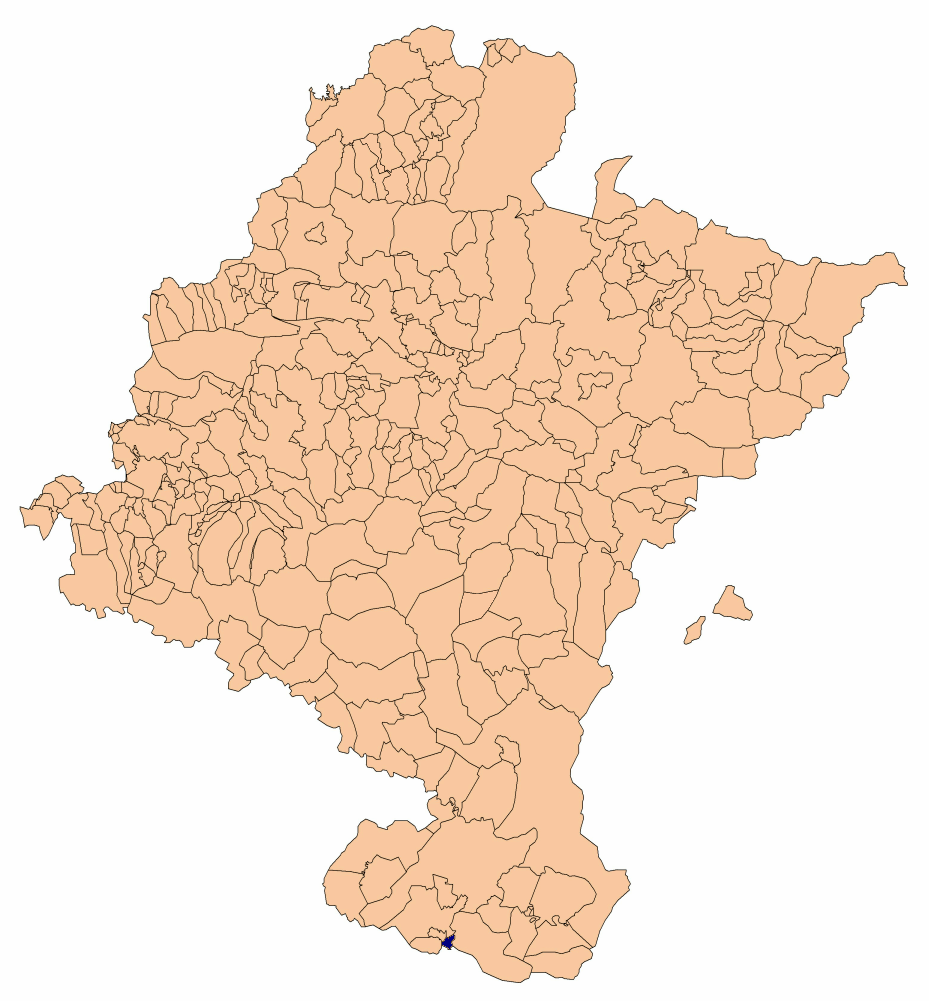
- Map of Barillas, Navarre
- Country: Spain
- Autonomous Community: Navarre
- Province: Navarre

Barillas is a town and municipality located in the province and autonomous community of Navarre, northern Spain.
