= San Andrés, Petén =

San Andrés
- Municipality
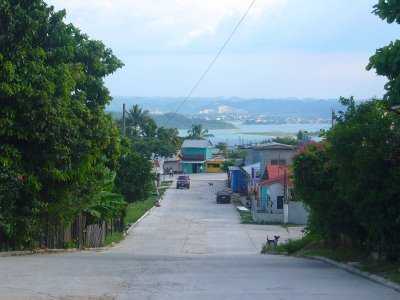

- Location in Guatemala
- Coordinates: 16°58′03″N 89°54′37″W
- Country: Guatemala
- Department: El Petén
- Municipality: San Andrés

Government
  - Type: Municipal
  - Mayor: Milton Méndez (PP)

Area
  - Municipality: 8,874 km^{2} (3,426 sq mi)
- Elevation: 150 m (490 ft)

Population (Census 2002)
  - Municipality: 20,295
  - Urban: 5,740
  - Ethnicities: Q’eqchi Ladino
  - Religions: Roman Catholicism Evangelicalism Maya
- Climate: Am

San Andrés is a municipality in the department of El Petén in Guatemala. The municipality is formed by the town of San Andrés, located on the north-western shore of Lake Petén Itzá, and 55 rural communities, with a total population of 20,295 people (census 2002).

The municipality was created in 1962 and has a territory 8,874 km^{2}, equivalent to 25% of the department of El Petén. In the 1990s, more than 93% (8,288 km^{2}) of the municipality's territory was declared protected nature reserve by the central government.
