= Santo Domingo Suchitepéquez =

Coordinates: 14°28′N 91°29′W

- Municipality
- Interactive map of Santo Domingo Suchitepéquez
- Country: Guatemala
- Department: Suchitepéquez

Area
  - Municipality: 336 km^{2} (130 sq mi)

Population (2018 census)
  - Municipality: 42,291
  - Density: 126/km^{2} (326/sq mi)
  - Urban: 7,578

Santo Domingo Suchitepéquez is a town and municipality in the Suchitepéquez Department of Guatemala.
