= Laguna de Calderas =

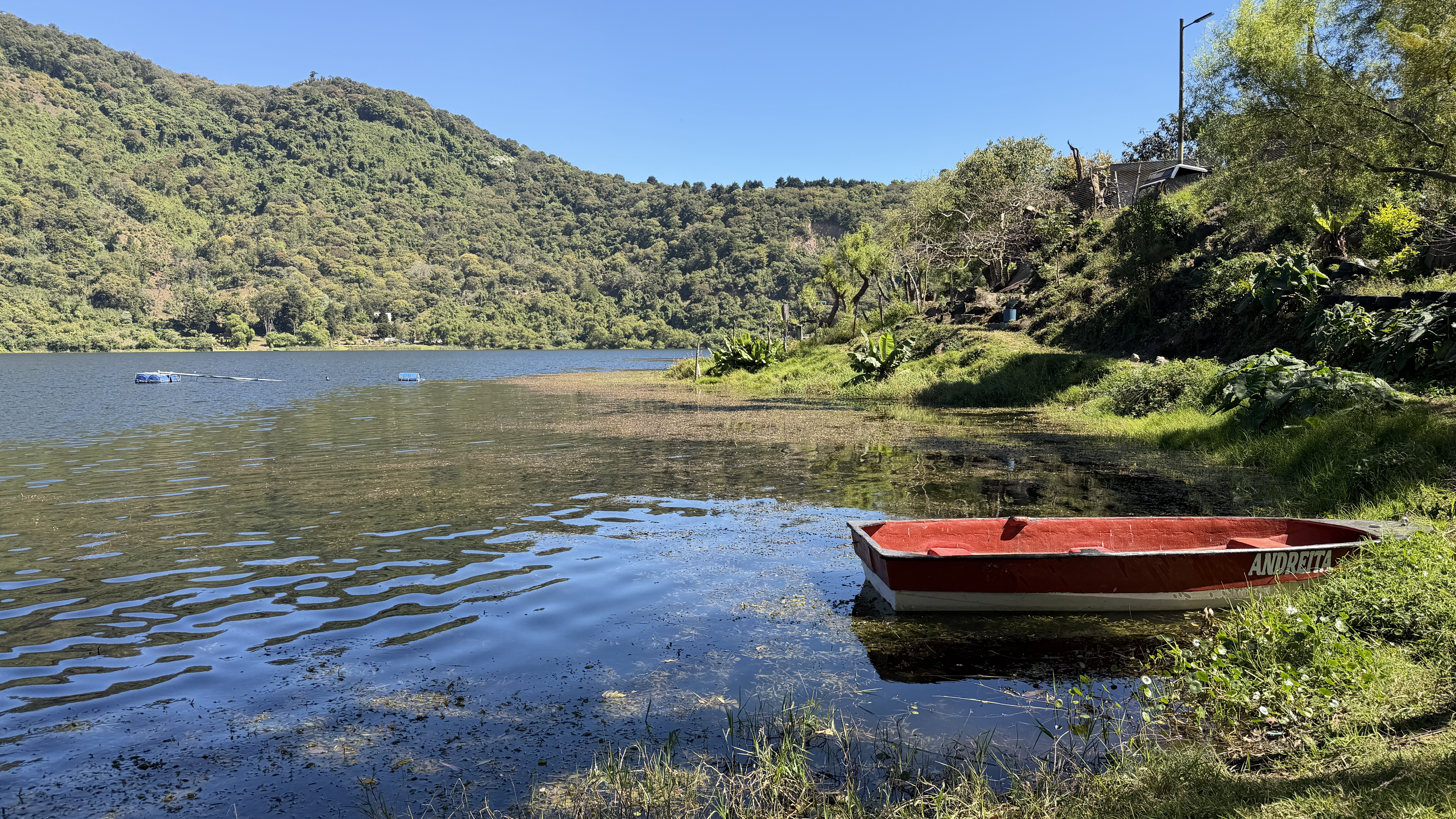

- Location within Guatemala
- Location: San Vicente Pacaya, Escuintla
- Coordinates: 14°24′40″N 90°35′25″W
- Lake type: Crater lake
- Basin countries: Guatemala
- Surface area: 0.11 km^{2} (0.042 sq mi)
- Surface elevation: 1,778 m (5,833 ft)

Laguna de Calderas is a crater lake in the municipality of Amatitlán, Guatemala, Guatemala. It is located approximately 6 km south of Lake Amatitlán and 3 km north of the currently active vent of the Pacaya volcano. The lake has a surface area of 11 ha and is situated at an altitude of 1778 m.
