= Xocomil =

Water park in Guatemala

Coordinates: 14.5984°N 91.6103°W

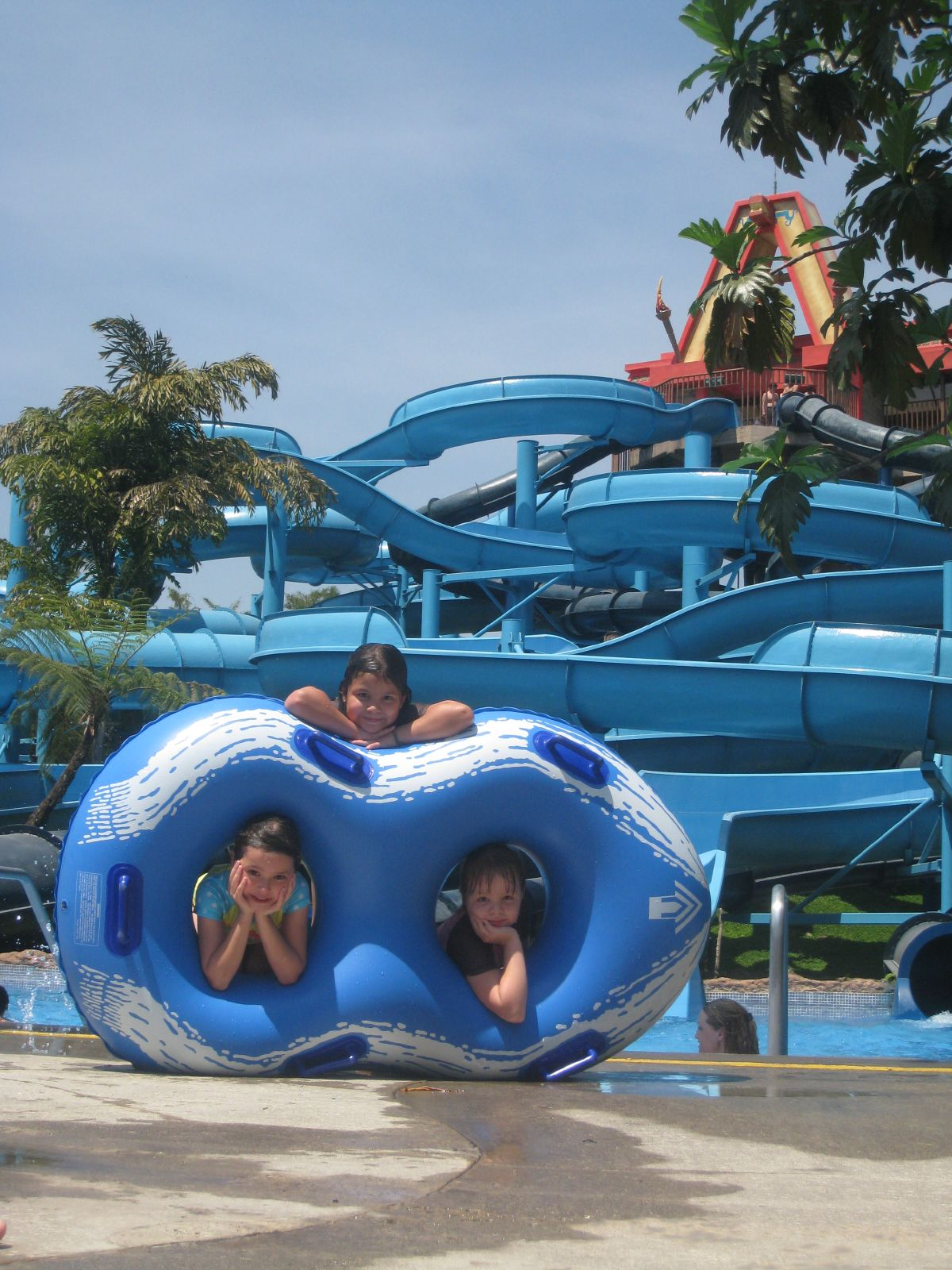
The "Nido de Serpientes".

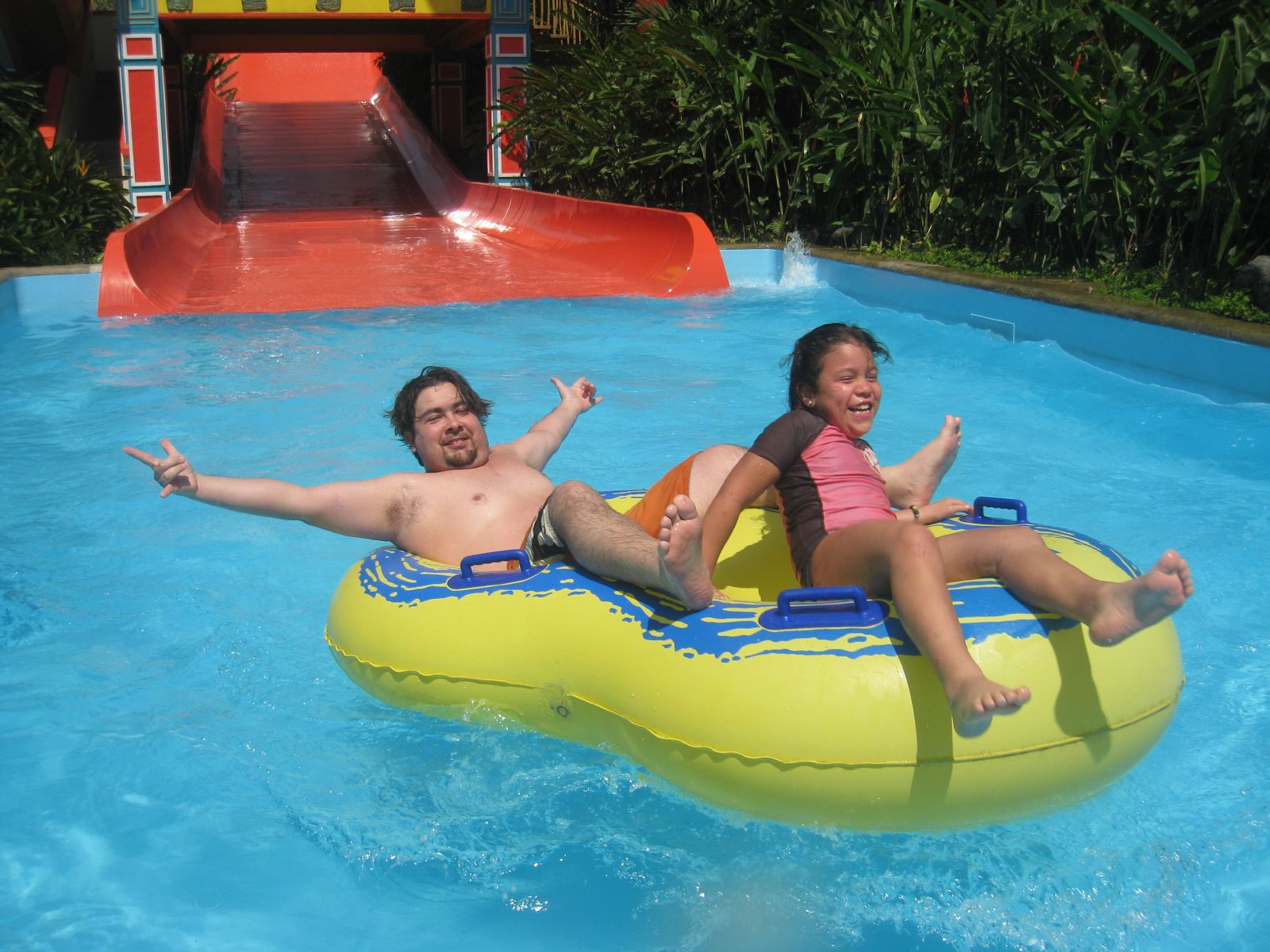

Xocomil is a water park in Guatemala. It is located in the Retalhuleu Department in the southwest of the country.

It is the largest and most-visited water park in the country. The park covers an area of 77,300 m^{3} and is themed to a Mayan pyramid.
