= El Asintal =

Coordinates: 14°36′N 91°44′W

El Asintal (Spanish pronunciation: [el asinˈtal]) is a town, with a population of 17,388 (2018 census), and a municipality in the Retalhuleu department of Guatemala. The municipality cover an area of 74 km^{2} with a population of 36,882 (2018 census).

The ruins of the Mesoamerican city of Takalik Abaj are within the municipality.
