= San Andrés Villa Seca =

Coordinates: 14°34′N 91°35′W

- Municipality
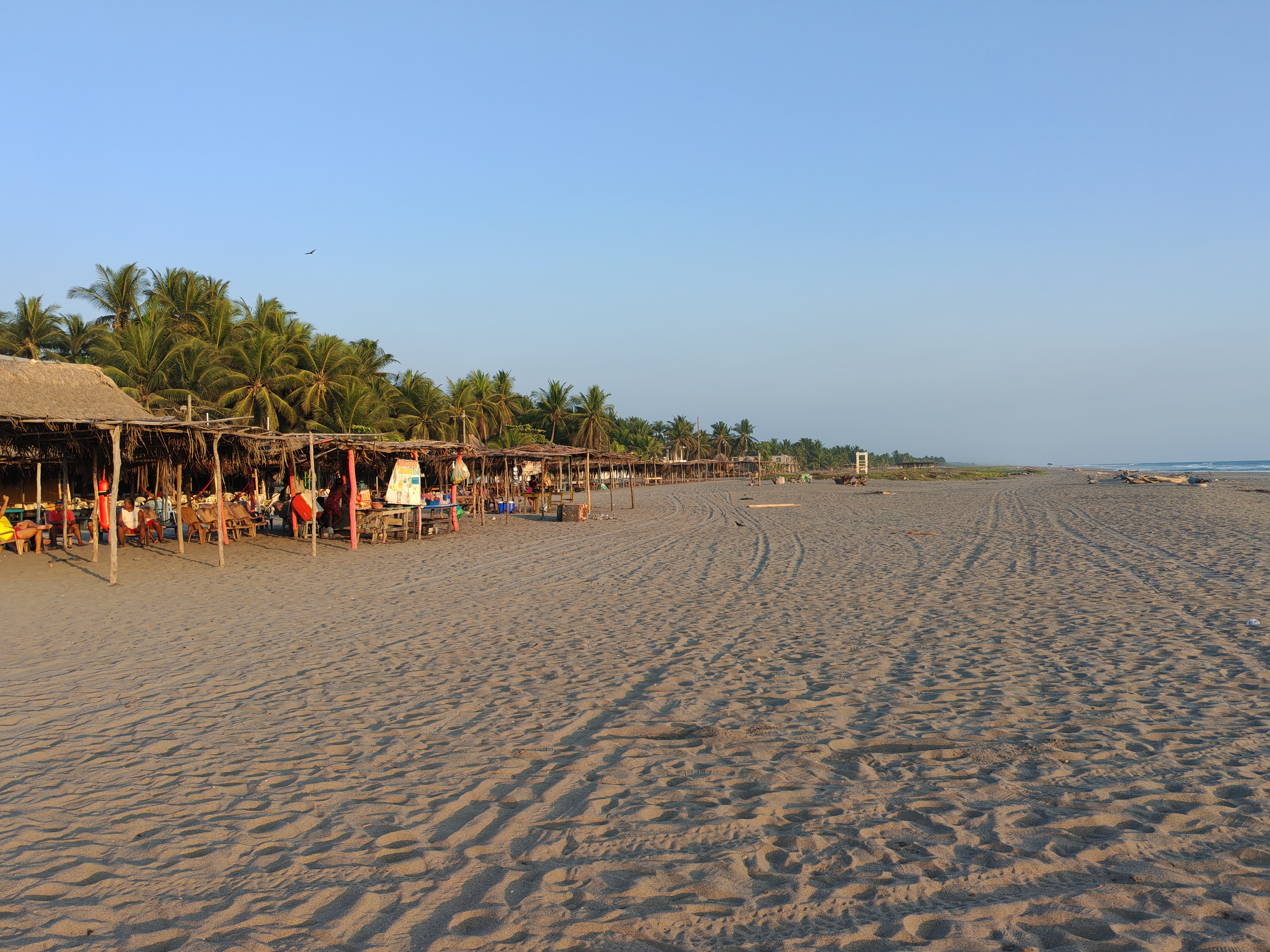
- Tulate Beach in San Andrés Villa Seca
- Interactive map of San Andrés Villa Seca
- Country: Guatemala
- Department: Retalhuleu

Area
  - Municipality: 451 km^{2} (174 sq mi)

Population (2018 census)
  - Municipality: 47,820
  - Density: 106/km^{2} (275/sq mi)
  - Urban: 11,763

San Andrés Villa Seca is a town and municipality in the Retalhuleu Department of Guatemala.
