= Retalhuleu Department =

Department of Guatemala

Coordinates: 14.5353°N 91.6783°W

Retalhuleu Department Departmento de Retalhuleu
- Department of Guatemala
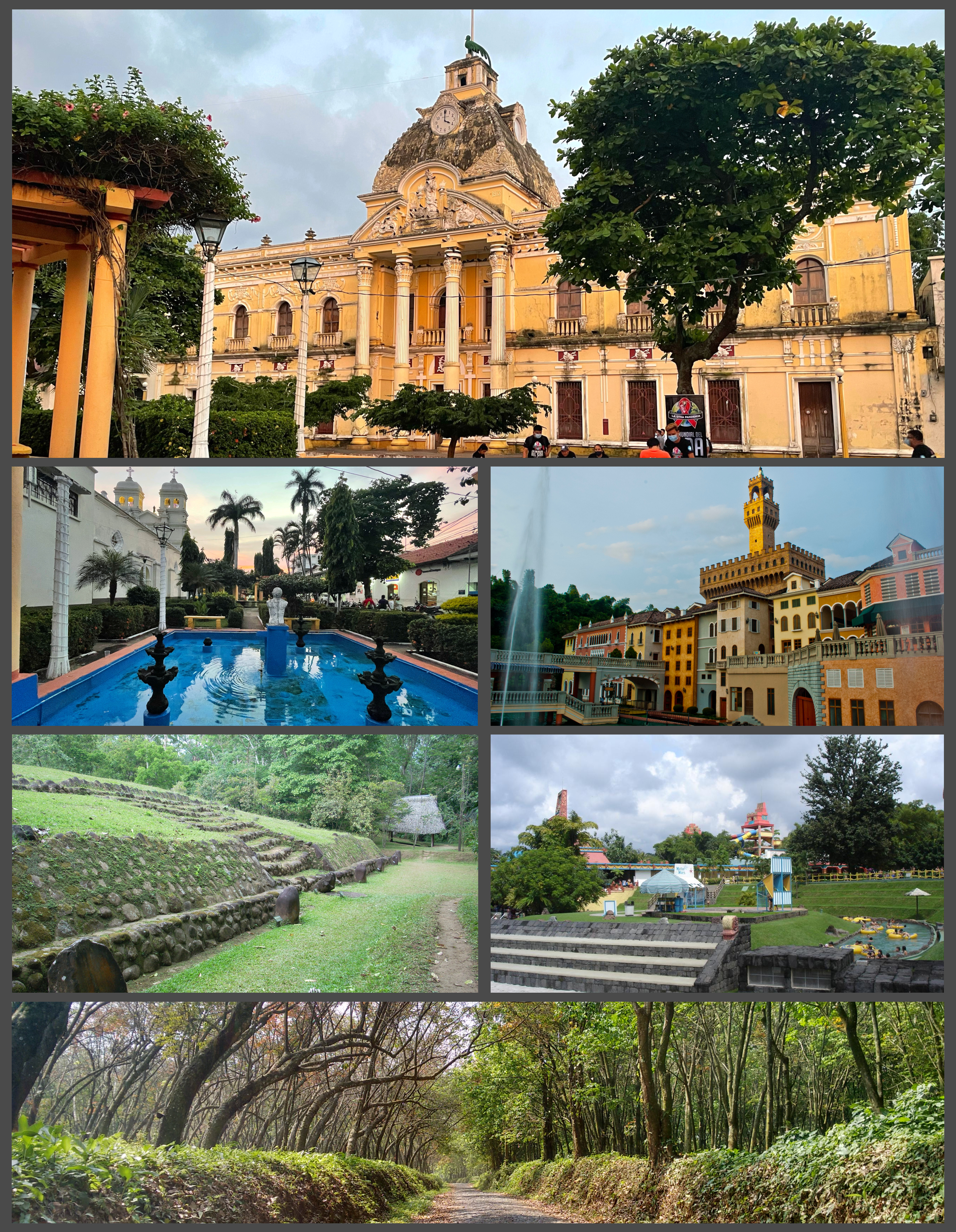
- Counterclockwise from top: Palacio Departamental Retalhuleu, Retalhuleu Central Park, Xetulul, Takalik Abaj, Xocomil & rubber farms

- Flag Coat of arms

- Retalhuleu
- Country: Guatemala
- Capital: Retalhuleu
- Municipalities: 9

Government
  - Type: Departmental

Area
  - Department of Guatemala: 1,856 km^{2} (717 sq mi)

Population (2018)
  - Department of Guatemala: 326,828
  - Density: 176.1/km^{2} (456.1/sq mi)
  - Urban: 187,401
  - Religions: Roman Catholicism Evangelicalism Maya
- Demonym: retalteco
- Time zone: UTC-6
- Website: gobernacionretalhuleu.gob.gt (in Spanish)

Retalhuleu (Spanish pronunciation: [re.ta.luˈlew], Retalhuléu) is a department located in the south-west of Guatemala, extending from the mountains to the Pacific Ocean coast. It has an area of 1856 km^{2}. In 2018, the population of the Department of Retalhuleu was 326,828. Its capital, Retalhuleu City, mixes ancient and modern architecture, and it is also known for being a commercial city.

The largest Native American group in the state is the K'iche' (Quiché) Maya people. The department contains a number of Pre-Columbian ruins, including Takalik Abaj, and it also contains numerous amusement parks, the most important and known are Xetulul and Xocomil.

== Municipalities ==
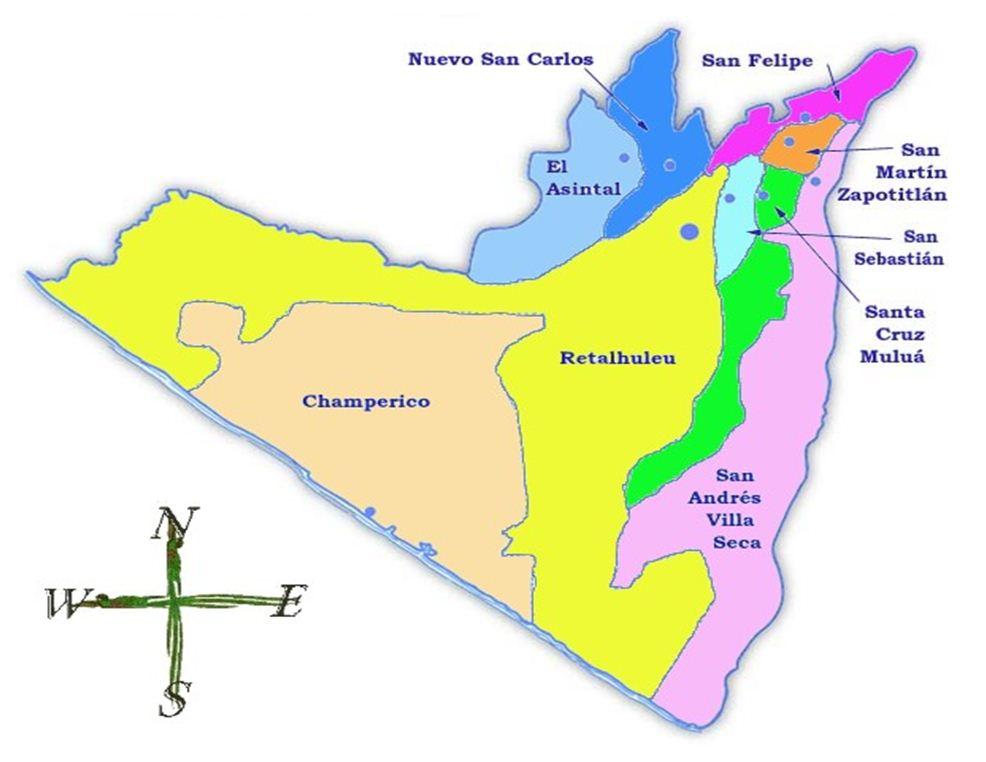
Map of the Municipalities of Retalhuleu

The department is divided into nine municipalities:

1. Champerico
2. El Asintal
3. Nuevo San Carlos
4. Retalhuleu
5. San Andrés Villa Seca
6. San Felipe
7. San Martín Zapotitlán
8. San Sebastián
9. Santa Cruz Muluá

== Geography ==
Tropical savanna climates have monthly mean temperature above 18 °C (64 °F) in every month of the year and typically a pronounced dry season, with the driest month having precipitation less than 60mm (2.36 in) of precipitation. The Köppen Climate Classification subtype for this climate is "Aw". (Tropical Savanna Climate).

=== Climate ===
Climate data for Retalhuleu
Month	Jan	Feb	Mar	Apr	May	Jun	Jul	Aug	Sep	Oct	Nov	Dec	Year
Mean daily maximum °C (°F)	31 (87)	31 (87)	31 (88)	32 (89)	30 (86)	30 (86)	29 (85)	30 (86)	29 (85)	29 (85)	31 (87)	31 (87)	31 (87)
Mean daily minimum °C (°F)	24 (75)	24 (76)	26 (78)	26 (78)	25 (77)	25 (77)	25 (77)	24 (76)	24 (75)	24 (76)	24 (76)	24 (76)	24 (76)
Average precipitation cm (inches)	5.1 (2)	2.5 (1)	5.1 (2)	7.6 (3)	20 (8)	36 (14)	38 (15)	36 (14)	46 (18)	36 (14)	15 (6)	5.1 (2)	250 (99)
Source: Weatherbase

== Languages ==
The official language of Retalhuleu is Spanish, but the indigenous languages of K’iche’ and Mam are still spoken in the municipalities of San Felipe Retalhuleu, San Martín Zapotitlán, San Sebastián and Champerico.
