= Retalhuleu =

- Municipality and city
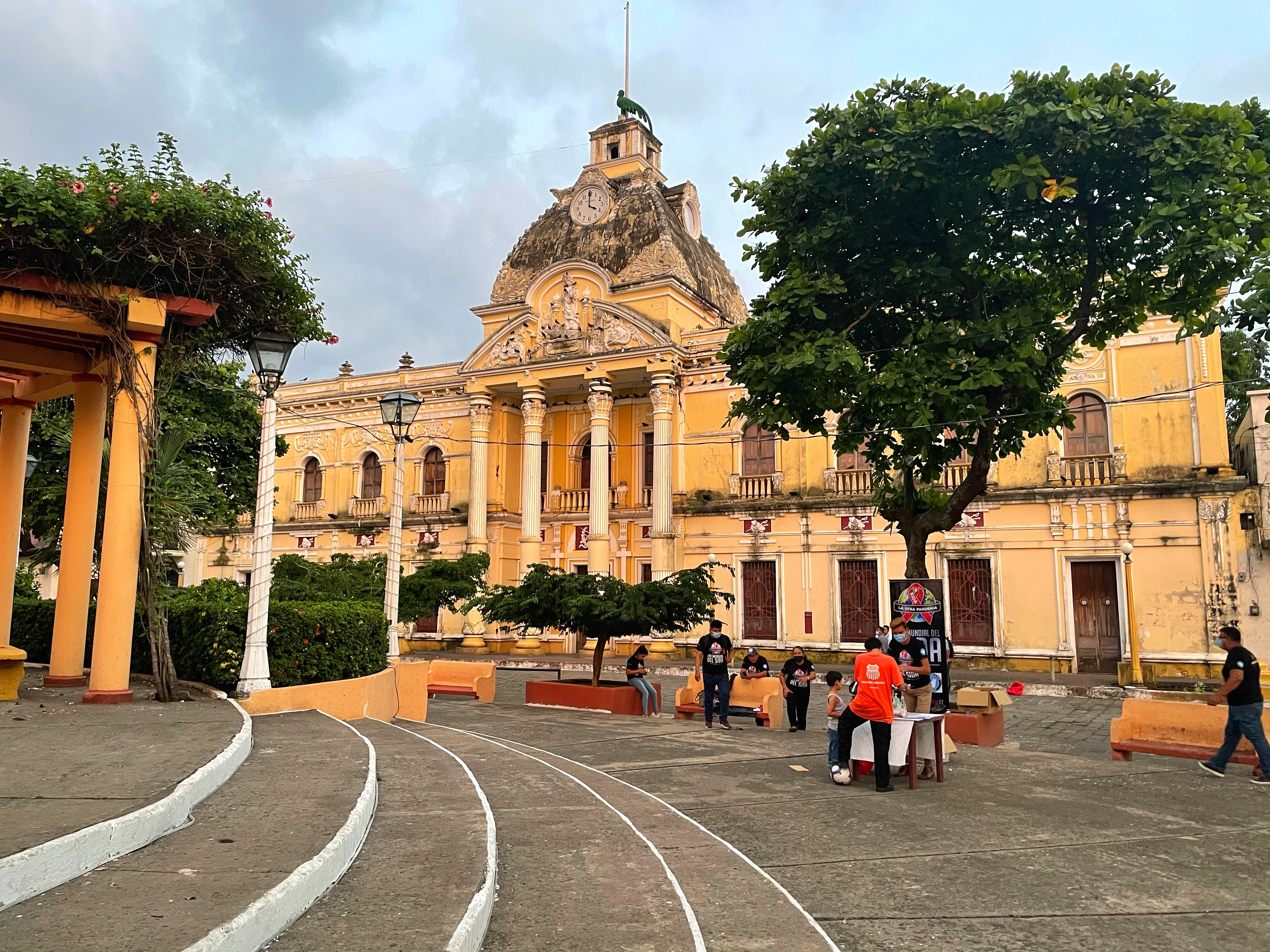
- Departmental palace

- Location in Guatemala
- Coordinates: 14°32′N 91°41′W
- Country: Guatemala
- Department: Retalhuleu

Area
  - Municipality and city: 791 km^{2} (305 sq mi)
- Elevation: 232 m (761 ft)

Population (2018 census)
  - Municipality and city: 90,505
  - Density: 114/km^{2} (296/sq mi)
  - Urban: 90,505
- Climate: Am
- Website: munireu.gob.gt

Retalhuleu (Spanish pronunciation: [re.ta.luˈlew]) is a city in south-western Guatemala, about 55 kilometres (34 mi) by road southwest of Quetzaltenango. It is the departmental seat of Retalhuleu Department as well as the municipal seat of Retalhuleu Municipality. Locally it is nicknamed "Reu."

The city had a population of 90,505 at the time of the 2018 census.

== History ==
Retalhuleu was established in 1877. The city played a role in the Bay of Pigs Invasion. For a number of recruits, infantry training was carried out at a CIA-run base code-named JMTrax. The base was on the Pacific coast of Guatemala between Quetzaltenango and Retalhuleu, in the Helvetia coffee plantation. In summer 1960, an airfield (code-named JMadd, aka Rayo Base) was constructed near Retalhuleu, Guatemala. In November 1960, the Retalhuleu recruits also took part in quelling an officers' rebellion in Guatemala, in addition to the intervention of the U.S. Navy.

On August 7 and 8, 2021, Retalhuleu was severely affected by rain, which lasted for 36 hours and caused landslides, floods and other damages to Retalhuleu and other Guatemalan cities.

== Geography and climate ==
Retalhuleu lies in south-western Guatemala, approximately 55 kilometres (34 mi) by road southwest of Quetzaltenango, 27 kilometres (17 mi) west of Mazatenango and about 37 kilometres (23 mi) northeast of the coastal town of Champerico along Route 95.

Retalhuleu has a tropical monsoon climate (Köppen: Am) with a very rainy wet season from April to November, and a dry season from December to March.

Climate data for Retalhuleu (1991–2020)
| Month | Jan | Feb | Mar | Apr | May | Jun | Jul | Aug | Sep | Oct | Nov | Dec | Year |
|---|---|---|---|---|---|---|---|---|---|---|---|---|---|
| Record high °C (°F) | 35.8 (96.4) | 37.4 (99.3) | 36.6 (97.9) | 38.0 (100.4) | 37.0 (98.6) | 35.6 (96.1) | 35.8 (96.4) | 36.0 (96.8) | 35.0 (95.0) | 34.3 (93.7) | 36.4 (97.5) | 35.0 (95.0) | 38.0 (100.4) |
| Mean daily maximum °C (°F) | 33.3 (91.9) | 33.5 (92.3) | 33.8 (92.8) | 34.0 (93.2) | 33.2 (91.8) | 32.5 (90.5) | 32.8 (91.0) | 32.9 (91.2) | 32.5 (90.5) | 32.3 (90.1) | 32.8 (91.0) | 33.2 (91.8) | 33.1 (91.6) |
| Daily mean °C (°F) | 27.1 (80.8) | 27.7 (81.9) | 28.3 (82.9) | 28.7 (83.7) | 28.0 (82.4) | 27.2 (81.0) | 27.3 (81.1) | 27.3 (81.1) | 26.6 (79.9) | 26.6 (79.9) | 27.0 (80.6) | 27.0 (80.6) | 27.4 (81.3) |
| Mean daily minimum °C (°F) | 20.7 (69.3) | 21.0 (69.8) | 21.6 (70.9) | 22.4 (72.3) | 22.5 (72.5) | 22.3 (72.1) | 22.0 (71.6) | 22.1 (71.8) | 22.0 (71.6) | 21.9 (71.4) | 21.5 (70.7) | 21.0 (69.8) | 21.8 (71.2) |
| Record low °C (°F) | 18.0 (64.4) | 18.3 (64.9) | 18.0 (64.4) | 19.9 (67.8) | 19.6 (67.3) | 20.0 (68.0) | 19.0 (66.2) | 18.5 (65.3) | 20.4 (68.7) | 19.6 (67.3) | 18.9 (66.0) | 17.7 (63.9) | 17.7 (63.9) |
| Average rainfall mm (inches) | 11.4 (0.45) | 11.0 (0.43) | 38.8 (1.53) | 143.0 (5.63) | 452.6 (17.82) | 476.4 (18.76) | 343.5 (13.52) | 395.9 (15.59) | 527.0 (20.75) | 503.3 (19.81) | 144.4 (5.69) | 37.9 (1.49) | 3,085.2 (121.46) |
| Average rainy days (≥ 1.0 mm) | 1.2 | 1.1 | 3.4 | 8.4 | 18.8 | 20.1 | 19.3 | 20.0 | 22.9 | 20.8 | 8.1 | 2.2 | 146.3 |
Source: NOAA

== Sports ==
The local football club is Deportivo Reu which was founded in 2013 after Juventud Retalteca became defunct.< Deportivo Reu play their local games at the Estadio Dr. Óscar Monterroso Izaguirre in the Primera División de Ascenso.
