= San Miguel Ixtahuacán =

- Municipality of Guatemala
- Nickname: San Miguel Ixt.
- Location in Guatemala
- Coordinates: 15°15′00″N 91°45′00″W
- Country: Guatemala
- Department: San Marcos

Government
  - Mayor: René Soto (CREO-Unionista)

Population
  - Total: 35.210
- Climate: Cwb

San Miguel Ixtahuacán is a municipality in the San Marcos department of Guatemala. It comprises 19 villages, and the population is about 39,000 people. The majority of people are ethnically Maya- Mam and speak the Mam and Spanish languages. Most inhabitants subsist by farming, growing crops of corn, beans, vegetables and fruits, irrigated from the Cuilco River and its tributaries.

== History ==
=== Spanish colony ===
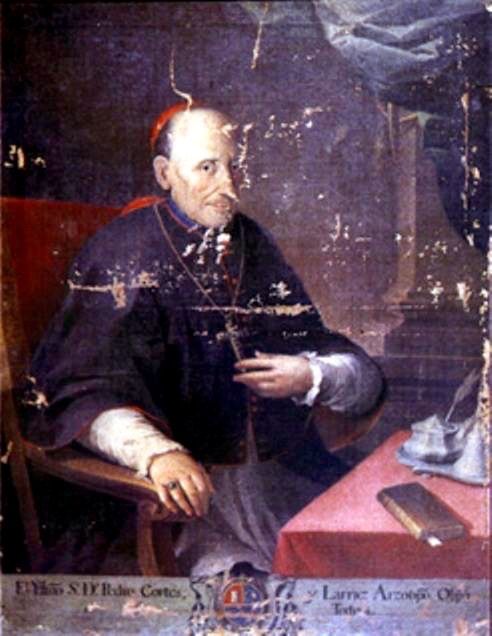
Bishop Pedro Cortés y Larraz portrait; he arrived to Tejutla in 1770.

In 1690, Tejutla had a large area and included the modern municipalities of Comitancillo, Ixchiguán, Concepción Tutuapa, Sipacapa, Sibinal, Tajumulco, Tacaná and part of what is now San Miguel Ixtahuacán. According to the historical writings from Recordación Florida of Francisco Antonio de Fuentes y Guzmán, Tejutla belonged to Quetzaltenango Department and it was a "prosperous land with rich weathers and comfortable forest with enough water".

Tejutla was an important commercial and religious center; in August 1767, Joseph Domingo Hidalgo described Santiago Tejutla as "El Curato" -i.e., the focal center of commerce of all the towns that were around it− in the Gaceta de Guatemala, the official newspaper of the times. Then, in the last quarter of the 18th century, bishop Dr. Pedro Cortés y Larraz, who arrived from Cuilco in 1770 as part of the inspection he was doing of the Guatemalan dioceses, called Tejutla "Santiago en la Cima del Monte" (English: Santiago at the top of the hill" and reported that there were "sixty four families who lived very well" in the area.

=== After independence from Spain ===
The Central American United Provinces constitution from 11 October 1821, showed Tejutla under modern San Marcos jurisdiction for the very first time.

In 1870 Tejutla reached "Villa" category and, due to its development, its authorities requested to the House of Representatives of Guatemala to be named a Department capital. The department was going to have the municipalities mentioned above, along with the modern municipalities of Cuilco, Santa Bárbara and San Gaspar, Huehuetenango, from the modern Huehuetenango Department. Besides, in those days, Motocintla, Cacahuatán and Tapachula—which would go definitively to Mexico in 1892 due to the Herrera-Mariscal treaty— were under the jurisdiction of the Mercedarian convent located in Tejutla. Furthermore, Tejutla even had House representatives of its own in those days.

But power shifted when the conservatives led by Field Marshal Vicente Cerna were defeated by the liberal forces of generals Miguel Garcia Granados and Justo Rufino Barrios −who was a San Lorenzo native; once the liberals were in power, the expelled the regular clergy from Guatemala leaving Tejutla without their main administrative and leadership support, the Mercedarians. In fact, Barrios government confiscated monasteries, large extensions of farm land, sugar mills and Indian doctrines from the Mercedarians and other regular orders and then distributed it to his liberal friend and comrades, who became large landowners in the area.

=== 21st century: Gold extraction ===
In 2004, Goldcorp, a Canadian- owned mining corporation based in Vancouver, British Columbia, began construction of Marlin Mine. Marlin Mine is a gold and silver mine located on the border between San Miguel Ixtahuacán and the neighboring municipality of Sipacapa. Approximately 80% of the mine is located in San Miguel Ixtahuacán. There has been controversy over Marlin Mine, owing to accusations by some community members that they were not properly consulted prior to the construction of the mine, as required by national Guatemalan law and international law. There has been ongoing violence in San Miguel Ixtahuacán, both against mining property and against mining opposition.

In a 2009 press conference, the Catholic Diocese of the department of San Marcos presented the results of a two-year study they carried out of the quality of surface waters surrounding Marlin Mine. The press conference was held in Guatemala City, and was attended by environmental activists, human rights activists, mining personnel, and members of the public. The study found that surface water used by community members in San Miguel Ixtahuacán for crop irrigation, herd animals, and human consumption, has been contaminated by heavy metals such as arsenic and copper. The levels of these heavy metals exceed Guatemalan standards, international World Health Organization standards, and standards set by the United States Environmental Protection Agency for drinking water. The study explained the specific steps taken to test the water, and has been published online in Spanish, and in English. However, the study did not compare its findings to historical metals levels in the rivers, which were shown in the baseline study to have naturally high metals levels, which exceeded guidelines for certain uses, including drinking water, prior to the existence of the mining operation.

Officials from Goldcorp and from the Guatemalan Ministry of Natural Resources and Environment (MARN) who attended the press conference accused the Catholic Diocese of using flawed methods that are unscientific. They have posted videos on YouTube, in Spanish, demonstrating the strategies they use to test surface waters. The results of the MARN tests have not been released to the public, but Goldcorp reports their monitoring annually on their website.

A subsequent 2010 study carried out under the initiative of the Diocese reported that, with the exception of aluminum content in one sample, samples of river water were all within "US Benchmarks"; and that all drinking water sampled had metals content below limits set in the US EPA's National Drinking Water Regulations. This study, and the ongoing environmental monitoring are described in more detail in the article on the Marlin Mine.

== Communities ==
The municipality has nineteen villages and forty settlements. The villages with their respective settlements are:

Villages and settlements
| Village | Settlements |
|---|---|
| Cabajchún | Numaltzé, Suanal, Yzalá. |
| Colmito | Cancela, Mulebac, Saquilá, Xanboch. |
| Chilive | Sakchilon, Twi' Kyaqja, Ttzijul Los Domingos, Sakmuj, Ixcail |
| La Estancia | El Paraíso |
| El Pueblo | N/A |
| El Zapote | Canchilub, Exnú, Matasano, Sija, Tuiloj, Uyumán, Chimob, Jovenche, Plomdigas, Tuichul, Tuiventana, Xecanlelj. |
| La Patria | La Vega, Llano Grande, Recreo, Tuichun, Tuilov, Tzale, Tzuga. |
| Máquivil | Chajnoj, Chanjul, Ixtuc, Ixcuc, Joya Verde, La Hamaca, Pox, Quiacnoj. |
| Salitre | Chiquilila, Chuena, Tijasnic, Tuicanxac, Tuiné, Tuisieteplatos. |
| Sicabe | Alquinque, Chunay, Ixpuna, La Laguna, Parmedero, Quiaccol, Tujequiej. |
| Subchal | Catzaja, Huiton, Ixknub'e, Michel Xalcana, Chaclinan, Ipitol, La Escoba Pavillé. |
| Triunfo | Chojola, Inxungüel, Ladrillera, Tuisaca, Intuijoj, Impulmadera, Tuintipox, Tuiscab. |
| Baljetre | N/A |
| Ixpuna | N/A |
| La cumbre | N/A |
| Agel | N/A |
| La Florida | N/A |

It also has the following open fields: Alen, Chumaj, Estancia, Jolvoch, Moxman, Síchvil, Chumay, Exnubé, Lámaca, Sacumuj, Sugual, Bramadero, Chumbel, Ixmuchipeque, Las Escobas, Sacabjlé, Tanán, Campana, El Pito, Limoná, Saquilá, Tujxux, Cancelá, El Potrero, Jatzmap, Maniajá, Satla, Tzalé, Chililá, y El Recreo.

== Climate ==
San Miguel Ixtahuacán has template climate (Köppen: Cwb).

Climate data for San Miguel Ixtahuacán
| Month | Jan | Feb | Mar | Apr | May | Jun | Jul | Aug | Sep | Oct | Nov | Dec | Year |
|---|---|---|---|---|---|---|---|---|---|---|---|---|---|
| Mean daily maximum °C (°F) | 21.4 (70.5) | 22.2 (72.0) | 24.0 (75.2) | 24.6 (76.3) | 24.0 (75.2) | 22.7 (72.9) | 22.5 (72.5) | 23.0 (73.4) | 22.5 (72.5) | 21.8 (71.2) | 21.8 (71.2) | 21.4 (70.5) | 22.7 (72.8) |
| Daily mean °C (°F) | 14.3 (57.7) | 14.7 (58.5) | 16.4 (61.5) | 17.4 (63.3) | 17.8 (64.0) | 17.3 (63.1) | 16.9 (62.4) | 16.9 (62.4) | 17.0 (62.6) | 16.3 (61.3) | 15.4 (59.7) | 14.7 (58.5) | 16.3 (61.3) |
| Mean daily minimum °C (°F) | 7.2 (45.0) | 7.3 (45.1) | 8.9 (48.0) | 10.3 (50.5) | 11.6 (52.9) | 12.0 (53.6) | 11.4 (52.5) | 10.9 (51.6) | 11.5 (52.7) | 10.9 (51.6) | 9.1 (48.4) | 8.0 (46.4) | 9.9 (49.9) |
| Average precipitation mm (inches) | 8 (0.3) | 8 (0.3) | 25 (1.0) | 61 (2.4) | 147 (5.8) | 269 (10.6) | 184 (7.2) | 186 (7.3) | 247 (9.7) | 173 (6.8) | 33 (1.3) | 11 (0.4) | 1,352 (53.1) |
Source: Climate-Data.org

== See also ==
- La Aurora International Airport
- Tapachula International Airport

== Notes and references ==
=== Bibliography ===
- Cortés y Larraz, Pedro (1770). Descripción Geográfico-Moral de la Diócesis de Goathemala (in Spanish). Guatemala: Diócesis de Guatemala.
- Fuentes y Guzmán, Francisco Antonio de (1932) [1690]. Recordación Florida. Discurso historial y demostración natural, material, militar y política del Reyno de Guatemala. Biblioteca Goathemala de la Sociedad de Geografía e Historia Volumen VI (in Spanish). Vol. I–III. Guatemala: Tipografía Nacional.
