= Sibinal =

- Location in Guatemala
- Coordinates: 15°08′03″N 92°03′00″W
- County: Guatemala
- Department: San Marcos

Government
  - Mayor: Amílcar Robles Escalante (UNE)

Population (2018)
  - Total: 17,000
- Climate: Cwb

Sibinal is a municipality in the San Marcos department of Guatemala. Its name comes from mam tziben (English: "Writing" and nal (English: Bernard), meaning "Bernard writings" It was founded in February 1799. It is a mountainous municipality at an altitude about 2500 m near the Mexican-Guatemalan border. The village of Sibinal is one of the points for climbing towards the Volcano Tacaná.

== History ==
=== Spanish colony ===
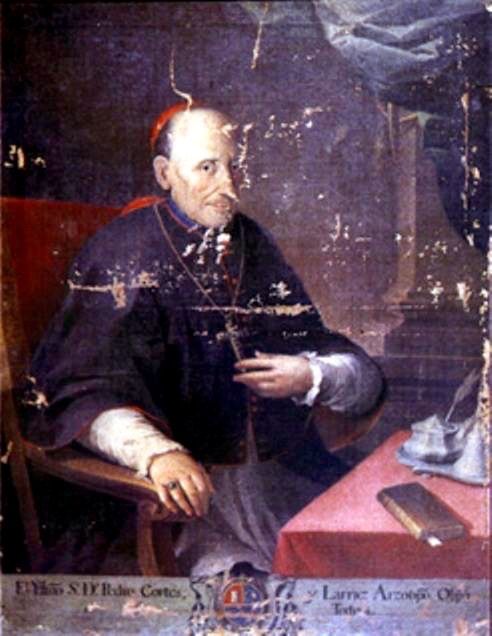
Bishop Pedro Cortés y Larraz portrait; he arrived to Tejutla in 1770.

In 1690, Tejutla had a large area and included the modern municipalities of Comitancillo, Ixchiguán, Concepción Tutuapa, Sipacapa, Sibinal, Tajumulco, Tacaná and part of what is now San Miguel Ixtahuacán. According to the historical writings from Recordación Florida of Francisco Antonio de Fuentes y Guzmán, Tejutla belonged to Quetzaltenango Department and it was a "prosperous land with rich weathers and comfortable forest with enough water".

Tejutla was an important commercial and religious center; in August 1767, Joseph Domingo Hidalgo described Santiago Tejutla as "El Curato" -i.e., the focal center of commerce of all the towns that were around it− in the Gaceta de Guatemala, the official newspaper of the times. Then, in the last quarter of the 18th century, bishop Dr. Pedro Cortés y Larraz, who arrived from Cuilco in 1770 as part of the inspection he was doing of the Guatemalan dioceses, called Tejutla "Santiago en la Cima del Monte" (English: Santiago at the top of the hill" and reported that there were "sixty four families who lived very well" in the area. In February 1799, Sibinal was founded as a settlement.

=== After independence from Spain ===
The Central American United Provinces constitution from 11 October 1821, showed Tejutla under modern San Marcos jurisdiction for the very first time.

In 1870 Tejutla reached "Villa" category and, due to its development, its authorities requested to the House of Representatives of Guatemala to be named a Department capital. The department was going to have the municipalities mentioned above, along with the modern municipalities of Cuilco, Santa Bárbara and San Gaspar, Huehuetenango, from the modern Huehuetenango Department. Besides, in those days, Motocintla, Cacahuatán and Tapachula—which would go definitively to Mexico in 1892 due to the Herrera-Mariscal treaty— were under the jurisdiction of the secular convent located in Tejutla. Furthermore, Tejutla even had House representatives of its own in those days.

But power shifted when the conservatives led by Field Marshal Vicente Cerna were defeated by the liberal forces of generals Miguel Garcia Granados and Justo Rufino Barrios −who was a San Lorenzo native; once the liberals were in power, they expelled the regular clergy from Guatemala and abolished mandatory tithing for the secular clergy, thus leaving Tejutla without their main administrative and leadership support, the "curato". In fact, Barrios government confiscated monasteries, large extensions of farm land, sugar mills and Indian doctrines from the regular orders and then distributed it to his liberal friend and comrades, who became large landowners in the area.

== Climate ==
Sibinal has temperate climate (Köppen: Cwb).

Climate data for Sibinal
Month	Jan	Feb	Mar	Apr	May	Jun	Jul	Aug	Sep	Oct	Nov	Dec	Year
Mean daily maximum °C (°F)	18.7 (65.7)	19.0 (66.2)	20.5 (68.9)	21.0 (69.8)	20.7 (69.3)	19.7 (67.5)	19.8 (67.6)	20.2 (68.4)	19.6 (67.3)	19.1 (66.4)	19.2 (66.6)	18.9 (66.0)	19.7 (67.5)
Daily mean °C (°F)	11.3 (52.3)	11.4 (52.5)	12.9 (55.2)	13.9 (57.0)	14.8 (58.6)	14.6 (58.3)	14.6 (58.3)	14.4 (57.9)	14.4 (57.9)	13.8 (56.8)	12.8 (55.0)	12.0 (53.6)	13.4 (56.1)
Mean daily minimum °C (°F)	3.9 (39.0)	3.9 (39.0)	5.3 (41.5)	6.9 (44.4)	8.9 (48.0)	9.6 (49.3)	9.4 (48.9)	8.7 (47.7)	9.3 (48.7)	8.6 (47.5)	6.4 (43.5)	5.2 (41.4)	7.2 (44.9)
Average precipitation mm (inches)	6 (0.2)	6 (0.2)	26 (1.0)	68 (2.7)	187 (7.4)	284 (11.2)	211 (8.3)	239 (9.4)	276 (10.9)	187 (7.4)	26 (1.0)	13 (0.5)	1,529 (60.2)
Source: Climate-Data.org

== Geographic location ==
It is 75 km west of San Marcos and 317 km west of Guatemala City. It is surrounded by San Marcos Department municipalities and borders Mexico.

== See also ==
- La Aurora International Airport
- Tapachula International Airport

== Notes and references ==
=== Bibliography ===
- Cortés y Larraz, Pedro (1770). Descripción Geográfico-Moral de la Diócesis de Goathemala (in Spanish). Guatemala: Diócesis de Guatemala.
- Duarte Godínez, Boris Gustavo (2010). Municipio de Comitancillo: Diagnóstico administrativo municipal (PDF). Ejercicio Profesional Supervisado (in Spanish). Guatemala: Facultad de Ciencias Económicas, Universidad de San Carlos de Guatemala.
- Fuentes y Guzmán, Francisco Antonio de (1932) [1690]. Recordación Florida. Discurso historial y demostración natural, material, militar y política del Reyno de Guatemala. Biblioteca Goathemala de la Sociedad de Geografía e Historia Volumen VI (in Spanish). Vol. I–III. Guatemala: Tipografía Nacional.
