= Sipacapa =

Sipacapa San Bartolomé Sipacapa
- Municipality of Guatemala
- Location in Guatemala
- Coordinates: 15°12′44″N 91°38′05″W
- Country: Guatemala
- Department: San Marcos
- Municipality: Sipacapa

Government
  - Type: Municipal
  - Mayor (2016-2020): Carlos Domingo (LIDER)

Population (Census 2002)
  - Municipality of Guatemala: 14,043
  - Urban: 623
  - Ethnicities: Sipakapense Ladino
  - Religions: Roman Catholicism Evangelicalism Maya
- Climate: Cwb

Sipacapa is a municipality in the San Marcos department, situated in the Western highlands of Guatemala. Sipacapa's population of around 14,000 is spread among 14 village communities, scattered over mountainous terrain. Sipacapa is considered a linguistic community, as Sipakapense is a Maya language unique to the municipality.

== History ==
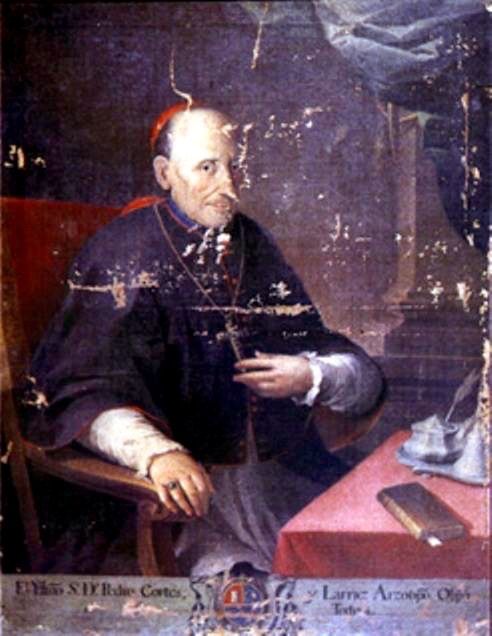
Bishop Pedro Cortés y Larraz portrait; he arrived to Tejutla in 1770.

In 1690, Tejutla had a large area and included the modern municipalities of Comitancillo, Ixchiguán, Concepción Tutuapa, Sipacapa, Sibinal, Tajumulco, Tacaná and part of what is now San Miguel Ixtahuacán. According to the historical writings from Recordación Florida of Francisco Antonio de Fuentes y Guzmán, Tejutla belonged to Quetzaltenango Department and it was a "prosperous land with rich weathers and comfortable forest with enough water".

Tejutla was an important commercial and religious center; in August 1767, Joseph Domingo Hidalgo described Santiago Tejutla as "El Curato" -i.e., the focal center of commerce of all the towns that were around it− in the Gaceta de Guatemala, the official newspaper of the times. Then, in the last quarter of the 18th century, bishop Dr. Pedro Cortés y Larraz, who arrived from Cuilco in 1770 as part of the inspection he was doing of the Guatemalan dioceses, called Tejutla "Santiago en la Cima del Monte" (English: Santiago at the top of the hill" and reported that there were "sixty four families who lived very well" in the area.

The Central American United Provinces constitution from 11 October 1821, showed Tejutla under modern San Marcos jurisdiction for the very first time.

In 1870 Tejutla reached "Villa" category and, due to its development, its authorities requested to the House of Representatives of Guatemala to be named a Department capital. The department was going to have the municipalities mentioned above, along with the modern municipalities of Cuilco, Santa Bárbara and San Gaspar, Huehuetenango, from the modern Huehuetenango Department. Besides, in those days, Motocintla, Cacahuatán and Tapachula—which would go definitively to Mexico in 1892 due to the Herrera-Mariscal treaty— were under the jurisdiction of the Mercedarian convent located in Tejutla. Furthermore, Tejutla even had House representatives of its own in those days.

But power shifted when the conservatives led by Field Marshal Vicente Cerna were defeated by the liberal forces of generals Miguel Garcia Granados and Justo Rufino Barrios −who was a San Lorenzo native; once the liberals were in power, the expelled the regular clergy from Guatemala leaving Tejutla without their main administrative and leadership support, the Mercedarians. In fact, Barrios government confiscated monasteries, large extensions of farm land, sugar mills and Indian doctrines from the Mercedarians and other regular orders and then distributed it to his liberal friend and comrades, who became large landowners in the area.

=== 21st century ===
In 2009 Sipacapa was the center of a dispute between local residents, who primarily identified as (Sipakapense), and Goldcorp, a Canadian company that operates an open pit goldmine mostly the neighbouring municipality of San Miguel Ixtahuacán, but partially in Sipacapa. This dispute has been documented in a documentary film production, "Sipakapa No Se Vende" (Sipacapa Is Not For Sale). Further information on the mine and the dispute is contained in the article on Marlin mine.

== Climate ==
Sipacapa has temperate climate (Köppen: Cwb).

Climate data for Sipacapa
Month	Jan	Feb	Mar	Apr	May	Jun	Jul	Aug	Sep	Oct	Nov	Dec	Year
Mean daily maximum °C (°F)	21.6 (70.9)	22.5 (72.5)	24.3 (75.7)	24.9 (76.8)	24.4 (75.9)	23.0 (73.4)	22.9 (73.2)	23.4 (74.1)	22.8 (73.0)	22.2 (72.0)	22.1 (71.8)	21.4 (70.5)	23.0 (73.3)
Daily mean °C (°F)	14.6 (58.3)	15.1 (59.2)	16.8 (62.2)	17.8 (64.0)	18.2 (64.8)	17.7 (63.9)	17.4 (63.3)	17.4 (63.3)	17.2 (63.0)	16.7 (62.1)	15.8 (60.4)	14.8 (58.6)	16.6 (61.9)
Mean daily minimum °C (°F)	7.6 (45.7)	7.8 (46.0)	9.4 (48.9)	10.8 (51.4)	12.1 (53.8)	12.5 (54.5)	11.9 (53.4)	11.4 (52.5)	11.7 (53.1)	11.3 (52.3)	9.5 (49.1)	8.3 (46.9)	10.4 (50.6)
Average precipitation mm (inches)	7 (0.3)	9 (0.4)	25 (1.0)	56 (2.2)	146 (5.7)	270 (10.6)	183 (7.2)	181 (7.1)	256 (10.1)	177 (7.0)	34 (1.3)	10 (0.4)	1,354 (53.3)
Source: Climate-Data.org

== Geographic location ==
Sipacapa is 85 km north of municipal capital, San Marcos.

== See also ==
- La Aurora International Airport
- Tapachula International Airport

== Notes and references ==
=== Bibliography ===
- Cortés y Larraz, Pedro (1770). Descripción Geográfico-Moral de la Diócesis de Goathemala (in Spanish). Guatemala: Diócesis de Guatemala.
- Duarte Godínez, Boris Gustavo (2010). Municipio de Comitancillo: Diagnóstico administrativo municipal (PDF). Ejercicio Profesional Supervisado (in Spanish). Guatemala: Facultad de Ciencias Económicas, Universidad de San Carlos de Guatemala.
- Fuentes y Guzmán, Francisco Antonio de (1932) [1690]. Recordación Florida. Discurso historial y demostración natural, material, militar y política del Reyno de Guatemala. Biblioteca Goathemala de la Sociedad de Geografía e Historia Volumen VI (in Spanish). Vol. I–III. Guatemala: Tipografía Nacional.
