= San Marcos Department =

Department of Guatemala

Coordinates: 14°57′40″N 91°47′44″W

San Marcos Department Departmento de San Marcos
- Department of Guatemala
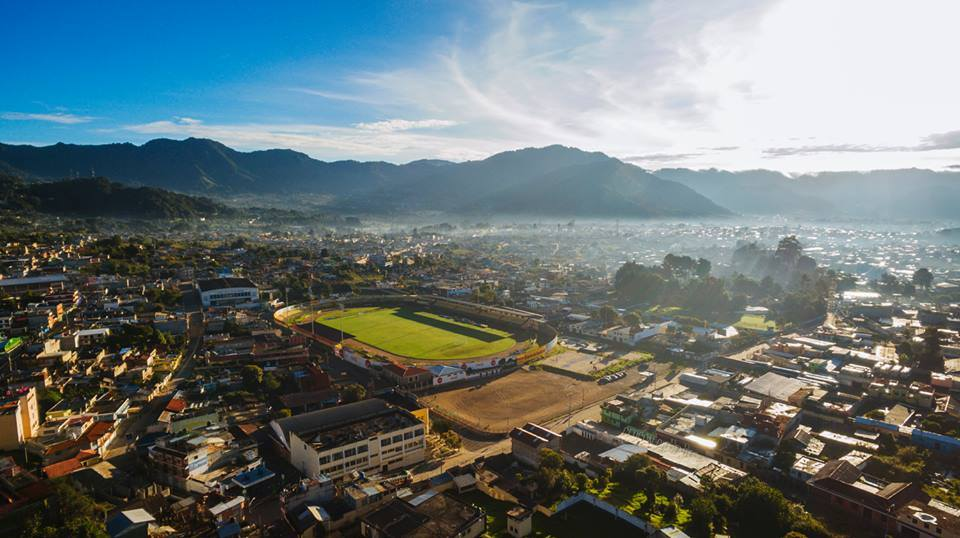
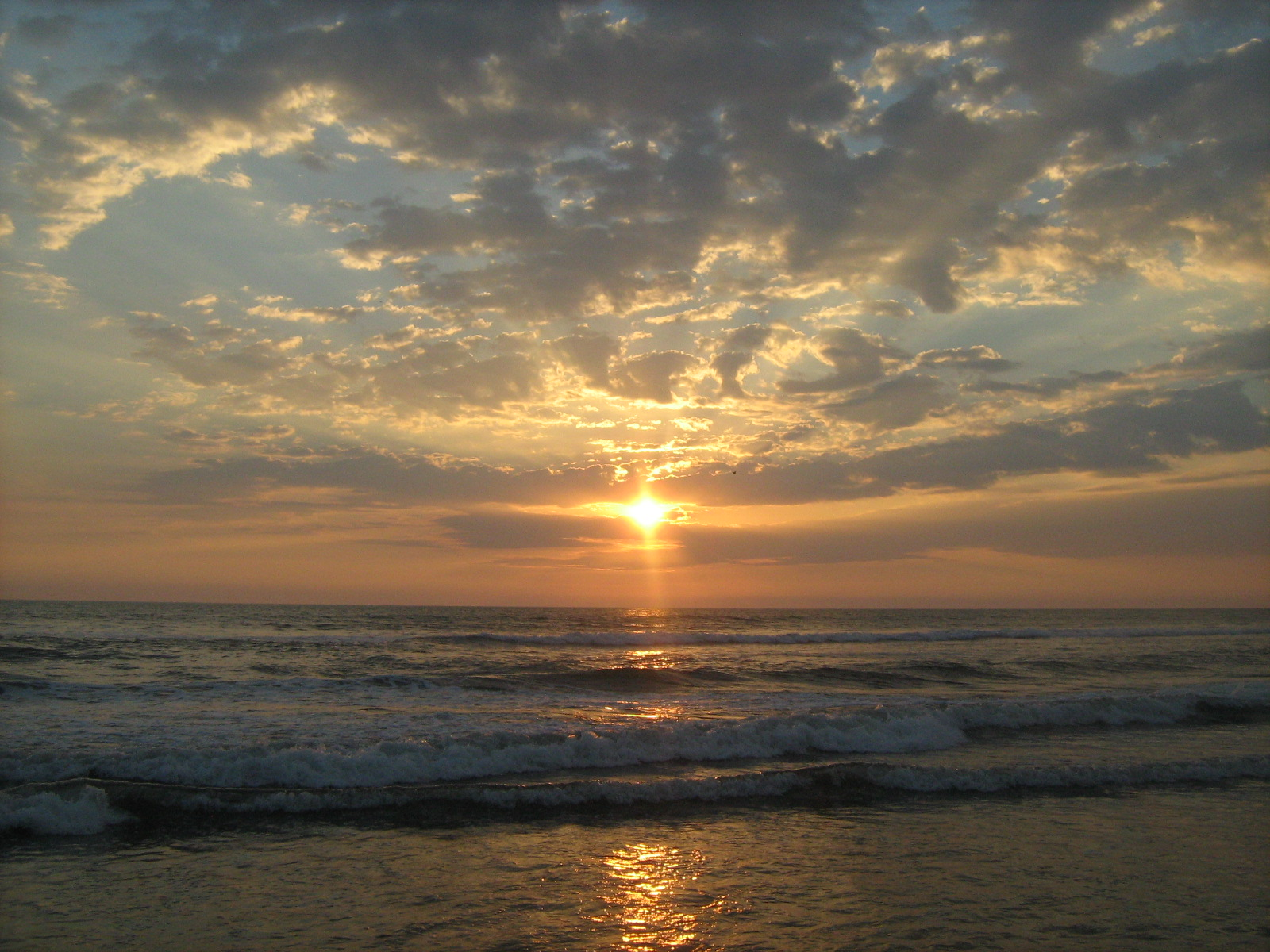
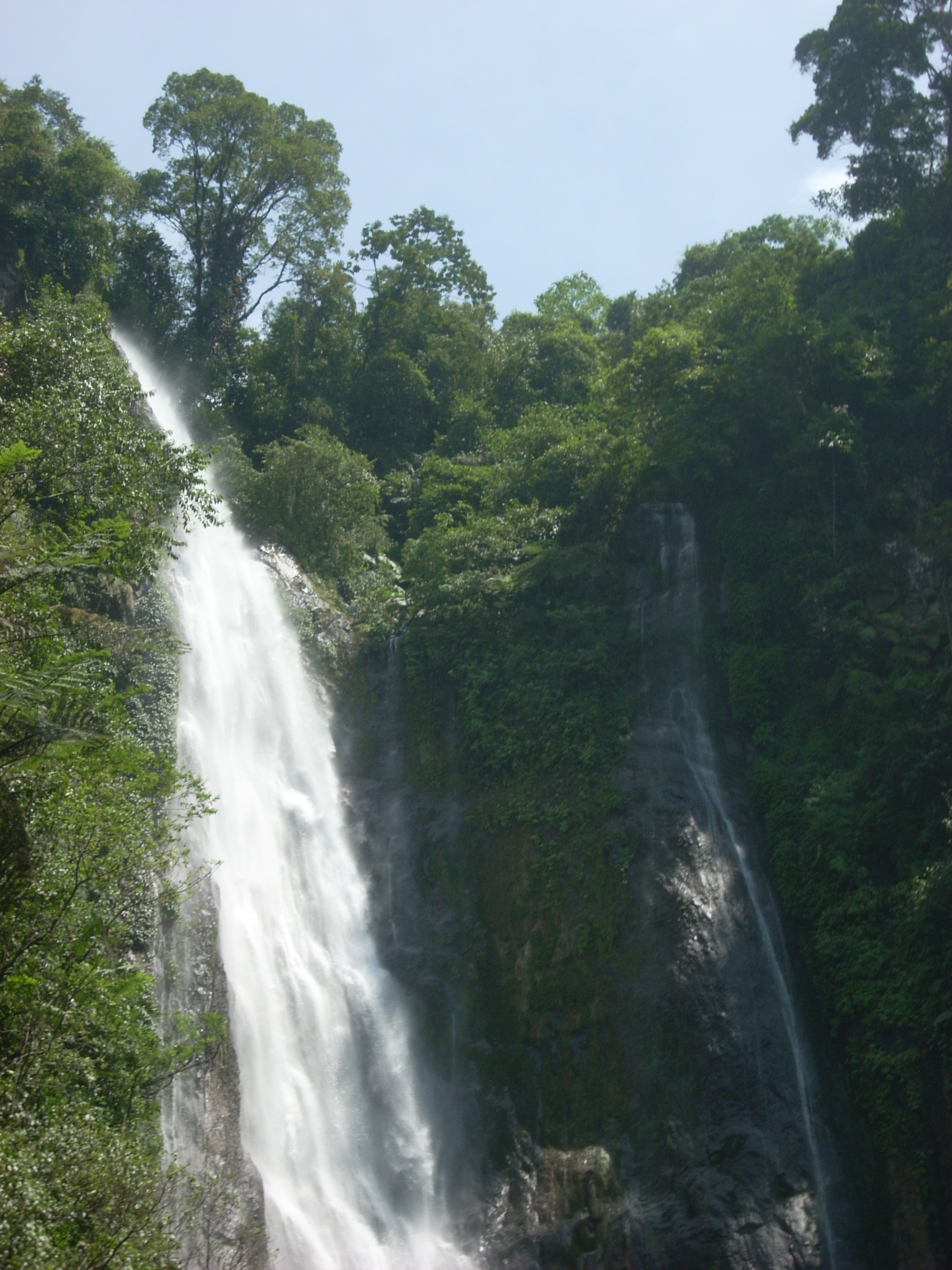
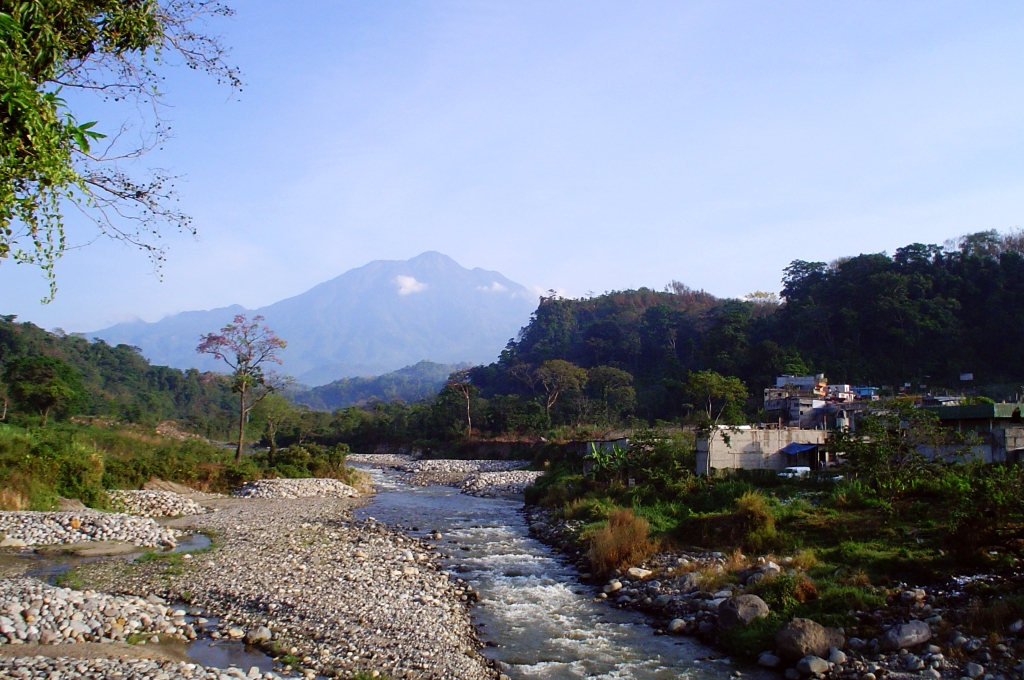
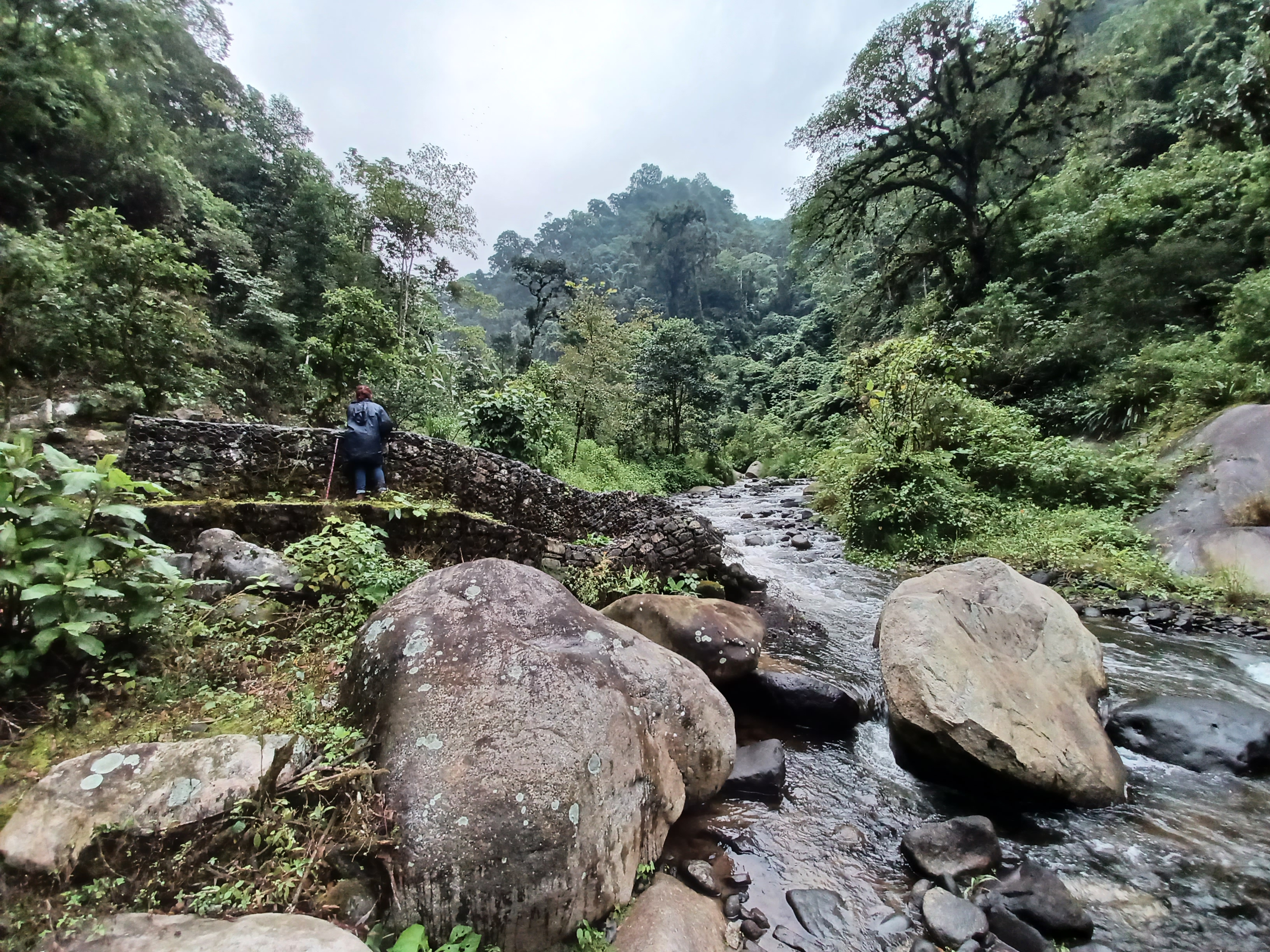
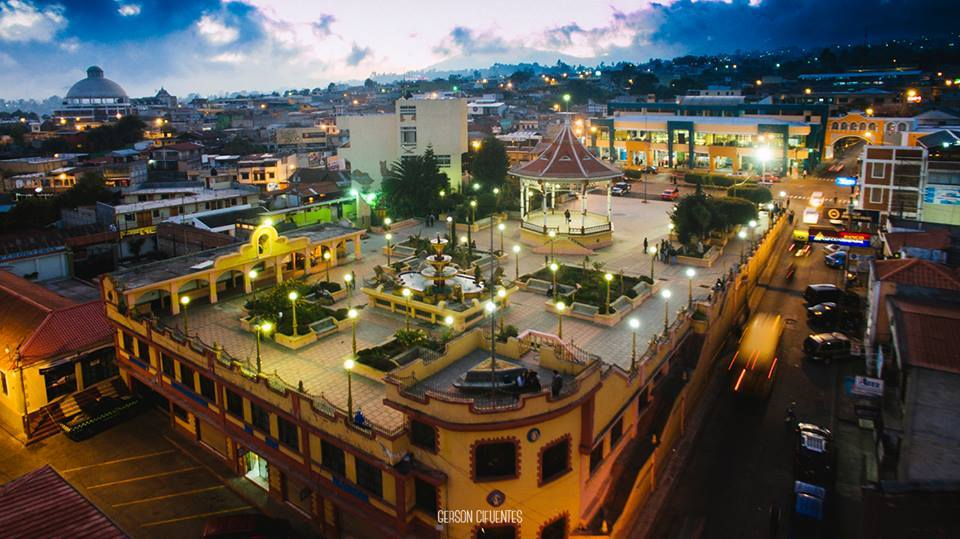
- Sunrise in San Marcos Ocós Waterfalls San Pablo Volcán Tajumulco Cabuz River San Marcos Park

- Flag Coat of arms

- Country: Guatemala
- Capital: San Marcos
- Municipalities: 30

Government
  - Type: Departmental

Population (2018)
  - Department of Guatemala: 1,032,277
  - Rank: 4th in Guatemala
  - Urban: 262,033
  - Religions: Roman Catholicism Evangelicalism Maya
- Time zone: UTC-6

San Marcos (Spanish pronunciation: [ˌsam ˈmaɾkos]) is a department in southwestern Guatemala, on the Pacific Ocean and along the western Guatemala–Mexico border.

The department's capital is the city of San Marcos.

== History ==
=== Colonial period ===
The Spanish conquest of Guatemalan Highlands occurred in the 1520s, followed by the establishment of the Province of Tecusitlán and Lacandón within the Viceroyalty of New Spain. Candacuchex, a settlement of the Mayan Mam people, became the site of the city of San Marcos, established in 1533.

In 1546, once the Guatemalan archdiocese was established, bishop Francisco Marroquín split the ecclesiastical duties in the region among the Order of Preachers, Franciscans and Mercedarians, being the latter appointed to take care of "El Barrio" (in present-day San Marcos and Huehuetenango Departments), which was then a part of the Province of Quetzaltenango]. In 1609 the Captaincy General of Guatemala was established.

In 1690, the Tejutla "curato" had a large area and included the modern municipalities of Comitancillo, Ixchiguán, Concepción Tutuapa, Sipacapa, Sibinal, Tajumulco, Tacaná and part of what is now San Miguel Ixtahuacán. According to the historical writings from Recordación Florida of Francisco Antonio de Fuentes y Guzmán, Tejutla belonged to Quetzaltenango Department and it was a "prosperous land with rich weathers and comfortable forest with enough water".

Tejutla was an important commercial and religious center; in August 1767, Joseph Domingo Hidalgo described Santiago Tejutla as "El Curato" -i.e., the focal center of commerce of all the towns that were around it− in the Gaceta de Guatemala, the official newspaper of the times. Then, in the last quarter of the 18th century, bishop Dr. Pedro Cortés y Larraz, who arrived from Cuilco in 1770 as part of the inspection he was doing of the Guatemalan dioceses, called Tejutla "Santiago en la Cima del Monte" (English: Santiago at the top of the hill" and reported that there were "sixty four families who lived very well" in the area.

In 1754 the Mercedarians gave away their convent to the secular clergy per the Borbonic reforms that were instituted by the King of Spain, and Tejutla became a secular "curato".

=== Independence ===
The Act of Independence of Central America was issued in 1821. The Provincial Council of the Province of Guatemala within the Captaincy General of Guatemala proclaimed the independence of Central America from the Spanish Empire. After being annexed by the First Mexican Empire in 1821, the Federal Republic of Central America was founded in 1823, which included the present day San Marcos region of Guatemala.

The department was created by a governmental decree on 8 May 1866, together with Huehuetenango, Izabal and Petén departments. In 1902 the eruption of the Santa María volcano in the neighbouring department of Quetzaltenango was responsible for the destruction of the twin towns of San Marcos and San Pedro Sacatepéquez. The towns were rebuilt and in 1935 were joined to form the new municipality of San Marcos La Unión. This new municipality did not last long and the unified municipalities were again split in 1945 with San Marcos remaining the departmental capital.

=== 21st century ===
Towards the end of the 20th century, San Marcos became a hot spot for drug trafficking in Central America, and one of the top lords was Juan Chamalé Ortiz, who was heavily involved in cocaine trafficking, and was accused by US authorities of helping to move over 40 tons of cocaine through Central America en route to the United States. Ortiz worked with local fishermen to smuggle cocaine in small fishing boats and may have also commissioned semi-submersibles to transport the drug. Ortiz also controlled a major opium poppy producing area, the San Marcos Department, where he was a popular local figure. He owned at least ten estates in his area of operations, including a large farm in Malacatán and provided numerous jobs, in addition to cultivating local support by throwing parties and sponsoring beauty contests.

San Marcos is one of the most important regions in Guatemala given its proximity to the highlands, Mexico, and to the Pacific Ocean coast, where most of the drugs coming from South America land. Ortiz exerted influence over local politicians and police in the region, and relied on a powerful local support network to conduct his business. He is thought to have worked out a deal that made him the Sinaloa Cartel's top transporter, helping the Mexican group move drugs that arrived via Pacific routes. Ortiz Chamalé was captured in 2011 in Quetzaltenango and extradited to the United States in 2014 where he was sentenced to 262 months in jail; when Ortiz was arrested in 2011, locals protested to demand his release.

== Geography ==
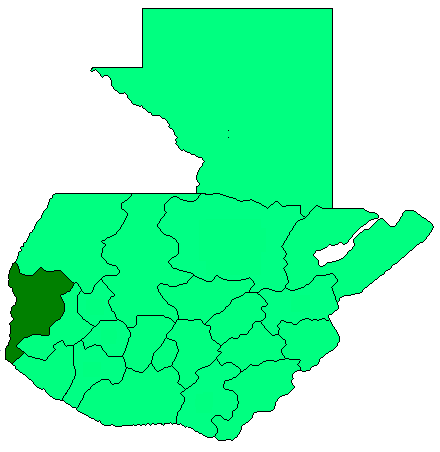
Location San Marcos within Guatemala

San Marcos is bordered on the northeast by the department of Huehuetenango, on the east by the department of Quetzaltenango, to the south by the department of Retalhuleu and by the Pacific Ocean, and on the west by the Mexican state of Chiapas.

The department has a total territory of 2,397 square kilometres (925 sq mi).

The northern portion of the department is mountainous, being crossed by the Sierra Madre de Chiapas mountain range. The two highest volcanoes in Central America being located within its borders, Tajumulco (4,220 metres (13,850 ft) high) and Tacaná (4,092 metres (13,425 ft) high). The Tajumulco volcano is the highest peak in Central America. Other notable peaks include San Antonio Ichiguán at 4,022 metres (13,196 ft) above mean sea level. The southern portion of the department drops away towards the Pacific coast.

The Tacaná volcano, which occupies the border with Mexico and has slopes in both countries, has been historically active, with activity recorded in 1855, 1878, from 1900 through to 1903, from 1949 to 1950 and from 1986 to 1987.

Principal rivers in the department include the Suchiate River, which marks the border between San Marcos and Chiapas, Mexico, and flows into the Pacific Ocean. The Cabuz River has its source on the slopes of the Tajumulco volcano. Other rivers include the El Pajapa, El Rodeo, Ixlamá, Ixtal, Meléndrez, Nahuatán, Tilapa, and Ocosito Rivers.

The climate varies widely within the department, due to the dramatic differences in altitude, with the north possessing a cold Guatemalan Highlands climate and the south having a temperate or hot climate, depending on the specific altitude.

== Population ==
The 2018 census recorded the total population of San Marcos department as 1,032,277. Languages spoken in the department include Spanish, Mam and Sipakapense.

== Economy and agriculture ==
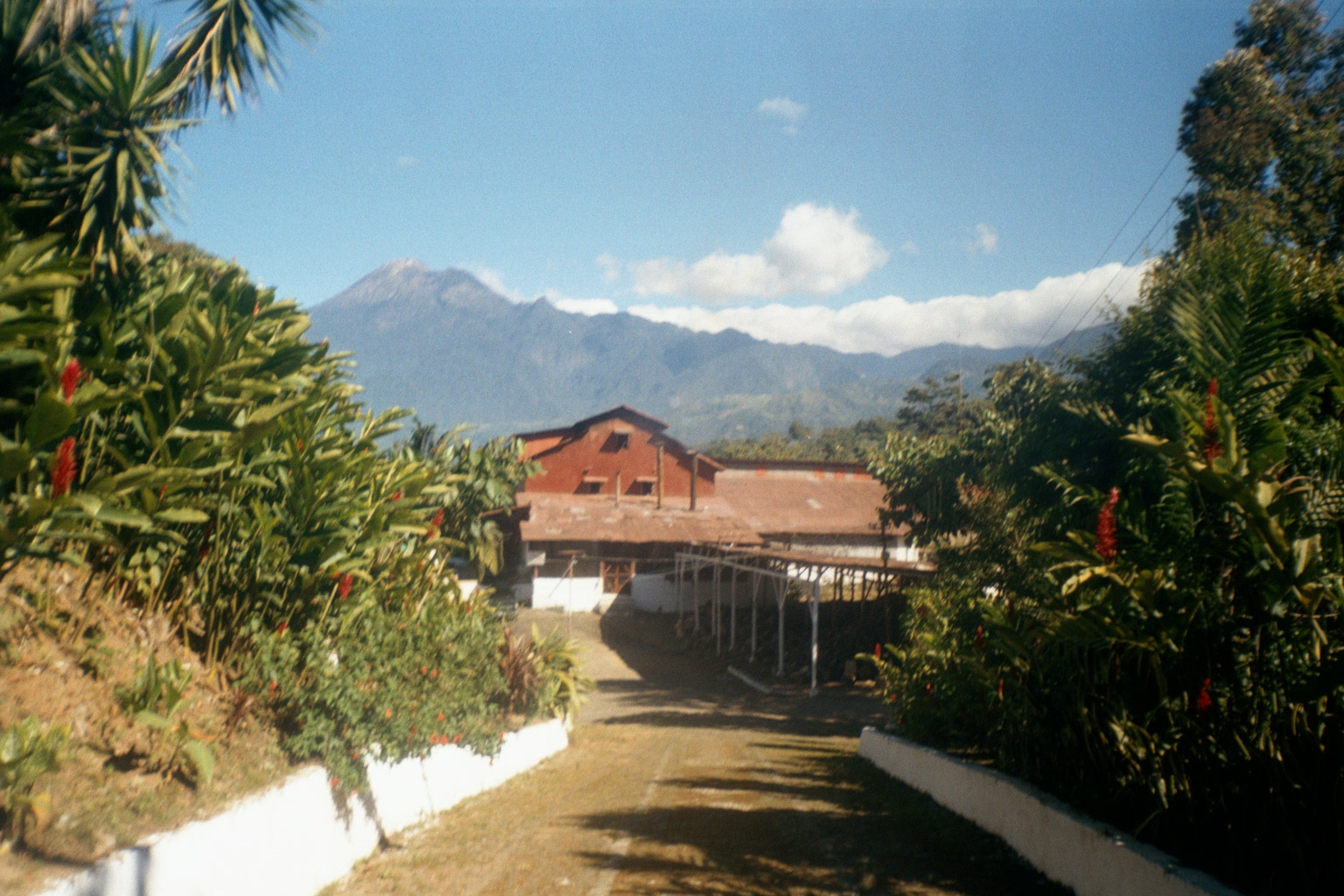
Finca El Platanillo coffee plantation, with the Tajmulco volcano behind

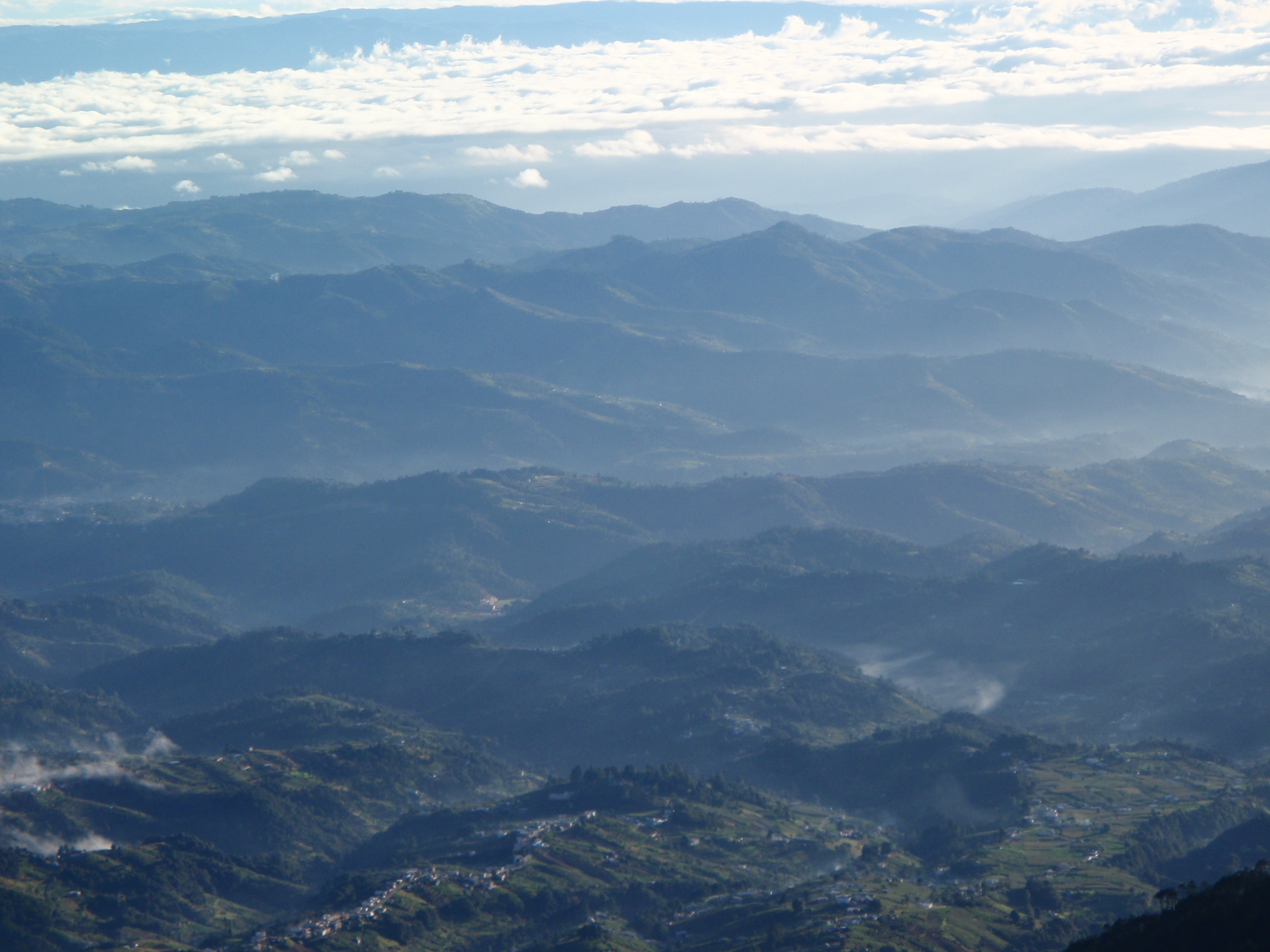
Farming communities below Volcán Tajumulco in San Marcos.

The wide variety of climates within the department resulting from differences in altitude gives rise to a variety of agricultural products. Agricultural products include apples, bananas, barley, beans, cacao, coffee, maize, oats, peaches, plantains, potatoes, rice, sugarcane and wheat. Livestock include cattle, horses and sheep. San Marcos department produces more wool than any other department of Guatemala. It is generally exported to the departments of Quetzaltenango and Totonicapán, where it is processed into finished products. The department produces wooden furniture, with production being concentrated in the Pacific lowlands due to the greater variety of wood available, including cedar, ceiba and tepemixte.

The department is notable for the importation of black market Mexican products, which are sold openly in local markets throughout its territory and from there are exported throughout Guatemala.

== Municipalities ==
The department of San Marcos is divided into 30 municipalities:

San Marcos municipalities
Municipality	Ethnicity	Population (Note: 2002 census.)	Festival	Altitude	Extent
Ayutla		27,435	1st Friday of Lent	24 metres (79 ft)	204 square kilometres (79 sq mi)
Catarina		24,561	25 November	233 metres (764 ft)	76 square kilometres (29 sq mi)
Comitancillo		46,371	3 May	2,280 metres (7,480 ft)	113 square kilometres (44 sq mi)
Concepción Tutuapa		49,363	8 December	2,910 metres (9,550 ft)	176 square kilometres (68 sq mi)
El Quetzal		18,979	12 November & 6 January	940 metres (3,080 ft)	88 square kilometres (34 sq mi)
El Rodeo		14,125	19 March	700 metres (2,300 ft)	81 square kilometres (31 sq mi)
El Tumbador		35,501	6 January	920 metres (3,020 ft)	84 square kilometres (32 sq mi)
Esquipulas Palo Gordo		8,613	15 January	2,474 metres (8,117 ft)	21 square kilometres (8.1 sq mi)
Ixchiguan		20,324	5th Friday of Lent, 23 January & 29 July	3,200 metres (10,500 ft)	183 square kilometres (71 sq mi)
La Reforma		14,623	1 January	1,139 metres (3,737 ft)	100 square kilometres (39 sq mi)
Malacatán		70,834	13 December	390 metres (1,280 ft)	204 square kilometres (79 sq mi)
Nuevo Progreso		26,140	12 December	660 metres (2,170 ft)	140 square kilometres (54 sq mi)
Ocós		10,841		3 metres (9.8 ft)	50.8 square kilometres (19.6 sq mi)
Pajapita		16,600	8 December	97 metres (318 ft)	84 square kilometres (32 sq mi)
Río Blanco	Mam	4,872	8 July	2,650 metres (8,690 ft)	21 square kilometres (8.1 sq mi)
San Antonio Sacatepéquez		14,658	17 January	2,338 metres (7,671 ft)	79 square kilometres (31 sq mi)
San Cristóbal Cucho		13,928	29 July	2,350 metres (7,710 ft)	36 square kilometres (14 sq mi)
San José Ojetenam		16,541	19 March	3,050 metres (10,010 ft)	37 square kilometres (14 sq mi)
San Lorenzo		9,714	10 August	1,620 metres (5,310 ft)	25 square kilometres (9.7 sq mi)
San Marcos		36,325	25 April	2,397 metres (7,864 ft)	121 square kilometres (47 sq mi)
San Miguel Ixtahuacán		29,658	29 September	2,050 metres (6,730 ft)	184 square kilometres (71 sq mi)
San Pablo		36,535	25 January	610 metres (2,000 ft)	124 square kilometres (48 sq mi)
San Pedro Sacatepéquez		58,005	29 June	2,330 metres (7,640 ft)	253 square kilometres (98 sq mi)
San Rafael Pie de La Cuesta		13,072	24 October	1,038 metres (3,406 ft)	60 square kilometres (23 sq mi)
Sibinal		13,268	29 September	2,510 metres (8,230 ft)	176 square kilometres (68 sq mi)
Sipacapa		14,043	24 August	1,970 metres (6,460 ft)	152 square kilometres (59 sq mi)
Tacaná		62,620	15 August	2,410 metres (7,910 ft)	302 square kilometres (117 sq mi)
Tajumulco		41,308	8 July	2,050 metres (6,730 ft)	300 square kilometres (120 sq mi)
Tejutla		27,672	25 July	2,520 metres (8,270 ft)	142 square kilometres (55 sq mi)
La Blanca		29,112			96.1 square kilometres (37.1 sq mi)

== Tourism ==
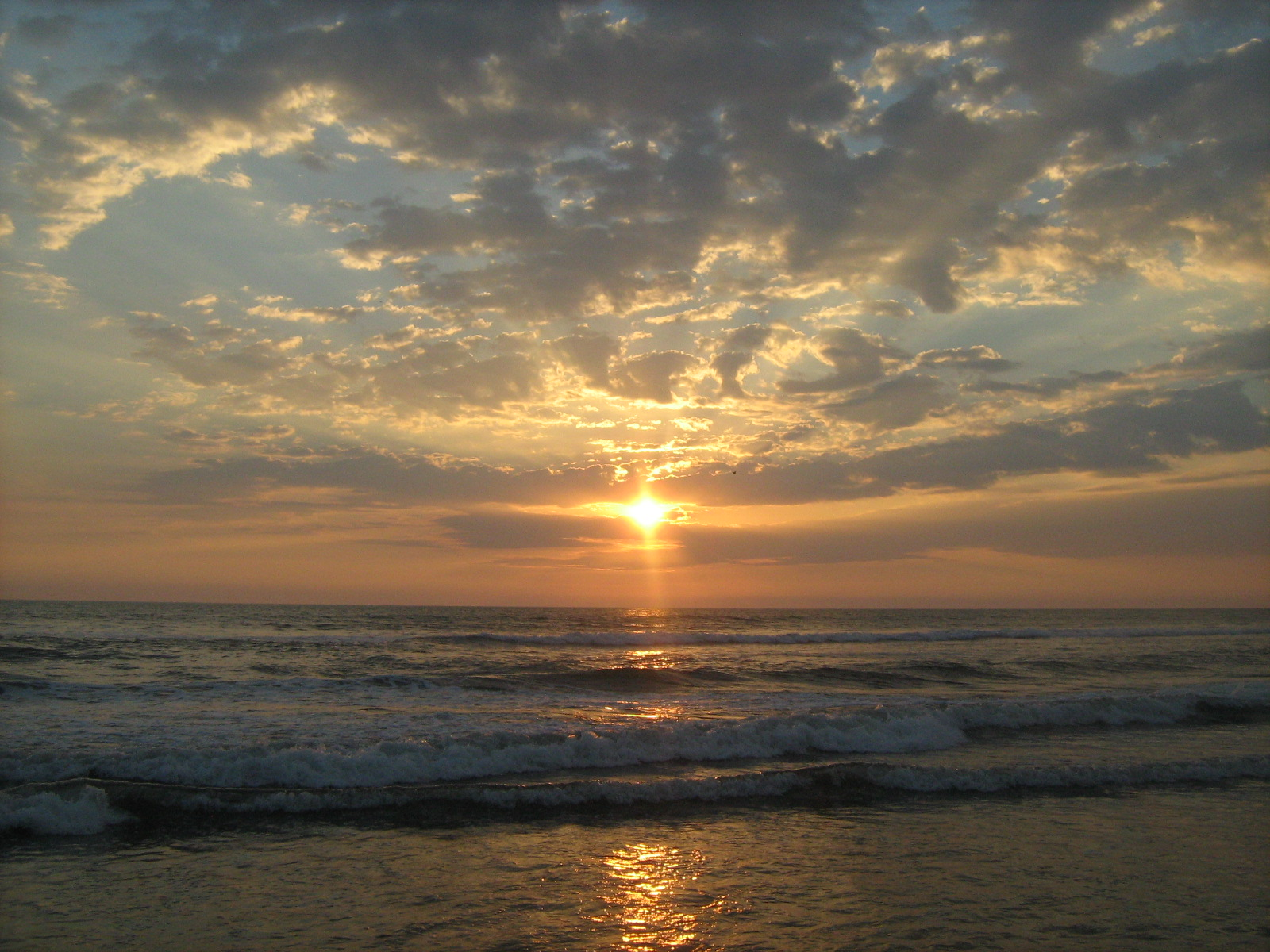
Sunset at Tilapa beach, La Blanca, San Marcos

The main tourist attractions of the San Marcos department are its various Pacific beaches and the Tacaná and Tajumulco volcanoes. Other attractions include thermal baths and the caves of Castalia.

== Notes and references ==
=== Bibliography ===
- del Aguila, Juan Enrique (2005). San Marcos: Información Histórica-Geográfica del Departamento (in Spanish). Guatemala: Del Aguila Consultores.
- Cortés y Larraz, Pedro (1770). Descripción Geográfico-Moral de la Diócesis de Goathemala (in Spanish). Guatemala: Diócesis de Guatemala.
- Encyclopædia Britannica Online (2011). "Tajumulco Volcano". Encyclopædia Britannica. Encyclopædia Britannica Online.
- Fuentes y Guzmán, Francisco Antonio de (1932) [1690]. Recordación Florida. Discurso historial y demostración natural, material, militar y política del Reyno de Guatemala. Biblioteca Goathemala de la Sociedad de Geografía e Historia Volumen VI (in Spanish). Vol. I–III. Guatemala: Tipografía Nacional.
- Hernández, Gonzalo; Martínez, Mildred (2004). "San Marcos: La capital de la hospitalidad" (PDF) (in Spanish). Guatemala: Prensa Libre. Archived from the original (PDF) on 2011-07-15.
- INSIVUMEH. "Volcanes de Guatemala" (in Spanish). Guatemala City: Instituto Nacional de Sismología, Vulcanología, Meteorologíá e Hidrologíá (INSIVUMEH) - Ministerio de Comunicaciones, Infraestructura y Vivienda.
- Pérez, Pedro Nolasco O. de M. (1966). Historia de las Misiones Mercedarias en América (in Spanish). Madrid: Revista "Estudios".
- Servicio de Información Municipal de Inforpress (1). "Departamento de San Marcos" (in Spanish). Guatemala City: INFORPRESSCA.
- Servicio de Información Municipal de Inforpress (2). "Río Blanco, San Marcos" (in Spanish). Guatemala City: INFORPRESSCA.
