= Río Blanco, San Marcos =

Río Blanco
- Location in Guatemala
- Coordinates: 15°02′00″N 91°41′00″W
- Country: Guatemala
- Department: San Marcos

Government
  - Mayor (2012-2020): Eugenio López (UNE)

Population (2021)
  - Total: 6,085

Río Blanco is a mountainous municipality in the San Marcos department of Guatemala at 2650 altitude. Mam and Spanish are spoken there.

== Climate ==
Río Blanco has temperate climate (Köppen: Cwb).

Climate data for Río Blanco
Month	Jan	Feb	Mar	Apr	May	Jun	Jul	Aug	Sep	Oct	Nov	Dec	Year
Mean daily maximum °C (°F)	17.4 (63.3)	17.8 (64.0)	19.4 (66.9)	20.0 (68.0)	19.5 (67.1)	18.7 (65.7)	18.6 (65.5)	19.0 (66.2)	18.4 (65.1)	17.8 (64.0)	17.9 (64.2)	17.6 (63.7)	18.5 (65.3)
Daily mean °C (°F)	10.0 (50.0)	10.3 (50.5)	11.7 (53.1)	12.9 (55.2)	13.8 (56.8)	13.8 (56.8)	13.6 (56.5)	13.3 (55.9)	13.4 (56.1)	12.8 (55.0)	11.6 (52.9)	10.8 (51.4)	12.3 (54.2)
Mean daily minimum °C (°F)	2.6 (36.7)	2.8 (37.0)	4.1 (39.4)	5.9 (42.6)	8.1 (46.6)	8.9 (48.0)	8.6 (47.5)	7.7 (45.9)	8.5 (47.3)	7.8 (46.0)	5.3 (41.5)	4.1 (39.4)	6.2 (43.2)
Average precipitation mm (inches)	5 (0.2)	5 (0.2)	18 (0.7)	56 (2.2)	171 (6.7)	235 (9.3)	166 (6.5)	194 (7.6)	247 (9.7)	164 (6.5)	25 (1.0)	9 (0.4)	1,295 (51)
Source: Climate-Data.org
