= San Antonio Sacatepéquez =

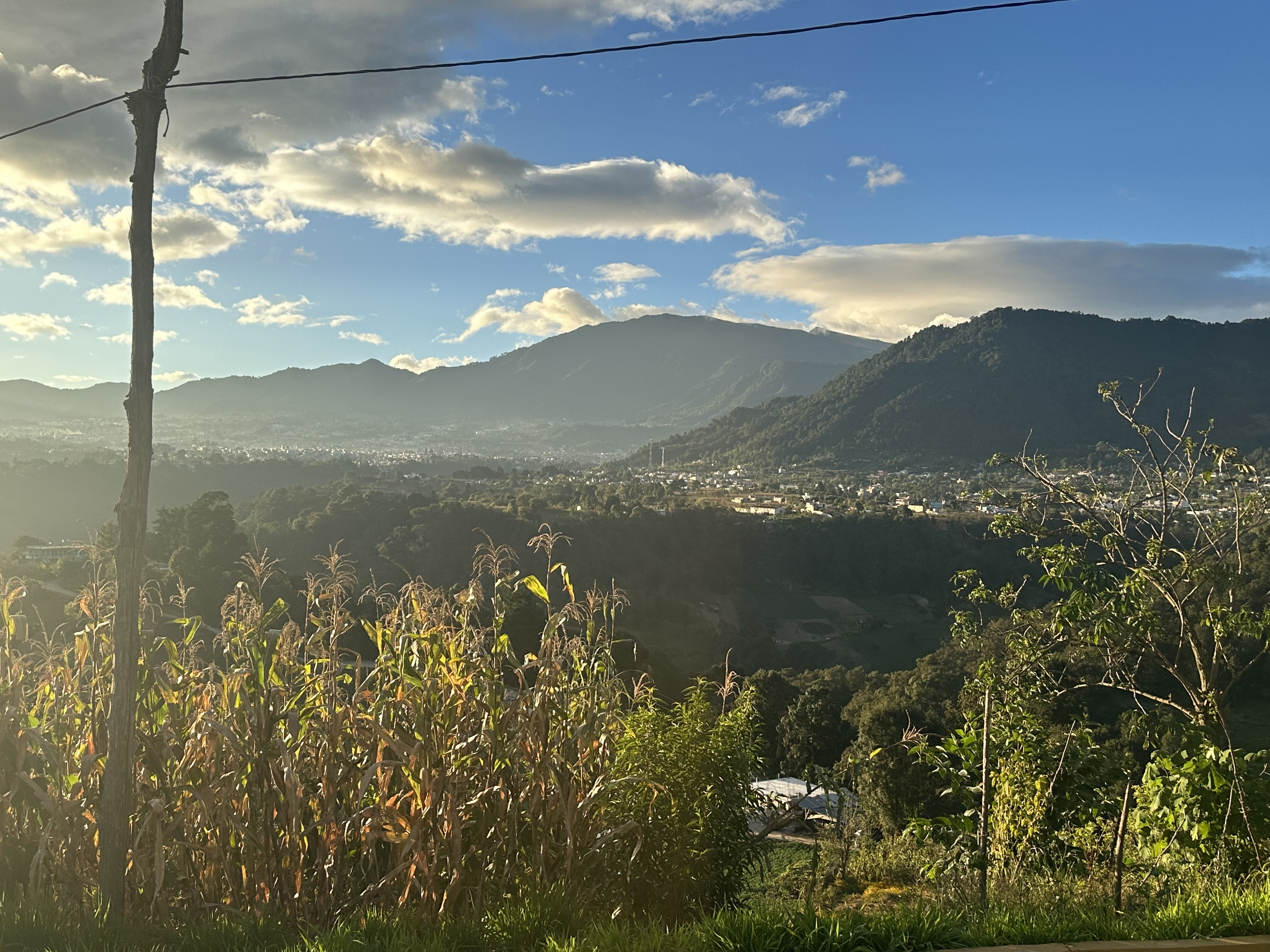
- Panoramic view of San Antonio Sacatepéquez

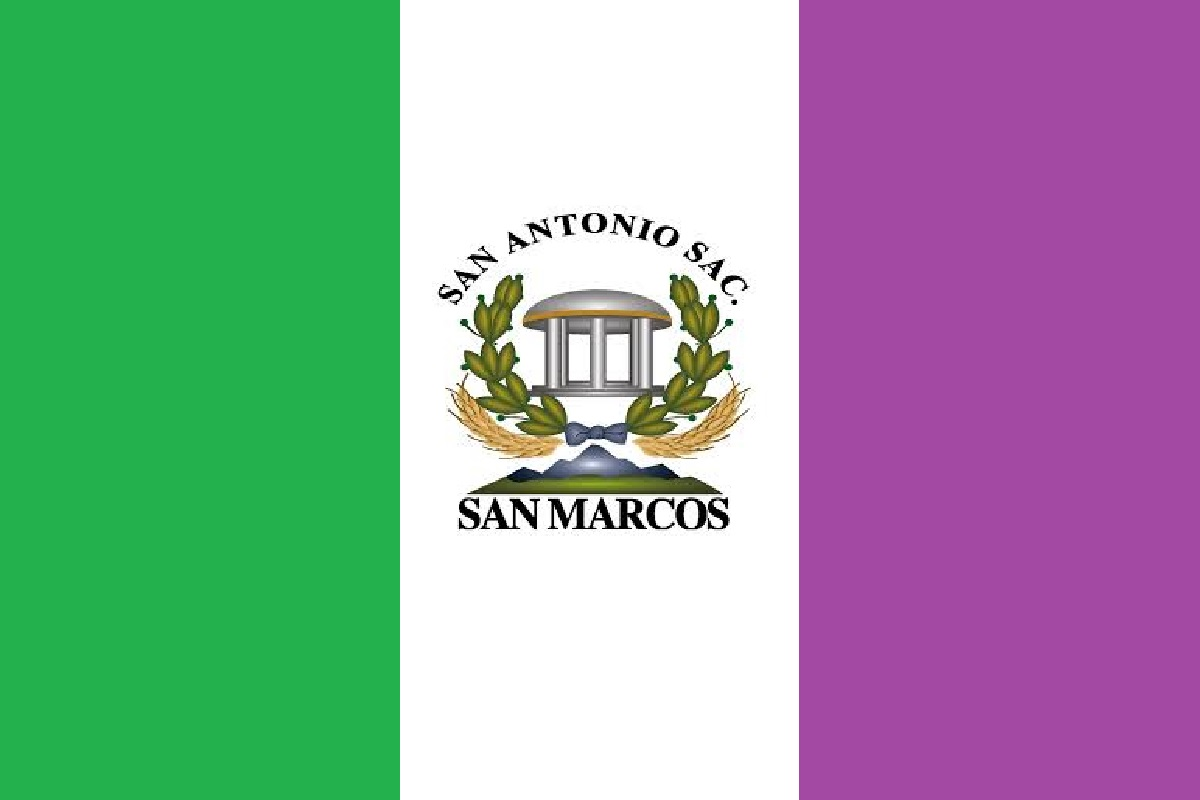
- Flag

- Location in Guatemala
- Coordinates: 14°58′N 91°44′W
- Country: Guatemala
- Department: San Marcos

Government
  - Mayor (2012-2020): Willian Fuentes (Partido Patriota)
- Time zone: GMT -6
- Climate: Cwb

San Antonio Sacatepéquez (Spanish pronunciation: [san anˈtonjo sakateˈpekes]) is a municipality in the San Marcos department of Guatemala.

== Communities ==
San Antonio Sacatepéquez communities
Location	#	Name
Villages	1	Las Barrancas
Villages	2	San Isidro Ixcolochi
Villages	3	Candelaria Siquival
Villages	4	Santa Rita
Villages	5	Santa Irene
Villages	6	San Miguel de Los Altos
Villages	7	Santa Rosa de Lima
Villages	8	San José Granados
Villages	9	San Rafael Sacatepéquez
Villages	10	Santo Domingo
Settlements	1	La Felicidad
Settlements	2	Vista Hermosa
Settlements	3	San Francisco
Settlements	4	Siete Tambores
Settlements	5	Nueva Jerusalén
Settlements	6	Potrerillos
Settlements	7	Canchegua
Settlements	8	El Mirador
Settlements	9	San Ramón
Settlements	10	Tojchiná
Settlements	11	Las Escobas

== Climate ==
San Antonio Sacatepéqueztiene clima templado (Köppen:Cwb).

Climate data for San Antonio Sacatepéquez
Month	Jan	Feb	Mar	Apr	May	Jun	Jul	Aug	Sep	Oct	Nov	Dec	Year
Mean daily maximum °C (°F)	17.3 (63.1)	17.8 (64.0)	19.4 (66.9)	20.4 (68.7)	20.3 (68.5)	19.5 (67.1)	19.4 (66.9)	19.9 (67.8)	19.4 (66.9)	18.6 (65.5)	18.2 (64.8)	17.6 (63.7)	19.0 (66.2)
Daily mean °C (°F)	9.8 (49.6)	10.2 (50.4)	11.8 (53.2)	13.4 (56.1)	14.5 (58.1)	14.5 (58.1)	14.4 (57.9)	14.2 (57.6)	14.4 (57.9)	13.5 (56.3)	11.8 (53.2)	10.8 (51.4)	12.8 (55.0)
Mean daily minimum °C (°F)	2.4 (36.3)	2.7 (36.9)	4.2 (39.6)	6.4 (43.5)	8.8 (47.8)	9.6 (49.3)	9.4 (48.9)	8.5 (47.3)	9.4 (48.9)	8.4 (47.1)	5.5 (41.9)	4.1 (39.4)	6.6 (43.9)
Average precipitation mm (inches)	5 (0.2)	5 (0.2)	23 (0.9)	61 (2.4)	210 (8.3)	305 (12.0)	230 (9.1)	252 (9.9)	290 (11.4)	201 (7.9)	21 (0.8)	12 (0.5)	1,615 (63.6)
Source: Climate-Data.org

== Geographic location ==
San Antonio Sacatepéquez is located 9 km SE of San Marcos.
