= Catarina, San Marcos =

Catarina
- Location in Guatemala
- Coordinates: 14°50′57″N 92°04′39″W
- Country: Guatemala
- Department: San Marcos

Government
  - Mayor: Fulbio Pérez (CREO)
- Climate: Am

Catarina is a municipality in the San Marcos department of Guatemala. It is recognised as different municipality on 20 January 1925, when it split from Malacatán municipality.

== Climate ==
Catarina has tropical monsoon climate (Köppen: Am).

Climate data for Catarina (1991–2020)
Month	Jan	Feb	Mar	Apr	May	Jun	Jul	Aug	Sep	Oct	Nov	Dec	Year
Record high °C (°F)	36.2 (97.2)	37.4 (99.3)	37.0 (98.6)	38.4 (101.1)	37.0 (98.6)	35.7 (96.3)	35.6 (96.1)	36.0 (96.8)	36.1 (97.0)	35.7 (96.3)	35.2 (95.4)	34.8 (94.6)	38.4 (101.1)
Mean daily maximum °C (°F)	33.2 (91.8)	33.9 (93.0)	34.2 (93.6)	34.3 (93.7)	33.4 (92.1)	32.6 (90.7)	32.9 (91.2)	33.0 (91.4)	32.5 (90.5)	32.4 (90.3)	32.7 (90.9)	32.8 (91.0)	33.2 (91.8)
Daily mean °C (°F)	26.8 (80.2)	27.4 (81.3)	28.1 (82.6)	28.6 (83.5)	28.2 (82.8)	27.3 (81.1)	27.4 (81.3)	27.3 (81.1)	26.8 (80.2)	26.8 (80.2)	27.0 (80.6)	26.7 (80.1)	27.4 (81.3)
Mean daily minimum °C (°F)	19.2 (66.6)	19.6 (67.3)	20.5 (68.9)	21.7 (71.1)	22.2 (72.0)	21.9 (71.4)	21.5 (70.7)	21.5 (70.7)	21.5 (70.7)	21.2 (70.2)	20.6 (69.1)	19.7 (67.5)	20.9 (69.6)
Record low °C (°F)	16.0 (60.8)	14.5 (58.1)	16.3 (61.3)	17.7 (63.9)	16.9 (62.4)	17.4 (63.3)	16.6 (61.9)	17.9 (64.2)	19.5 (67.1)	16.9 (62.4)	15.9 (60.6)	13.9 (57.0)	13.9 (57.0)
Average precipitation mm (inches)	16.1 (0.63)	18.6 (0.73)	69.6 (2.74)	193.2 (7.61)	518.1 (20.40)	615.3 (24.22)	471.7 (18.57)	517.5 (20.37)	640.4 (25.21)	624.1 (24.57)	179.7 (7.07)	49.2 (1.94)	3,913.5 (154.07)
Average precipitation days (≥ 1.0 mm)	1.4	1.8	4.8	10.1	19.9	22.9	21.9	22.8	24.5	22.3	9.3	2.5	164.2
Source: NOAA

== Geographic location ==
Catarina is surrounded by San Marcos Department municipalities.
