= Ocós =

- Municipality
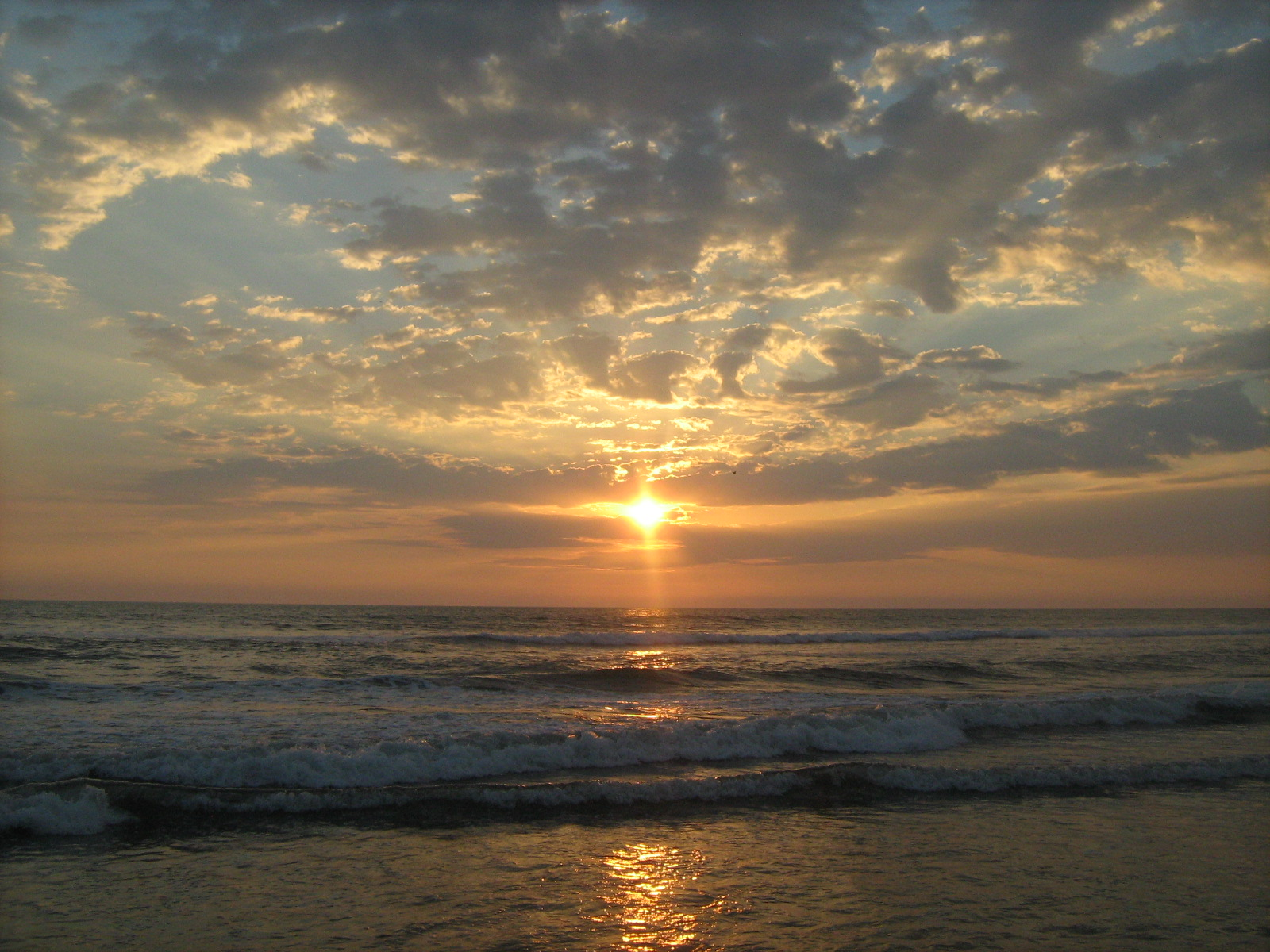

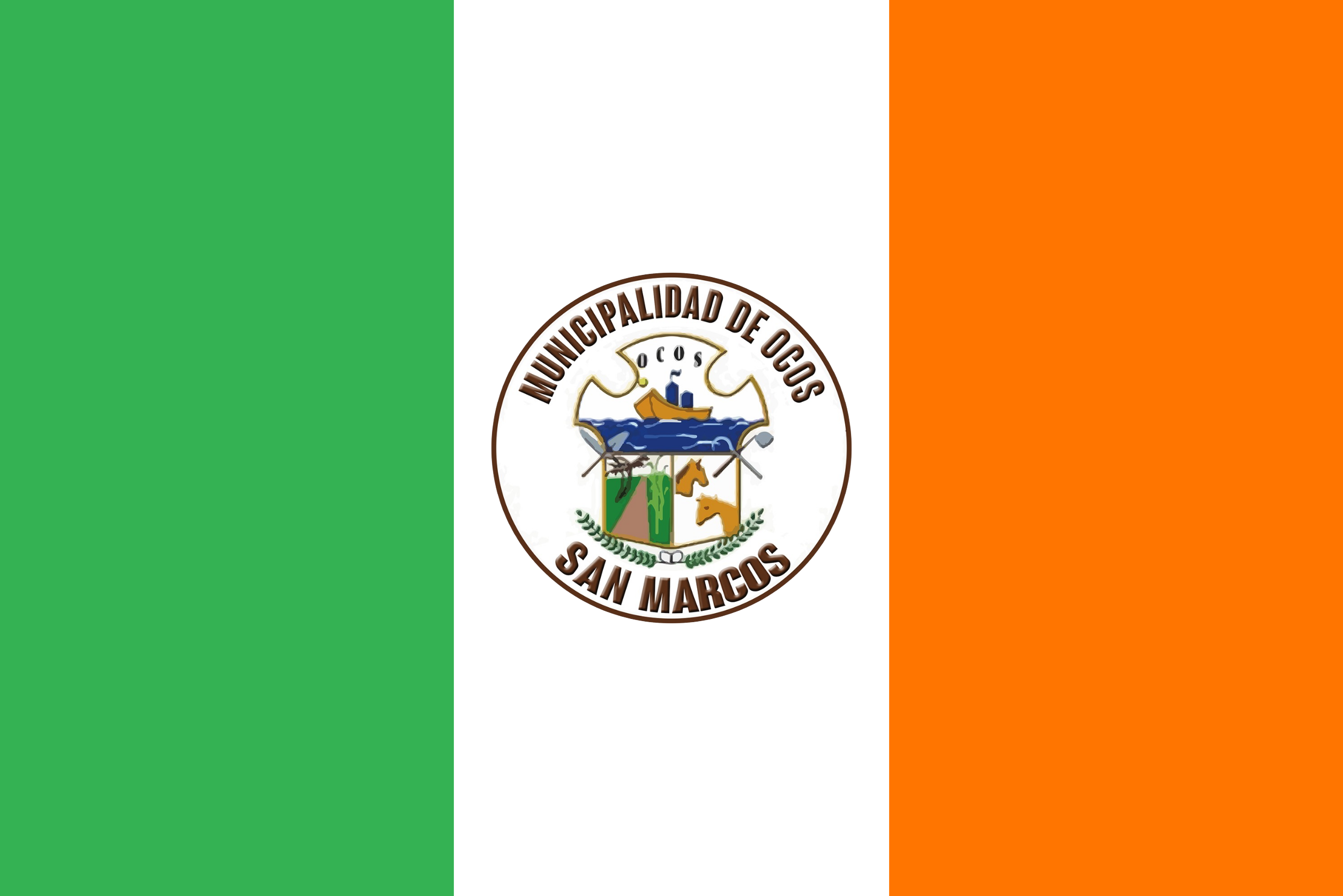
- Flag

- Location in Guatemala
- Coordinates: 14°30′33″N 92°11′36″W
- Country: Guatemala
- Department: San Marcos

Government
  - Mayor (2016–2020): Aníbal Fausto Maldonado (LIDER)

Area
  - Municipality: 50.8 km^{2} (19.6 sq mi)

Population (2018 census)
  - Municipality: 10,841
  - Density: 213/km^{2} (550/sq mi)
  - Urban: 4,417
- Climate: Aw

Ocós is a municipality in the San Marcos Department of Guatemala. It is situated on the Pacific Ocean coast, very close to the border with Mexico at 4 m (13 ft) altitude and two big rivers: the Suchiate and the Naranjo rivers. On 23 January 2014, it lost about 2/3 of its territory when La Blanca was named the thirtieth San Marcos Department municipality.

== History ==
=== 1897 Quetzaltenango Revolt ===
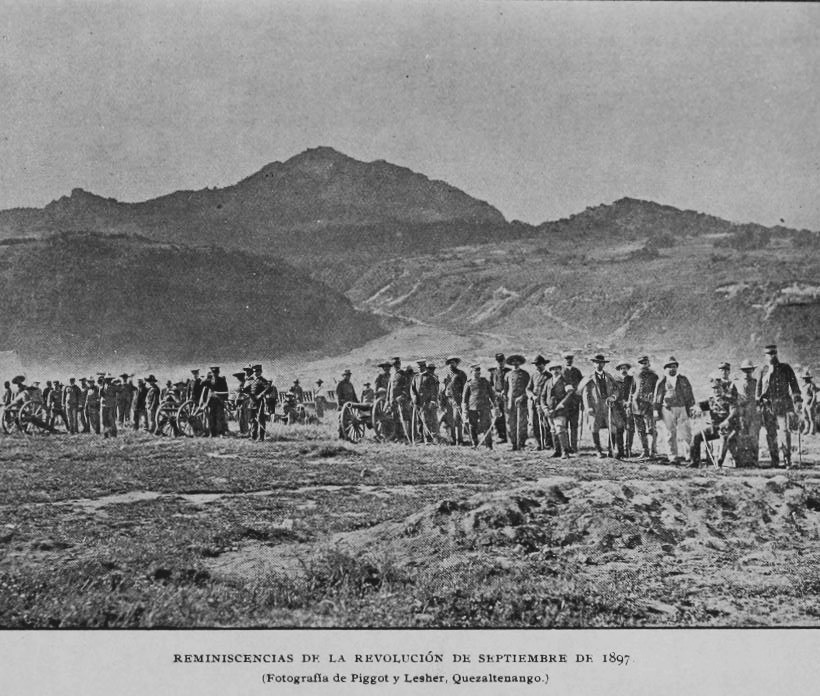
General García León brigade on the Totonicapan fields. Army forces loyal to president Reina Barrios

In September 1897, after the failure of both the interoceanic railroad and the Central American Expo and the deep economic crisis that Guatemala was facing after the plummeting of both coffee and silver international prices, Quetzaltengo people raised in arms against the decision of present José María Reina Barrios to extend his presidential term until 1902. (Note: Back then, the Panama Canal had not been built yet and Reina Barrios had high hopes on getting international investors interested in the interoceanic railroad, which was the main event for the Central American Expo; unfortunately, due to the economic crisis, and bad budgeting, the government could not complete the railroad and after the failure of the Expo, it had to take drastic austerity measures that included closing schools.) A group of rebels, among them a former Secretary of Reina Barrios's cabinet - Próspero Morales - began to combat on 7 September 1897 attacking San Marcos; after several battles and some gains in Ocós, Coatepeque and Colomba, the rebels were definitely defeated on 4 October 1897. As a result, on 23 October 1897, San Pedro Sacatepéquez became the capital of San Marcos Department.

=== Secession of La Blanca ===
On 23 January 2014, La Blanca split from Ocós after the Congress of Guatemala approved the separation by 115 of 158 possible. This meant that Ocós lost both 66% of its territory and population.

== Climate ==
Ocós has a tropical savanna climate (Köppen: Aw).

Climate data for Ocós
Month	Jan	Feb	Mar	Apr	May	Jun	Jul	Aug	Sep	Oct	Nov	Dec	Year
Mean daily maximum °C (°F)	34.1 (93.4)	34.4 (93.9)	35.4 (95.7)	35.5 (95.9)	35.1 (95.2)	33.6 (92.5)	34.0 (93.2)	34.1 (93.4)	33.6 (92.5)	33.6 (92.5)	33.7 (92.7)	33.5 (92.3)	34.2 (93.6)
Daily mean °C (°F)	26.7 (80.1)	27.0 (80.6)	28.3 (82.9)	29.1 (84.4)	29.2 (84.6)	28.3 (82.9)	28.3 (82.9)	28.4 (83.1)	28.1 (82.6)	28.1 (82.6)	27.6 (81.7)	26.8 (80.2)	28.0 (82.4)
Mean daily minimum °C (°F)	19.3 (66.7)	19.7 (67.5)	21.2 (70.2)	22.7 (72.9)	23.4 (74.1)	23.1 (73.6)	22.7 (72.9)	22.7 (72.9)	22.7 (72.9)	22.6 (72.7)	21.6 (70.9)	20.2 (68.4)	21.8 (71.3)
Average precipitation mm (inches)	4 (0.2)	0 (0)	4 (0.2)	35 (1.4)	107 (4.2)	259 (10.2)	162 (6.4)	171 (6.7)	259 (10.2)	209 (8.2)	30 (1.2)	4 (0.2)	1,244 (49.1)
Source: Climate-Data.org

== See also ==
- La Aurora International Airport
- Tapachula International Airport
