= San Pablo, San Marcos =

San Pablo
- Municipality
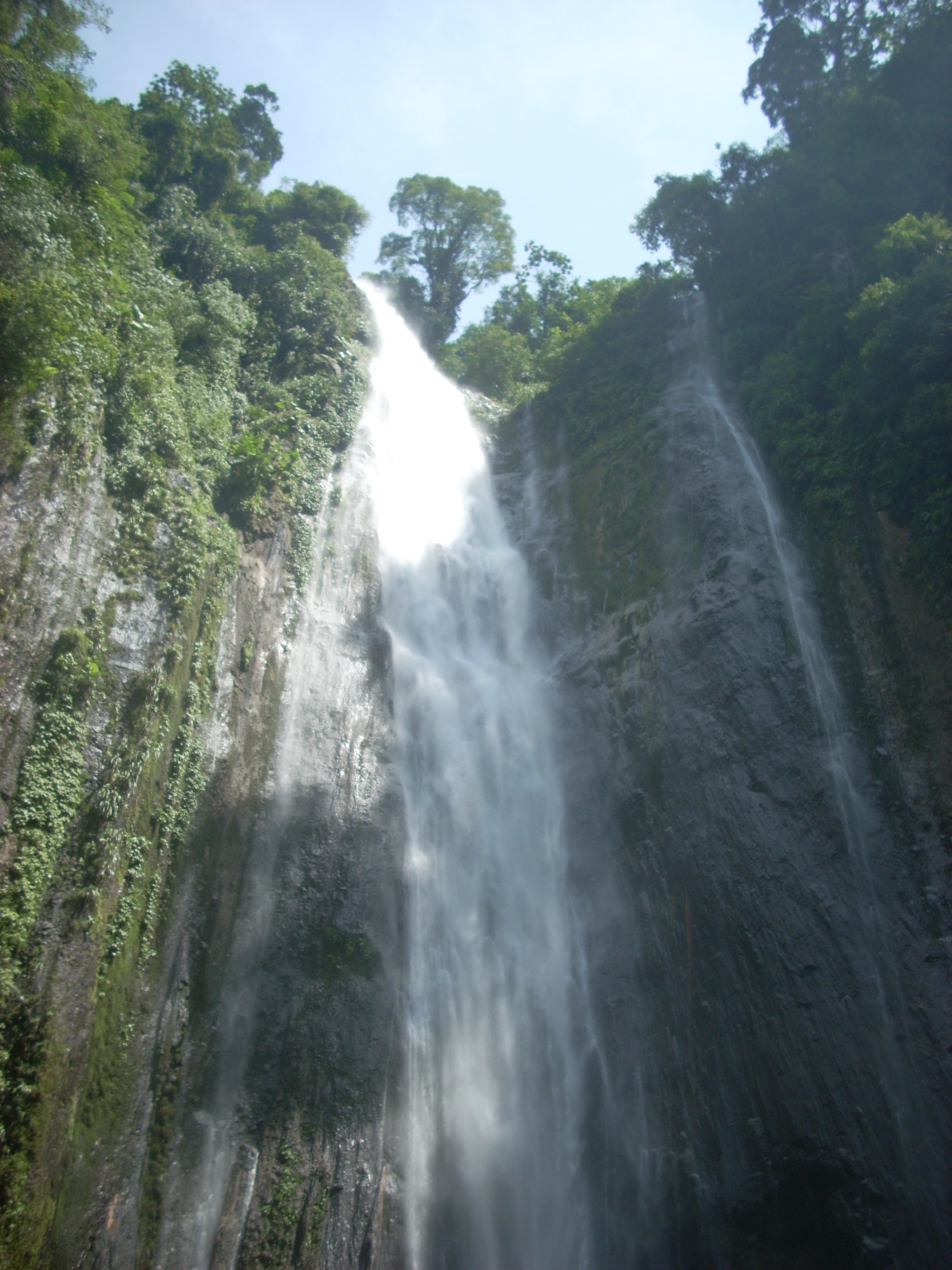
- La Igualdad waterfall, San Pablo.

- Location in Guatemala
- Coordinates: 14°56′00″N 92°00′00″W
- Country: Guatemala
- Department: San Marcos Department

Government
  - Mayor: Raúl Maldonado (URNG)

Area
  - Municipality: 55 sq mi (143 km^{2})

Population (2018 census)
  - Municipality: 48,937
  - Density: 886/sq mi (342/km^{2})
  - Urban: 16,768

San Pablo is a town and municipality in the San Marcos department of Guatemala.

== Climate ==
San Pablo has a tropical climate (Köppen: Am).

Climate data for San Pablo
Month	Jan	Feb	Mar	Apr	May	Jun	Jul	Aug	Sep	Oct	Nov	Dec	Year
Mean daily maximum °C (°F)	27.3 (81.1)	27.6 (81.7)	28.7 (83.7)	29.0 (84.2)	28.6 (83.5)	27.3 (81.1)	27.8 (82.0)	27.8 (82.0)	27.1 (80.8)	27.0 (80.6)	27.1 (80.8)	27.1 (80.8)	27.7 (81.9)
Daily mean °C (°F)	20.8 (69.4)	21.0 (69.8)	22.0 (71.6)	22.6 (72.7)	22.7 (72.9)	21.9 (71.4)	22.1 (71.8)	22.0 (71.6)	21.7 (71.1)	21.6 (70.9)	21.2 (70.2)	20.9 (69.6)	21.7 (71.1)
Mean daily minimum °C (°F)	14.3 (57.7)	14.5 (58.1)	15.4 (59.7)	16.3 (61.3)	16.8 (62.2)	16.6 (61.9)	16.4 (61.5)	16.3 (61.3)	16.4 (61.5)	16.3 (61.3)	15.4 (59.7)	14.7 (58.5)	15.8 (60.4)
Average precipitation mm (inches)	48 (1.9)	58 (2.3)	125 (4.9)	238 (9.4)	517 (20.4)	687 (27.0)	490 (19.3)	545 (21.5)	726 (28.6)	536 (21.1)	185 (7.3)	66 (2.6)	4,221 (166.3)
Source: Climate-Data.org

== Geographic location ==
San Pablo is surrounded by San Marcos Department municipalities:

== See also ==
- La Aurora International Airport
