= El Rodeo, San Marcos =

San José El Rodeo
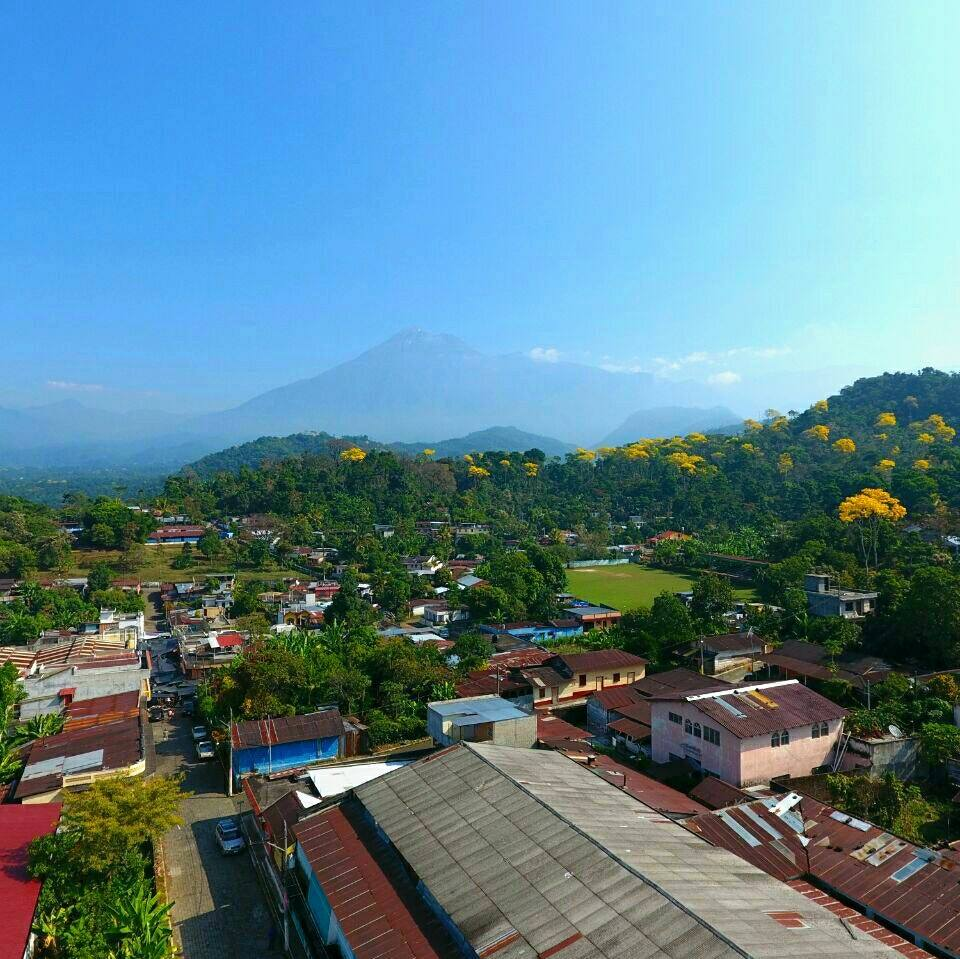

- Location in Guatemala
- Coordinates: 14°55′00″N 91°58′00″W
- Country: Guatemala
- Department: San Marcos

Government
  - Mayor: Wilde Joel Pérez (UNE)

El Rodeo (Spanish pronunciation: [el roˈðeo]) is a municipality in the San Marcos department of Guatemala, founded on 12 March 1834. Since 1954 it is known as San Jose el Rodeo.

== Geographic location ==
El Rodeo is surrounded by San Marcos Department municipalities.
