= La Blanca, San Marcos (municipality) =

Municipality in San Marcos, Guatemala

La Blanca
- Municipality
- Location in Guatemala
- Coordinates: 14°34′45″N 92°08′29″W
- Country: Guatemala
- Department: San Marcos

Government
  - Mayor (2016-2020): Aroldo Cordero (PP)

Area
  - Municipality: 96.1 km^{2} (37.1 sq mi)

Population (2018 census)
  - Municipality: 29,112
  - Density: 303/km^{2} (780/sq mi)
  - Urban: 13,921
- Climate: Aw

La Blanca is a municipality in the San Marcos department of Guatemala on the Pacific Ocean shore. It was created on 23 January 2014, when it was split from Ocos, along with Chiquirines and Pueblo Nuevo villages and became San Marcos Department thirtieth municipality. When created in 2014, La Blanca had about 25,000 inhabitants.

== Climate ==
La Blanca has tropical climate (Köppen:Cwb).

Climate data for La Blanca
Month	Jan	Feb	Mar	Apr	May	Jun	Jul	Aug	Sep	Oct	Nov	Dec	Year
Mean daily maximum °C (°F)	34.3 (93.7)	34.7 (94.5)	35.6 (96.1)	35.6 (96.1)	35.2 (95.4)	33.7 (92.7)	34.1 (93.4)	34.2 (93.6)	33.7 (92.7)	33.6 (92.5)	33.7 (92.7)	33.6 (92.5)	34.3 (93.8)
Daily mean °C (°F)	26.9 (80.4)	27.3 (81.1)	28.4 (83.1)	29.1 (84.4)	29.3 (84.7)	28.4 (83.1)	28.4 (83.1)	28.4 (83.1)	28.2 (82.8)	28.1 (82.6)	27.6 (81.7)	26.9 (80.4)	28.1 (82.5)
Mean daily minimum °C (°F)	19.5 (67.1)	19.9 (67.8)	21.3 (70.3)	22.7 (72.9)	23.5 (74.3)	23.1 (73.6)	22.8 (73.0)	22.7 (72.9)	22.8 (73.0)	22.7 (72.9)	21.6 (70.9)	20.3 (68.5)	21.9 (71.4)
Average precipitation mm (inches)	4 (0.2)	1 (0.0)	5 (0.2)	41 (1.6)	117 (4.6)	275 (10.8)	176 (6.9)	182 (7.2)	271 (10.7)	218 (8.6)	38 (1.5)	6 (0.2)	1,334 (52.5)
Source: Climate-Data.org

== Geographic location ==
La Blanca is located in Southern San Marcos, bordering the departments of Retalhuleu to the southeast, and Quetzaltenango to the northeast. In San Marcos, it borders Ocos to the northwest and the Pacific Ocean to the south.

== See also ==
- La Aurora International Airport
- Tapachula International Airport
