= Santa Bárbara, Huehuetenango =

Coordinates: 15.3167°N 91.6167°W

Santa Bárbara is a municipality in the Guatemalan department of Huehuetenango. Santa Bárbara may be the poorest municipality in the largely impoverished department. Elevations in the municipality range between 1500 meters and 3000 meters. Natural forest in the area has been obliterated by the constant quest for cooking fuel so land erosion is a major problem.
