= San Lorenzo, San Marcos =

San Lorenzo
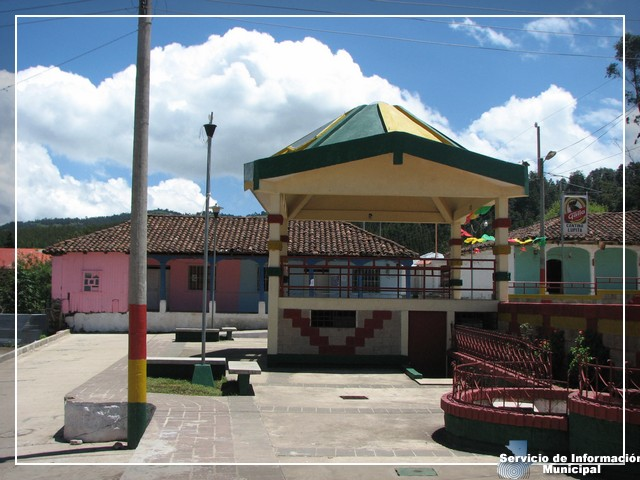

- Location in Guatemala
- Coordinates: 15°17′N 91°47′W
- Country: Guatemala
- Department: San Marcos

Government
  - Mayor (2016-2020): José Tema (LIDER)

Population (2021)
  - Total: 14,085
- Climate: Cwb

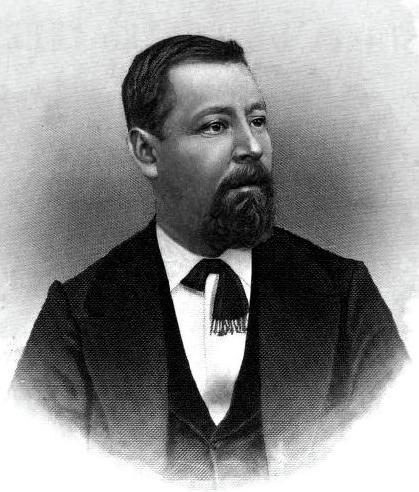
General Justo Rufino Barrios, President of Guatemala from 1873 to 1885, was born in San Lorenzo.

San Lorenzo (Spanish pronunciation: [san loˈɾenso]) is a municipality in the San Marcos department of Guatemala. It was founded in 1812 year by Spanish families.

This is the birthplace of Justo Rufino Barrios-who served as President of Guatemala from 1873 until his death in 1885 and whose native house has been declared as a National Heritage.

== Tourism ==
San Lorenzo's most representative historic landmark is "Justo Rufino Barrios" hacienda, birthplace of general Barrios and named National Heritage by the government.

== Climate ==
San Lorenzo has temperate climate (Köppen: Cwb).

Climate data for San Lorenzo
Month	Jan	Feb	Mar	Apr	May	Jun	Jul	Aug	Sep	Oct	Nov	Dec	Year
Mean daily maximum °C (°F)	17.2 (63.0)	17.6 (63.7)	19.1 (66.4)	19.8 (67.6)	19.4 (66.9)	18.5 (65.3)	18.4 (65.1)	18.9 (66.0)	18.3 (64.9)	17.7 (63.9)	17.8 (64.0)	17.5 (63.5)	18.4 (65.0)
Daily mean °C (°F)	9.8 (49.6)	10.0 (50.0)	11.4 (52.5)	12.7 (54.9)	13.7 (56.7)	13.6 (56.5)	13.4 (56.1)	13.3 (55.9)	13.4 (56.1)	12.7 (54.9)	11.5 (52.7)	10.7 (51.3)	12.2 (53.9)
Mean daily minimum °C (°F)	2.4 (36.3)	2.5 (36.5)	3.8 (38.8)	5.7 (42.3)	8.0 (46.4)	8.7 (47.7)	8.5 (47.3)	7.7 (45.9)	8.5 (47.3)	7.7 (45.9)	5.2 (41.4)	4.0 (39.2)	6.1 (42.9)
Average precipitation mm (inches)	5 (0.2)	6 (0.2)	19 (0.7)	58 (2.3)	179 (7.0)	248 (9.8)	176 (6.9)	207 (8.1)	262 (10.3)	174 (6.9)	26 (1.0)	10 (0.4)	1,370 (53.8)
Source: Climate-Data.org

== Geographic location ==
San Lorenzo has an area of 25 km^{2} (9.7 sq mi), which makes it one of the smallest municipalities of both San Marcos Department and Guatemala. It is located 23 km West of San Marcos, the department capital, and is surrounded by San Marcos municipalities.

== See also ==
- La Aurora International Airport
- Tapachula International Airport
