= Cuilco =

Municipality of Guatemala

Cuilco la perla escondida
- Municipality
- Location in Guatemala
- Coordinates: 15°24′25″N 91°56′45″W
- Country: Guatemala
- Department: Huehuetenango
- Municipality: Cuilco

Government
  - Type: Municipal

Area
  - Municipality: 592 km^{2} (229 sq mi)
- Elevation: 1,150 m (3,770 ft)
- Highest elevation: 3,300 m (10,800 ft)
- Lowest elevation: 1,000 m (3,300 ft)

Population (Census 2002)
  - Municipality: 46,407
  - Urban: 1,611
  - Ethnicities: Mam Ladino Tektitek
  - Religions: Roman Catholicism Evangelicalism Maya
- Climate: Am
- Website: http://www.inforpressca.com/cuilco/

Cuilco is a municipality in the Guatemalan department of Huehuetenango. It is located in the Cuchumatanes mountains in the south-western portion of Huehuetenango.

== Description ==
The municipality covers a total area of 592 square kilometres (229 sq mi). The dirt road connecting it to the Pan-American Highway has recently been improved and asphalted, which reduces travel times considerably. However, the highway ends at Cuilco, so travellers wishing to continue on to other parts of Guatemala or to Mexico must still navigate rough dirt roads. Given the poor condition of municipal roads, travel times may exceed eight hours from one side to the other. Cuilco, as the municipality's head town, contains the municipal government housed in the municipal building near the center plaza of town. As of 2007, the municipal building ("muni") employed about 15 people, providing many services to the surrounding villages and to Cuilco itself.

Export crops include corn, coffee and panela. Tourism to Cuilco is fairly limited given its location more than two hours from Huehuetenango.

== Demography ==
In 2018 the municipality served approximately 57,000 people, most of them Ladinos (who are ethnically Mam Maya), living in over 100 aldeas and caserios, which are smaller communities served by the municipality. While most of the population identifies as Ladino, this was not the case many years ago, when most people identified themselves as Mam Maya. Now it is mainly people living in Aldeas such as Aldea Cancuc, Aldea Chejoj, El Chilcal, and Aldea Shequemebaj who still identify as Maya. The majority of Cuilco speak Spanish, the Mam Maya language is not spoken as much as it used to be.

Since the civil war started affecting Cuilco in the 1980s, many Cuilquenses have migrated to the Mexican state of Chiapas, and to the United States, mainly Indiantown, Jupiter, West Palm Beach, Immokalee, and Fort Myers Florida, as well as Mississippi, Illinois, Morganton North Carolina, Ohio, Marydel Maryland, and to California.
