= Francisco Antonio de Fuentes y Guzmán =

Title page of Volume I of the 1882 edition of the Recordación Florida

Francisco Antonio de Fuentes y Guzmán (1643–1700) was a Guatemalan criollo historian and poet. His only surviving work is the Recordación Florida.

== Biography ==
Fuentes y Guzmán was born to a wealthy family in Santiago de los Caballeros de Guatemala (modern Antigua Guatemala) in 1643. He was the great-great-grandson of the conquistador Bernal Díaz del Castillo, historian of the Indies. Fuentes y Guzmán was a nobleman and a member of the ruling criollo caste. In 1661, at the age of eighteen, Fuentes y Guzmán was given the position of Regidor Perpetuo de Guatemala (permanent councillor on the town council of Santiago). At various times he served as magistrate (alcalde) in Santiago, and was later the alcalde mayor of Totonicapán, and then of Sonsonate. He worked many years as the Cronista del Ayuntamiento (Chronicler of the Municipal Government). He is thought to have died in Sonsonate in 1700.

=== Recordación Florida ===
The Recordación Florida, also called Historia de Guatemala (History of Guatemala), is Fuentes y Guzmán's only surviving work. It was the first Guatemalan history book written by a colonial Guatemalan author of Spanish descent. The first portion of the work, comprising the first sixteen books, was written by 1690. Fuentes y Guzmán sent it to Spain in apparently the vain hope of being named as Chronicler of the Kingdom of Guatemala. He continued writing the work, with the addition of a seventeenth book to the first part, and a second part comprising 14 more books. The Recordación Florida regarded as one of the most important works of Guatemalan history. In the book, he describes the customs and rites of indigenous people, the Spanish conquest of Guatemala, and notable facts in the history of Guatemala until the 17th century.

The incomplete first part of the Recordación Florida was published in Madrid in 1882-1883. The complete text was stored in the archive of the Municipality of Guatemala, and was published in Guatemala in 1932-1933. Large portions of the work were reproduced in the writing of diocesan priest Domingo de Juarros, published in the early 19th century.

== Other works ==
- El Milagro de América, describing the inauguration of the Catedral de Guatemala
- La Vida de Santa Teresa de Jesús, describing the festivities in Guatemala when King Carlos II of Spain turned 13
- La Cinosura Política o Ceremonial de Guatemala.
- El Norte Político.
