= Almolonga =

Stratovolcano in Guatemala

Almolonga volcano
- (Cerro Quemado)
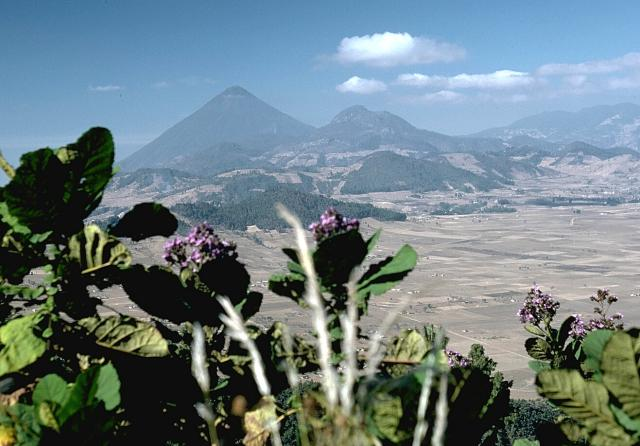
- The rounded hills in the middle, are part of a chain of lava domes of the Almolonga volcanic field

Highest point
- Elevation: 3,197 m (10,489 ft)
- Coordinates: 14°48′0″N 91°31′12″W

Geography
- Location within Guatemala
- Location: Quetzaltenango, Guatemala
- Parent range: Sierra Madre

Geology
- Mountain type: Stratovolcano
- Volcanic arc: Central America Volcanic Arc
- Last eruption: January to June 1818

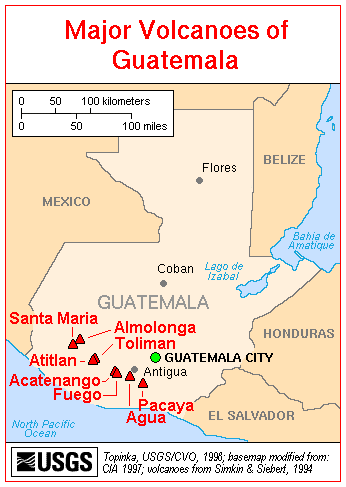
Major Volcanoes of Guatemala

The Almolonga volcano, also called "Cerro Quemado" (Burned Mountain) or "La Muela" (The Molar) due to its distinct shape, is an andesitic stratovolcano in the south-western department of Quetzaltenango in Guatemala. Part of the mountain range of the Sierra Madre, the volcano is located near the town of Almolonga, just south of Quetzaltenango, Guatemala's second largest city.

The volcano is set along the Zunil fault zone and has a central caldera surrounded by several dacitic and rhyolitic lava domes and formed in a back-arc volcanic setting, with activity commencing 84,000BP. Almolonga stratovolcano is the oldest edifice and underwent collapse prior to the caldera forming eruption of Lake Atitlan, the major chronological marker of volcanism in the region. The collapse of the stratovolcano left a caldera with a diameter of 3,3 km and a depth of 350m that was subsequently occupied by lava domes on its northern edge and covered by tephra layers from numerous volcanoes, both in the Almolonga field and others. Cerro Quemado is the largest (about 2 km^{3}) and youngest lava dome complex formed by eight vents with viscous lava flows and plugs during four distinct volcanic phases - the first two involving effusion of lava and formation of new domes. Cerro Quemado underwent a flank collapse 1,150BP, generating a landslide that went 6 km SSW in the Llano de Pinal valley and occupied an area of 13 km^{2}, generating a lateral blast that affected the neighbouring Volcán Siete Orejas volcano as well. A lava dome emerged inside the collapse scar subsequently. 1818 an eruption formed a block lava flow over half a year that travelled 2.5 km eastward. Lahars and further explosive activity are potential hazards from this volcano.

== Hydrothermal Activity and Thermal Springs ==
The active geothermal system of the Almolonga volcanic complex is driven by residual magmatic heat from the underlying magma chamber, which heats percolating meteoric waters along the Zunil fault zone. This active hydrothermal network manifests through high-temperature thermal springs, fumaroles, and mineralized waters rich in sulfur, silica, and bicarbonate compounds along the southern and eastern flanks of Cerro Quemado. The most prominent hydrothermal sites surrounding the volcanic field include the mountain hot springs of Fuentes Georginas and the thermal baths of Almolonga

Hydrothermal Manifestations of the Almolonga Volcanic Field
Thermal Site / Complex	Geomorphological Location	Physicochemical & Geothermal Features
Fuentes Georginas	Southeastern flank of Cerro Quemado, embedded in humid cloud forest ravine.	Sulfur and silica-rich thermal waters emerging at temperatures between 38 °C and 42 °C; fed directly by volcanic fumarolic heating along structural faults.
Baños de Almolonga (Cirilo Flores)	Valley floor of the Almolonga River, south of Quetzaltenango.	Bicarbonate-rich hot springs with temperatures ranging from 35 °C to 45 °C; historically utilized for balneotherapy.
Los Baños / El Rosario Springs	Northern periphery of the Almolonga caldera along the Zunil fault zone.	Low-to-moderate enthalpy thermal discharges utilized for local thermal baths and greenhouse soil heating.

== See also ==
- List of volcanoes in Guatemala
