= Samalá River =

River in Guatemala

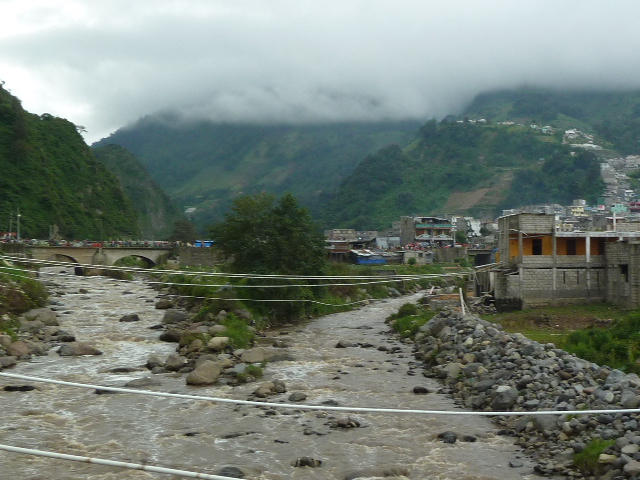
- The Samalá River at Zunil

- Location of mouth

Location
- Country: Guatemala

Physical characteristics
- Source
  - location: Sierra Madre in the Valle De Écija, San Carlos Sija
  - coordinates: 15.034759°N 91.572847°W
  - elevation: 3,200 m (10,500 ft)
- Mouth
  - location: Pacific Ocean
  - coordinates: 14.191934°N 91.785450°W
  - elevation: 0 m (0 ft)
- Length: 145 km (90 mi)
- Discharge
  - average: 8.7 m^{3}/s (310 cu ft/s) (Candelaria)

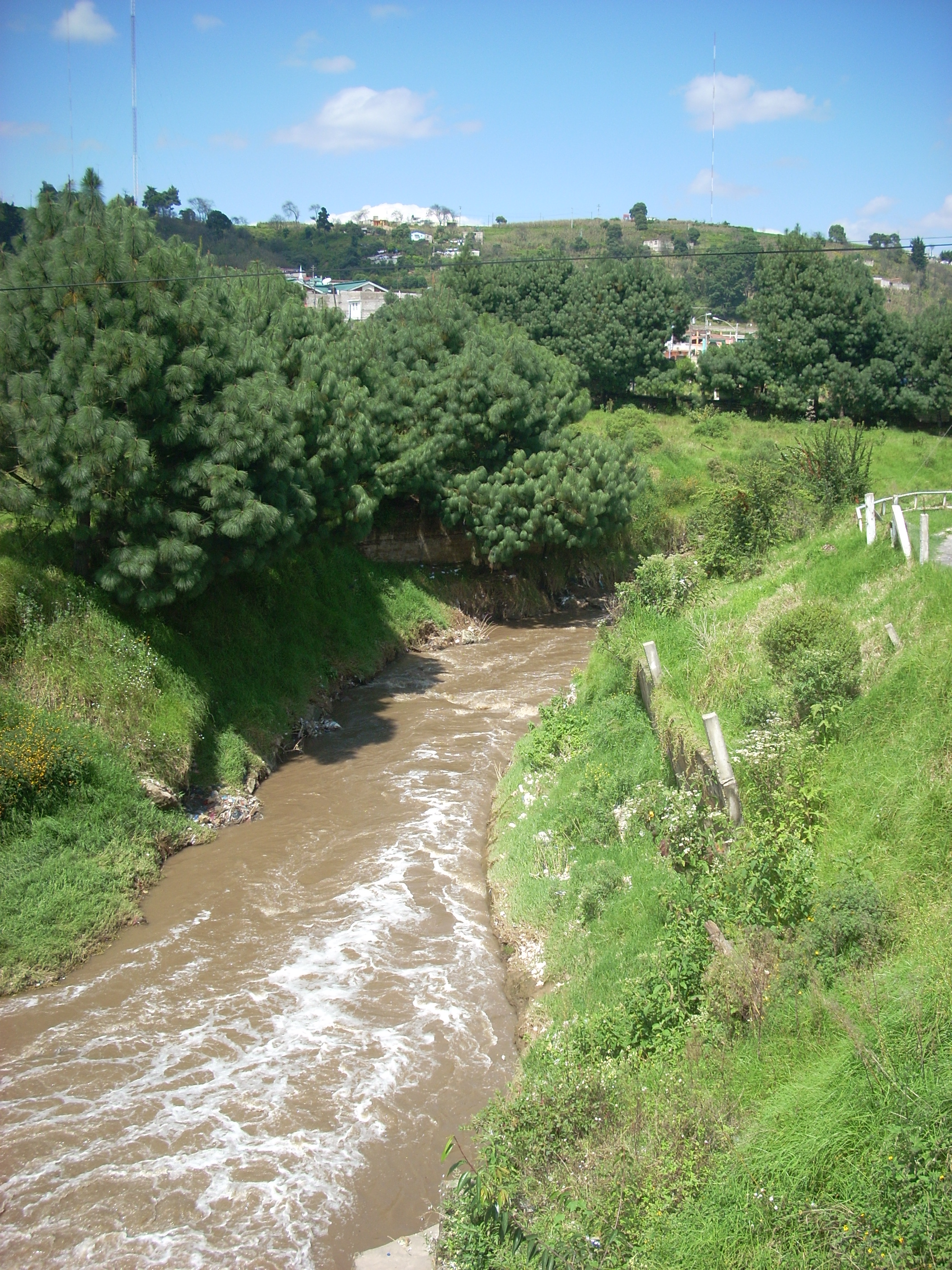
The Samalá River on the outskirts of Quetzaltenango city

The Samalá is a river in southwestern Guatemala. Its sources are in the Sierra Madre, Valle De Écija range, in the departments of Quetzaltenango and Totonicapán. From there it flows down, past the towns San Carlos Sija in the Valle De Écija, Quetzaltenango, San Cristóbal Totonicapán, Quetzaltenango, El Palmar and Zunil, through the coastal plains of Retalhuleu into the Pacific Ocean.

The Samalá river basin covers a territory of 1,510 km² (580 sq ml) and has a population of around 0.4 million people. Its proximity to the active Santa Maria and Santiaguito volcano complex, with its recurring lava and lahars flows, leads to a heightened risk of serious flooding.
