= Chicabal =

Volcano and lake in Quetzaltenango, Guatemala

Chicabal Volcano
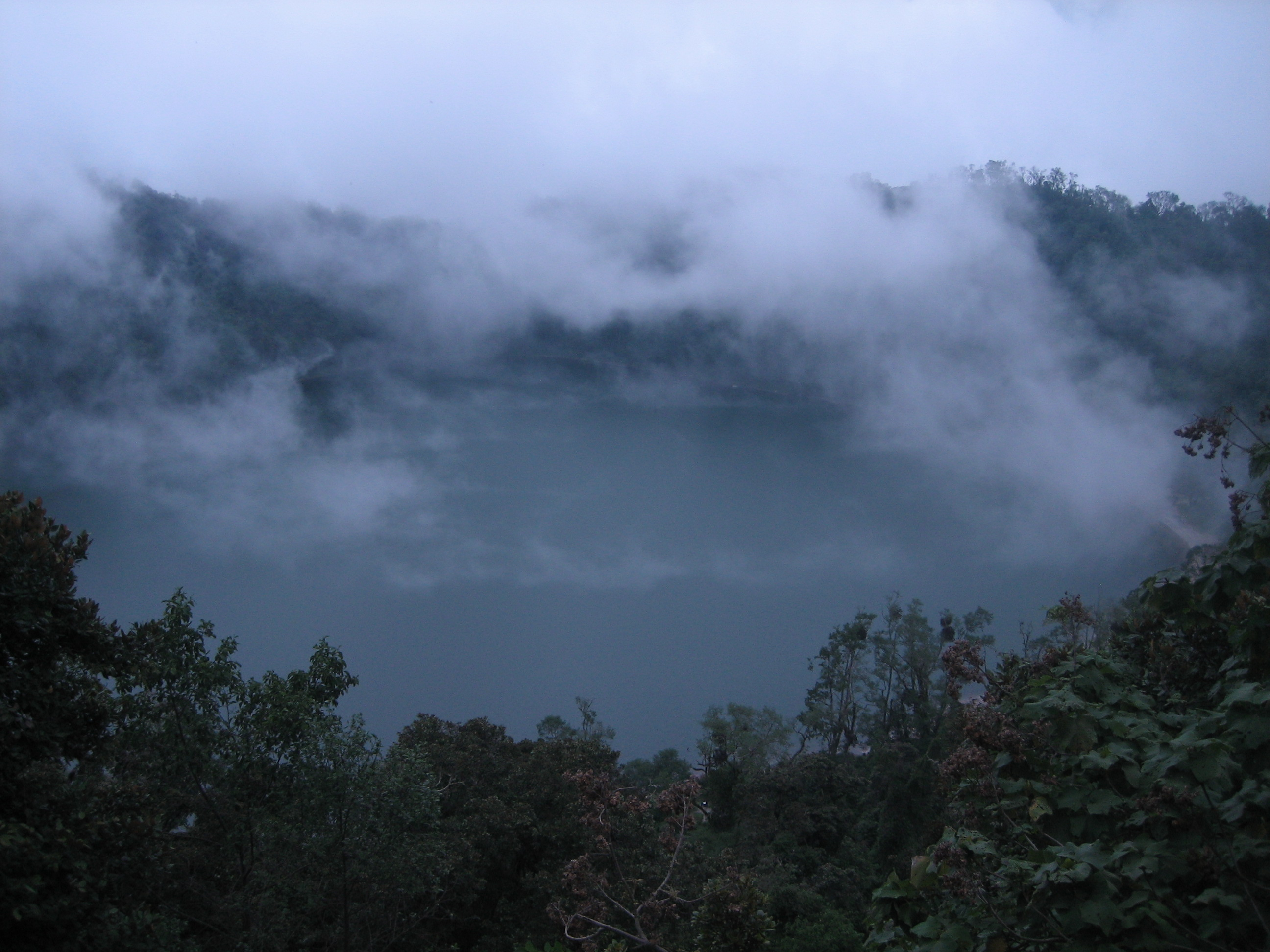
- Lake Chicabal situated within the volcano's crater.

Highest point
- Elevation: 2,900 m (9,500 ft)
- Coordinates: 14°47′00″N 91°40′00″W

Geography
- Location within Guatemala
- Location: San Martín Sacatepéquez, Quetzaltenango, Guatemala
- Parent range: Sierra Madre de Chiapas

Geology
- Mountain type: Stratovolcano
- Last eruption: Extinct

Chicabal Volcano is an extinct stratovolcano and protected area located in the municipality of San Martín Sacatepéquez, in the Quetzaltenango Department of Guatemala. The volcano is renowned for the Chicabal Lake (Spanish: Laguna de Chicabal), a crater lake that lies within its caldera. The site holds significant ecological importance and is considered a sacred location in Mayan cosmovision.

== Geography and Geology ==
Part of the Sierra Madre de Chiapas mountain range, the volcano reaches an elevation of 2,900 metres (9,500 ft) above sea level. The crater has a diameter of approximately 575 metres (1,886 ft).

The lake at the bottom is known for its emerald-green waters. A unique meteorological phenomenon occurs almost daily: after midday, a thick fog descends into the crater and covers the lake completely, only clearing sporadically. This environment supports a lush cloud forest ecosystem.

== Cultural and Spiritual Significance ==
The volcano and its lake are central to the spiritual life of the Mam people (a Maya group). In the Mam language, "Chicabal" is often translated as "Sweet Spirit Water" or "Place of Good Blood."

According to local tradition, the site is protected by nahuales (spiritual guardians). Due to its sacred status, the volcano is a major site for traditional Mayan ceremonies, particularly during the "Ascension of the Lord" (40 days after Easter), when prayers for rain are offered.

Out of respect for the sacred nature of the site and to preserve water purity, swimming in the lake is strictly prohibited.

== Flora and Fauna ==
The area is designated as a cultural monument and natural reserve by the National Council of Protected Areas (CONAP).

- Flora: The forest is dominated by oak, pine, and cypress trees, as well as numerous epiphytes, including orchids, bromeliads, and mosses.
- Fauna: The reserve provides habitat for endemic birds such as the Resplendent quetzal, the Horned guan, and various hummingbird species.

== Tourism ==
Chicabal is a popular destination for hiking and ecotourism. On clear days, the volcano's viewpoint offers panoramic views of the Tacaná and Tajumulco volcanoes to the west, as well as the Santa María and Santiaguito volcanoes.

Access involves a hike from the town of San Martín Sacatepéquez, including a descent of over 500 steps from the crater rim to the lakeshore.

== See also ==
- List of volcanoes in Guatemala
- Central America Volcanic Arc
