= Sibilia =

Sibilia may refer to:

- Enrico Sibilia (1861-1948), Italian Roman Catholic cardinal
- Sydney Sibilia (born 1981), Italian film director, producer, and screenwriter
- Carlo Sibilia (born 1986), Italian politician
- Laura Sibilia, American politician
- Sibilia, Quetzaltenango, a municipality in Guatemala
- Sibilia, an Italian Navy corvette involved in the Tragedy of Otranto, a 1997 collision
- Sibília, a Medieval Catalan name for the city of Seville, Spain

== See also ==
- Sibila of Fortia (died 1406), Queen of Aragon
