= Palestina de Los Altos =

- Municipality and town
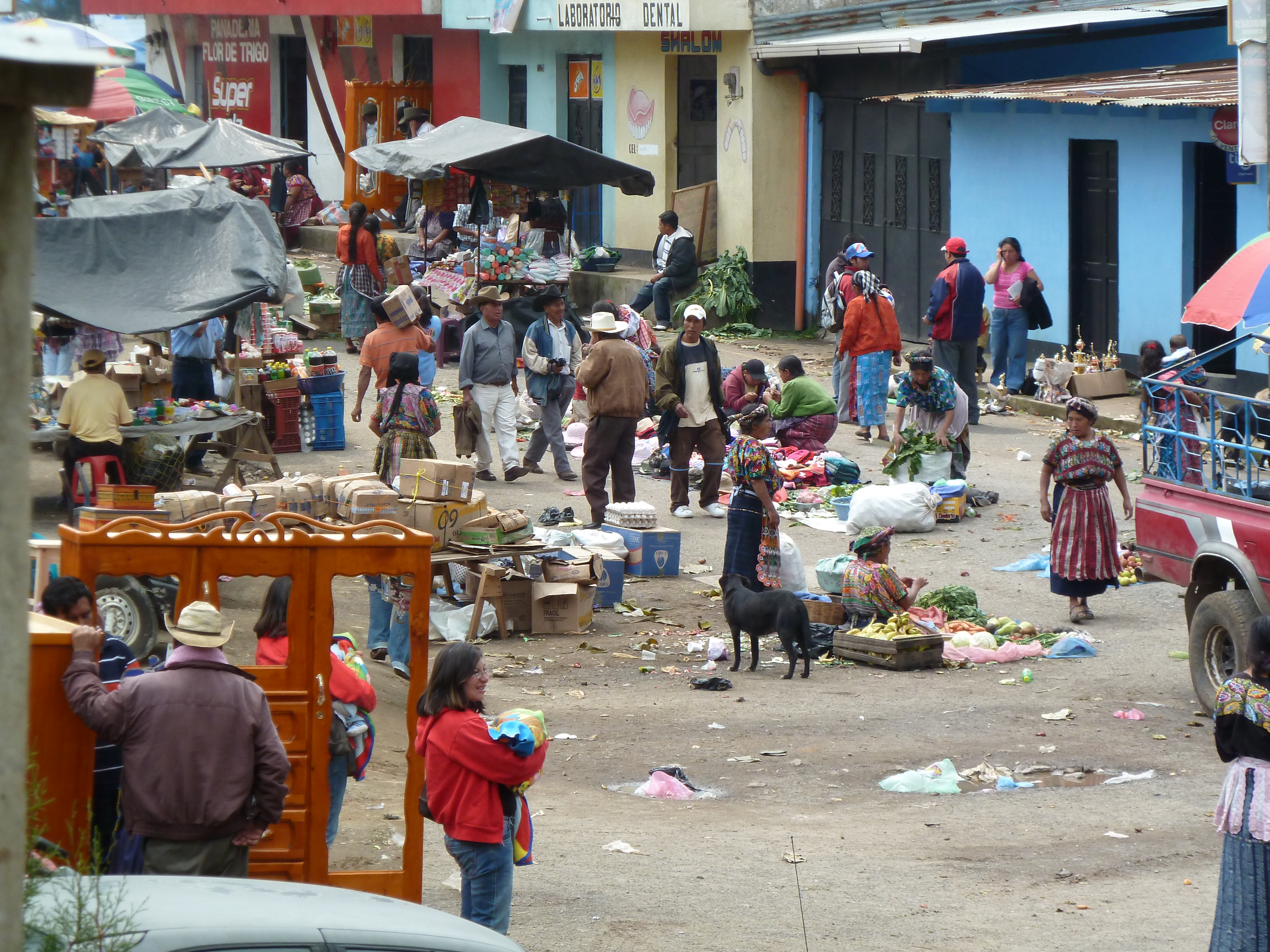
- Market scene in Palestina

- Location within Guatemala
- Coordinates: 14°56′0″N 91°41′40″W
- Country: Guatemala
- Department: Quetzaltenango

Area
  - Total: 8.5 sq mi (22 km^{2})
- Time zone: UTC+6 (Central Time)
- Climate: Cwb

Palestina de Los Altos (English: Palestine of the Highlands) is a municipality in the Quetzaltenango department of Guatemala. Its inhabitants speak Mam and Spanish.

Palestina de los Altos was originally called Toj Suj. It is located between San Juan Ostuncalco and San Marcos.

The land is mainly used for farming, primarily corn and potatoes, and pasture.

== Organization ==
Township

- Nueva Linda
- El Socorro
- Los Gonzáles
- Los Méndez
- Los Peñalonzo
- Roble Grande
- El Campo
- Alta Mira
- Los López
- Los Díaz
- Los Cabrera
- La Feria
- Los Morales
- Los Molinos

Hamlet El Carmen

- Los Miranda
- La Joya
- Nuevo Palmira
- El Centro del Carmen
- Toj Wabill
- El Carmen II
- El Toj Pic

Hamlet San José Buena Vista

- Los González
- Los Marroquín
- La Cumbre
- El Centro de San José Buena Vista
- Los Gómez
- Los Pérez
- Cruz Verde
- Toj Choll (Cruz del Mexicano)

Hamlet El Edén

- Mira Peña
- Las Delicias
- Buenos Aires
- Centro del Edén
- El Sinaí
- Los Desiertos
- Los Laureles
  - Cantón Barrios

== Climate ==
Palestina de los Altos has a cold subtropical highland climate (Cwb) with dry winters and rainy summers.

Climate data for Palestina de los Altos
Month	Jan	Feb	Mar	Apr	May	Jun	Jul	Aug	Sep	Oct	Nov	Dec	Year
Mean daily maximum °C (°F)	16.5 (61.7)	17.0 (62.6)	18.5 (65.3)	19.2 (66.6)	18.8 (65.8)	18.0 (64.4)	17.8 (64.0)	18.3 (64.9)	17.8 (64.0)	17.1 (62.8)	17.1 (62.8)	16.8 (62.2)	17.7 (63.9)
Daily mean °C (°F)	9.1 (48.4)	9.4 (48.9)	10.8 (51.4)	12.2 (54.0)	13.2 (55.8)	13.2 (55.8)	12.9 (55.2)	12.8 (55.0)	13.0 (55.4)	12.2 (54.0)	10.8 (51.4)	10.1 (50.2)	11.6 (53.0)
Mean daily minimum °C (°F)	1.7 (35.1)	1.9 (35.4)	3.2 (37.8)	5.3 (41.5)	7.7 (45.9)	8.4 (47.1)	8.1 (46.6)	7.3 (45.1)	8.2 (46.8)	7.3 (45.1)	4.6 (40.3)	3.4 (38.1)	5.6 (42.1)
Average rainfall mm (inches)	6 (0.2)	6 (0.2)	18 (0.7)	57 (2.2)	192 (7.6)	261 (10.3)	185 (7.3)	217 (8.5)	291 (11.5)	182 (7.2)	27 (1.1)	9 (0.4)	1,451 (57.2)
Source: Climate-Data.org
