= San Francisco La Unión =

Coordinates: 14°55′N 91°32′W

San Francisco La Unión (Spanish pronunciation: [saɱ fɾanˈsisko lawˈnjon]) is a municipality in the Quetzaltenango department of Guatemala, known for its large market. It has five cantones : Centro, Pala, Paxan, Xeaj, Chuistancia and Tzanjuyup and also they celebrate the 4 de Octubre in honor to San Francisco de ASIS where, they have parade from all the schools that they are in.

San Francisco La Union celebrates its yearly dance from January 15 until January 18. This town was founded in 1883. All La Union descendants are from San Francisco El Alto Totonicapan Place that Belong to Other Departament "State" Of Guatemala.

As of January 15, 2024, the mayor of San Francisco La Union is Francisco Gonzalez of the Guatemalan National Revolutionary Unity.
