= Génova, Quetzaltenango =

Génova
- Municipality and town
- Location within Guatemala
- Coordinates: 14°37′N 91°50′W
- Country: Guatemala
- Department: Quetzaltenango

Area
  - Total: 144 sq mi (372 km^{2})
- Time zone: UTC+6 (Central Time)
- Climate: Am

Génova (Spanish pronunciation: [ˈxenoβa]) is a municipality in the Quetzaltenango department of Guatemala.
