= Cabricán =

- Municipality and town
- Location within Guatemala
- Coordinates: 15°04′29″N 91°38′55″W
- Country: Guatemala
- Department: Quetzaltenango

Area
  - Municipality and town: 90.8 km^{2} (35.1 sq mi)
- Elevation: 2,525 m (8,284 ft)

Population (2018 census)
  - Municipality and town: 23,033
  - Density: 254/km^{2} (657/sq mi)
  - Urban: 6,998
- Time zone: UTC+6 (Central Time)
- Climate: Cwb
- Website: www.inforpressca.com/cabrican/

Cabricán is a town and municipality in the Quetzaltenango department of Guatemala. The head town of Cabricán is situated at an altitude of 2,525 m above sea level.

Cabrican is the location of Roman Catholic radio station Radio Mam. The station primarily broadcasts in the Mam language.
