= San Mateo, Quetzaltenango =

Coordinates: 14.8667°N 91.5833°W

San Mateo
- Municipality
- Interactive map of San Mateo
- Country: Guatemala
- Department: Quetzaltenango

Area
  - Municipality: 9.38 km^{2} (3.62 sq mi)

Population (2018 census)
  - Municipality: 7,895
  - Density: 842/km^{2} (2,180/sq mi)
  - Urban: 7,719

San Mateo is a town and municipality in the Quetzaltenango department of Guatemala.
