= Colomba, Quetzaltenango =

Colomba
- Municipality and town
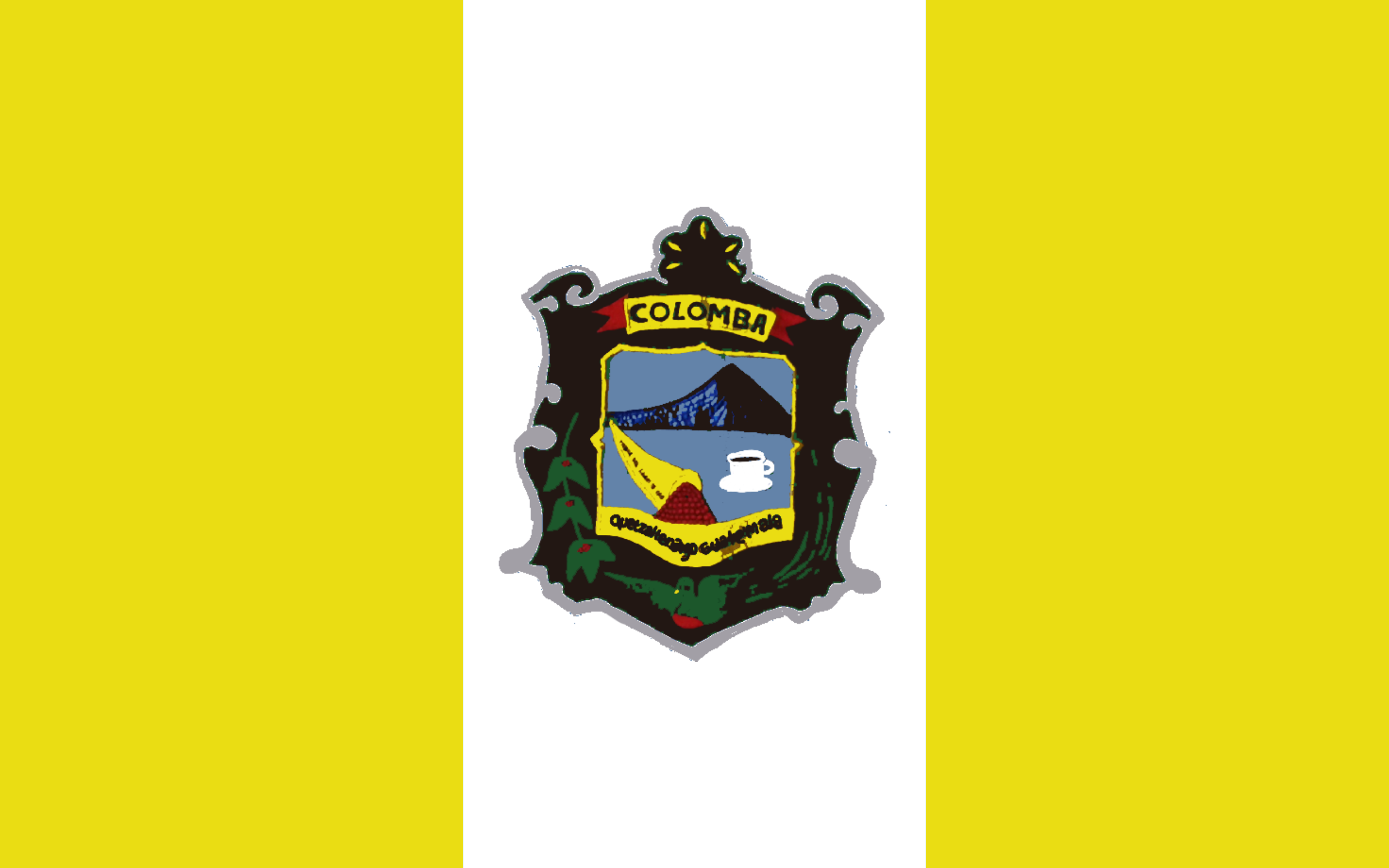
- Flag

- Location within Guatemala
- Coordinates: 14°43′N 91°44′W
- Country: Guatemala
- Department: Quetzaltenango

Area
  - Total: 83 sq mi (214 km^{2})

Population (2018 census)
  - Total: 47,544
  - Density: 575/sq mi (222/km^{2})
- Time zone: UTC–6 (Central Time)
- Climate: Am

Colomba is a town, with a population of 57,111 (2023 census), and a municipality in the Quetzaltenango department of Guatemala with an area of 214 km^{2} at an altitude of about 1011 metres.
