= Huitán =

- Municipality and town
- Location within Guatemala
- Coordinates: 15°06′N 91°37′W
- Country: Guatemala
- Department: Quetzaltenango
- Time zone: UTC+6 (Central Time)
- Climate: Cwb

Huitán (Spanish pronunciation: [wiˈtan]) is a municipality in the Quetzaltenango department of Guatemala, situated on 16 km^{2} at 2600 m altitude, North-West from Quetzaltenango.
