= Chicabal Lake =

Crater lake in Quetzaltenango, Guatemala

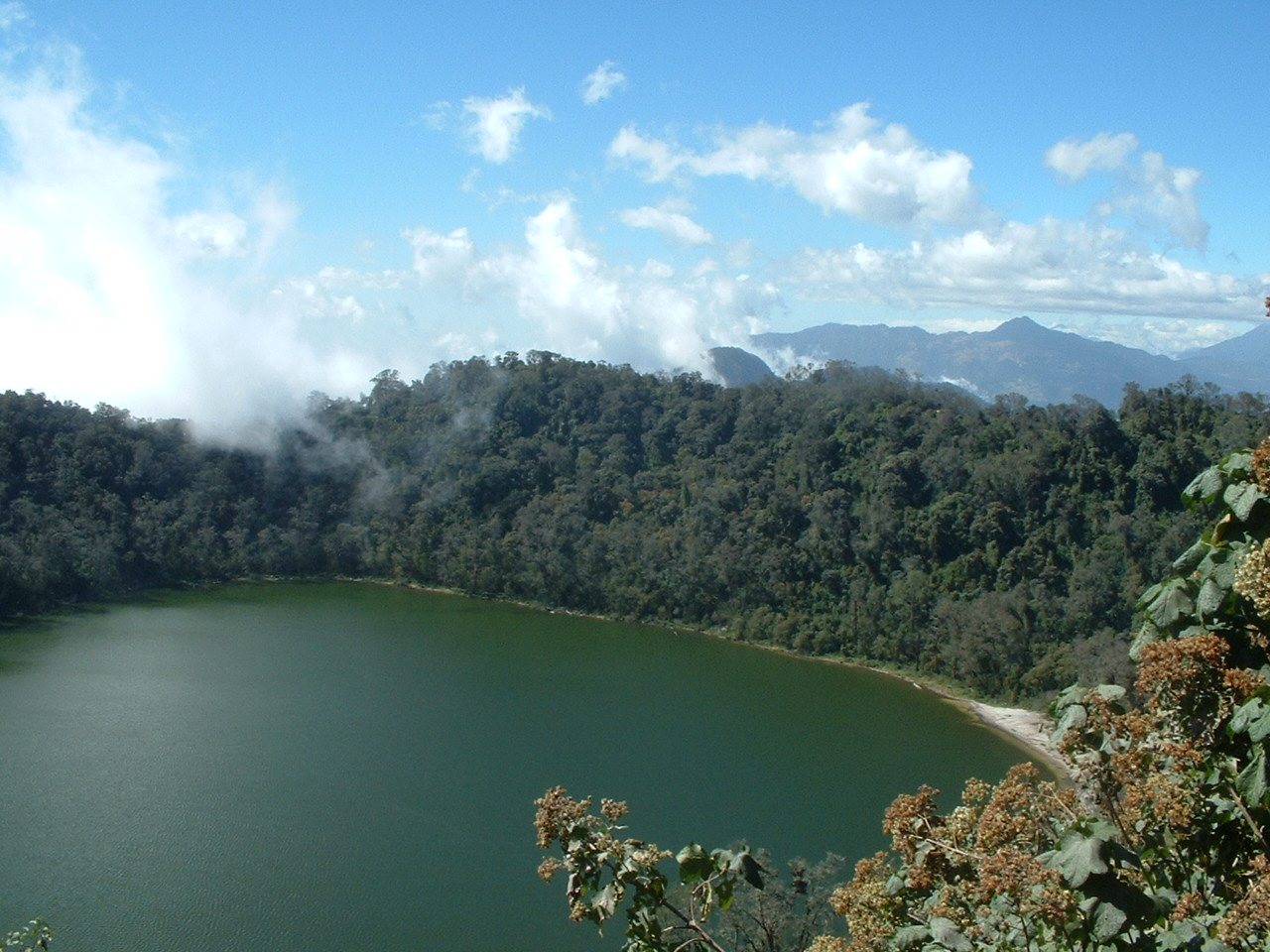

- Location within Guatemala
- Location: Quetzaltenango
- Coordinates: 14°47′15″N 91°39′21″W
- Type: Crater lake
- Basin countries: Guatemala
- Max. width: 575 m (1,886 ft)
- Max. depth: 331 m (1,086 ft)
- Surface elevation: 2,172 m (7,126 ft)

Chicabal Lake (Spanish: Laguna de Chicabal) is a Guatemalan lake sacred to the Mam Mayan people. The lake is located in the municipal boundary of the town of San Martín Sacatepéquez in the department of Quetzaltenango. A crater lake, Chicabal Lake was formed in the crater of Volcán Chicabal at an elevation of 2,712 meters (8,879 feet). The terrain surrounding the lake is a cloud forest.

Chicabal Lake is billed as the center of the Mam-Maya "cosmovision", and Mayan traditionalists still use the several altars on the lake shore. Restrictions are placed on visiting the lake during early May so that Mam people can celebrate their traditional ceremonies without disturbance. Because of its spiritual importance, swimming is prohibited in Chicabal Lake.
