= Flores Costa Cuca =

- Municipality
- Location within Guatemala
- Coordinates: 14°39′N 91°49′W
- Country: Guatemala
- Department: Quetzaltenango

Area
  - Municipality: 23.6 sq mi (61.1 km^{2})

Population (2018 census)
  - Municipality: 21,630
  - Density: 917/sq mi (354/km^{2})
  - Urban: 9,008
- Time zone: UTC+6 (Central Time)
- Climate: Am

Flores Costa Cuca is a town and municipality in the Quetzaltenango department of Guatemala. The municipality covers an area of 61.1 km^{2}, is situated at an average altitude of 540 metres above sea level and has a population of 21,630.
