= Cajolá =

- Municipality and town

- Location within Guatemala
- Coordinates: 14°55′N 91°37′W
- Country: Guatemala
- Department: Quetzaltenango

Area
  - Municipality and town: 8.6 sq mi (22.3 km^{2})

Population (2018 census)
  - Municipality and town: 14,948
  - Density: 1,740/sq mi (670/km^{2})
  - Urban: 14,948
- Time zone: UTC+6 (Central Time)
- Climate: Cwb

Cajolá is a town and municipality in the Quetzaltenango department of Guatemala. In 2023, the municipality of Cajolá had a population of 19,547, 8,776 males to 10,771 females.
