= Volcán Siete Orejas =

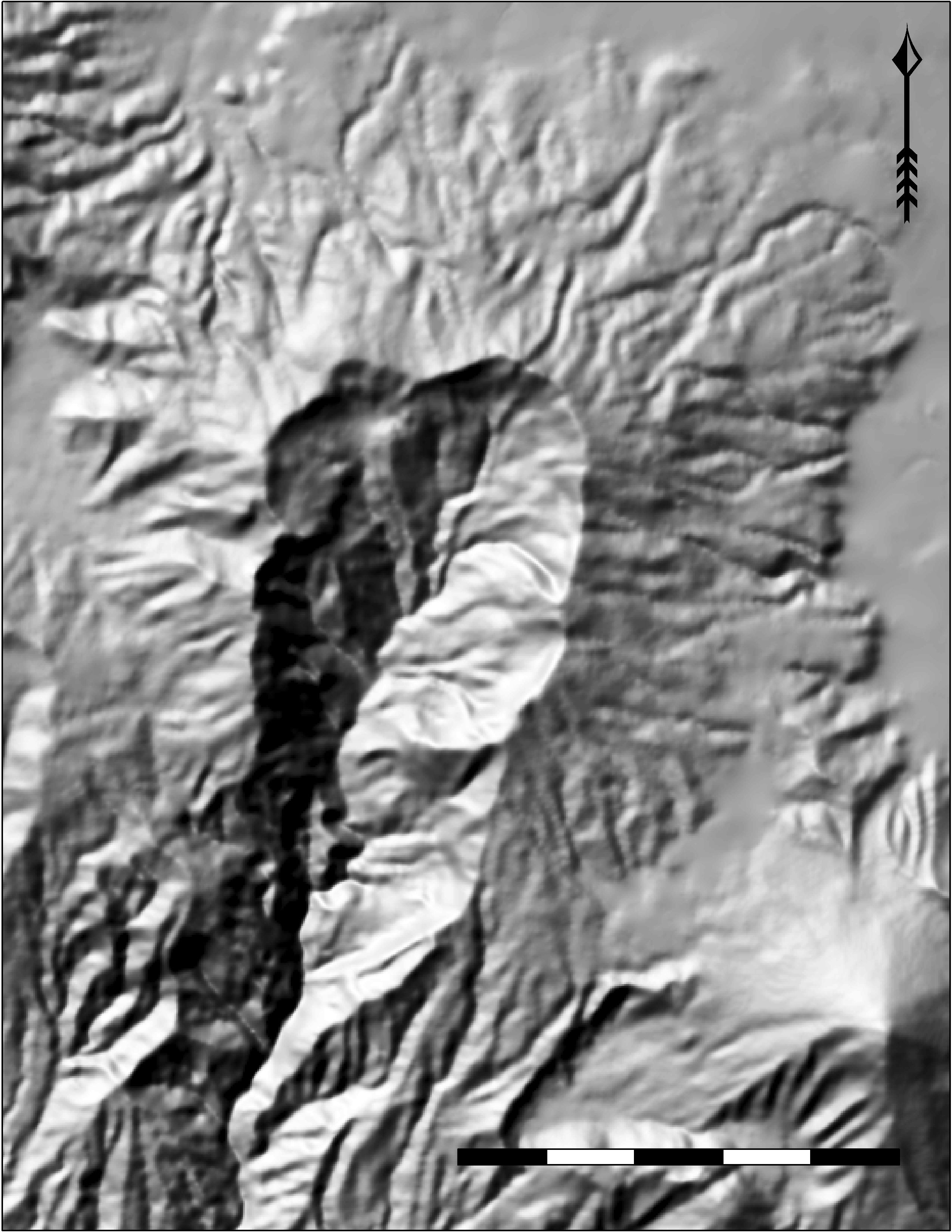
- Relief map of Volcán Siete Orejas with Volcán Santa Maria to the SE. (Unit of scale bar is 1 km per section)

Highest point
- Elevation: 3,370 m (11,060 ft)
- Coordinates: 14°48′53″N 91°37′04″W

Geography
- Location within Guatemala
- Location: Quetzaltenango, Concepción Chiquirichapa, Guatemala

Geology
- Mountain type: Stratovolcano
- Volcanic arc: Central America Volcanic Arc
- Last eruption: Unknown

Volcán Siete Orejas (Mam: Wuq Xinkan) is a stratovolcano in Guatemala located within the Quetzaltenango Department, in the municipalities of Quetzaltenango, Concepción Chiquirichapa, La Esperanza, and San Martin Sacatepequez. It is in the Sierra Madre de Chiapas.

== Geography ==
The volcano has 7 peaks, set around a large crater of which the southern side appears to have collapsed. The highest peaks are located on the north-west side and have an elevation of 3,370 metres (11,060 ft) and 3,157 metres (10,358 ft).

The U-shaped volcanic edifice opens south towards the coastal piedmont, creating both cold and temperate climatic zones within a relatively small area. Within the edifice are hot springs as well as the headwaters of the rio Ocosito which flows into the Pacific Ocean.

== Ecological significance ==
The volcano forms part of the Sierra Madre, hosting an abundance of endemic species such as the endangered Guatemalan Fir or "Pinabete" (Abies guatemalensis) and forming an integral part of one of the largest contiguous biological corridors of southwestern Guatemala. Bird species include the pink-headed warbler, black-capped siskin, highland guan, rufous-collared robin, white-breasted hawk, and rufous-browed wren.

== Cultural significance ==
The volcano's ridgeline houses over 18 Mayan ceremonial altars, most of which are still actively used by local Mayan priests. The name Siete Orejas originates from the local name in the Mam language: Wuq Xinkan. According to locals, this name originated from a legend about a large boulder on one of the peaks.

== Recreational opportunities ==
On clear days the ridgeline of the volcano has wide views of the surrounding area, from the city of Quetzaltenango, to San Marcos and the coastal piedmont, including views of volcanoes Santa Maria, Santiaguito, Tajumulco, and Tacana. In 2009 the municipality of Concepción Chiquirichapa founded the Regional Ecological Park "Cacique Dormido" which offers hiking, camping, bird-watching, and cultural tours on the volcano.

== Gallery ==
Siete Orejas Volcano
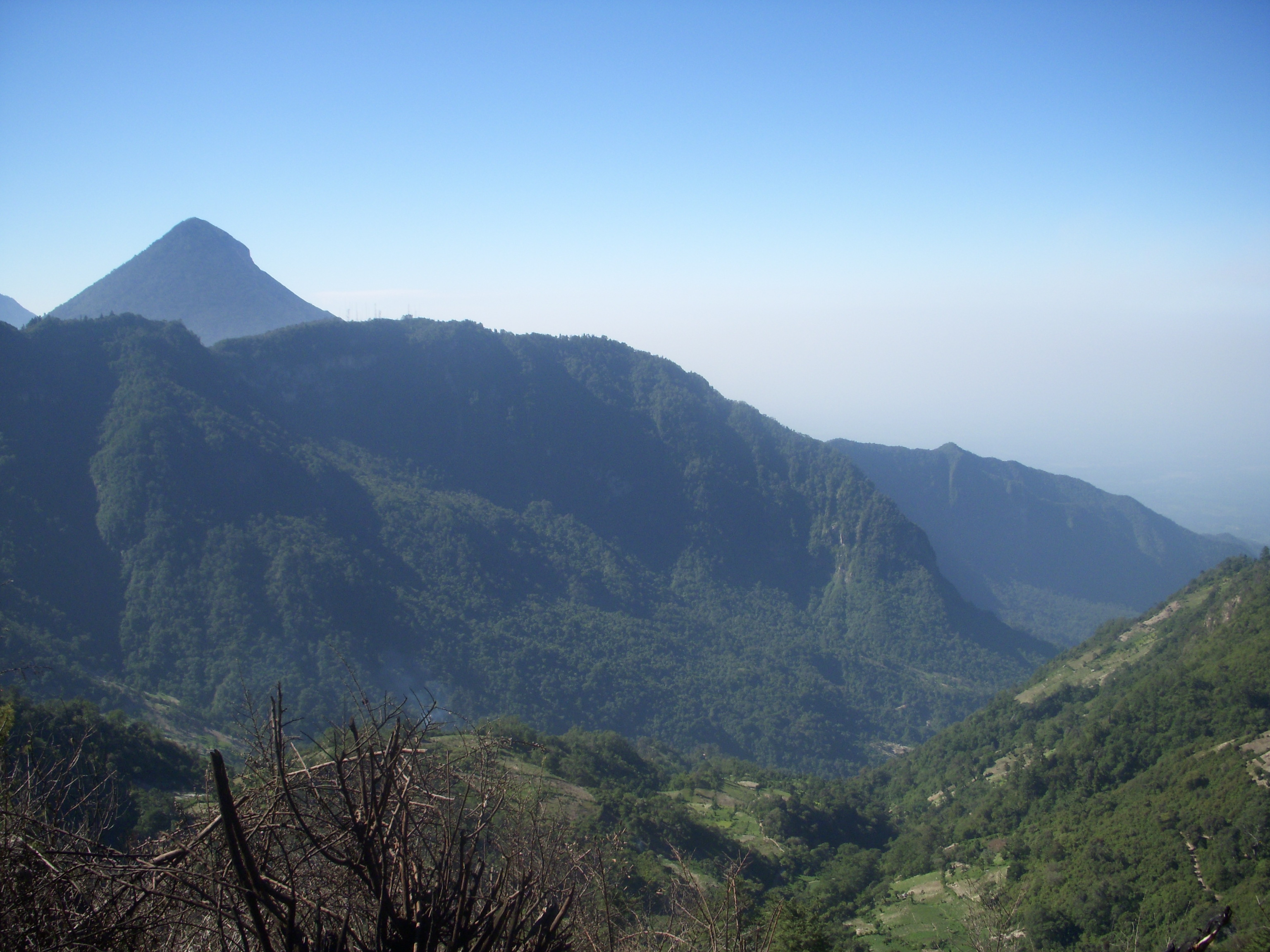
Looking from the ridgeline down into the old volcanic edifice, with the peak of Volcan Santa Maria in the background.

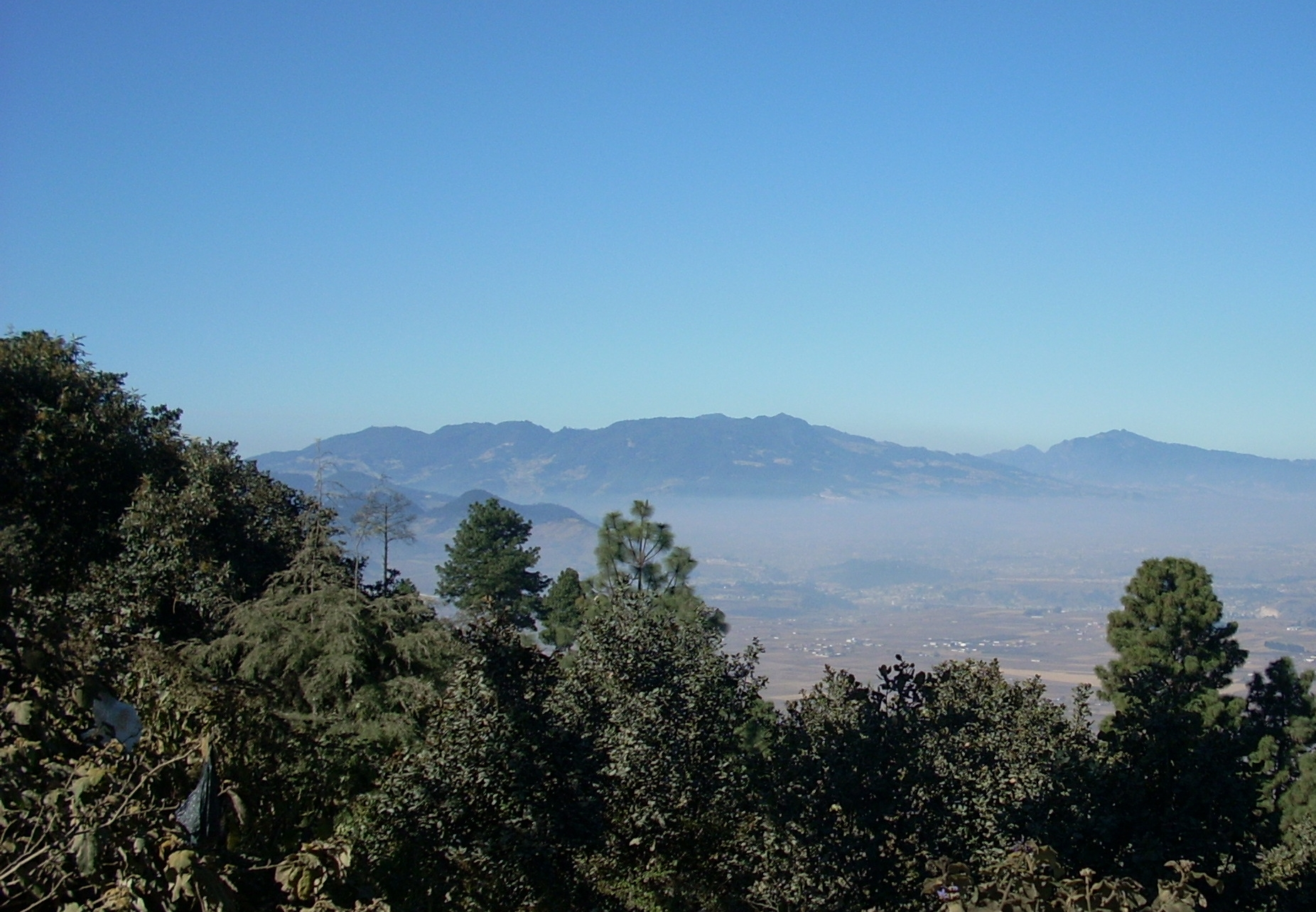
Volcán Siete Orejas as seen from the NE.

Animated 3D view of the Siete Orejas and Santa María volcanoes (click to see animation).

== See also ==
- List of volcanoes in Guatemala
