= Almolonga, Quetzaltenango =

Guatemalan town and municipality in Quetzaltenango

Almolonga
- Municipality and town
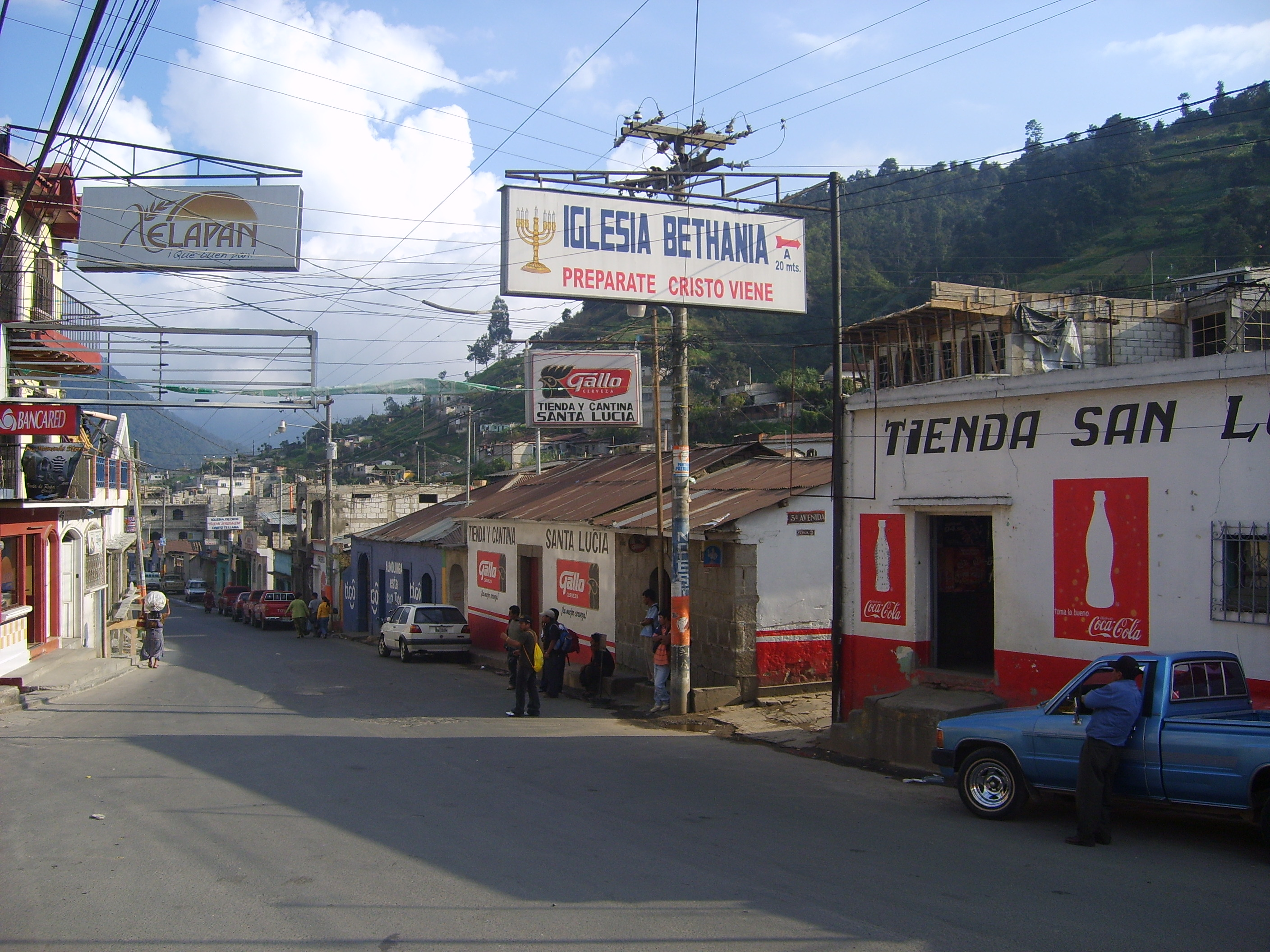

- Location in Guatemala
- Coordinates: 14°48′44″N 91°29′40″W
- Country: Guatemala
- Admin. division: Quetzaltenango
- Foundation: before 1524

Government
  - Alcalde: Catarino Eligio Cacatzun Machic

Area
  - Total: 11.9 km^{2} (4.6 sq mi)
- Elevation: 2,251 m (7,385 ft)

Population (2018 census)
  - Total: 15,724
  - Density: 1,320/km^{2} (3,420/sq mi)
- Climate: Cwb

Almolonga is a town, with a population of 17,613 (2023 census), and a municipality in the Quetzaltenango Department of Guatemala, located on the road between Ciudad de Quetzaltenango (Quetzaltenango City) and Zunil. Its population is primarily indigenous, speaking the K'iche' (Quiché) language

The town is known as the "Vegetable Basket of the Americas" (La Hortaliza de las Américas) due to the intense cultivation of vegetables in its vicinity.

Agroecologically, the valley's intensive vegetable production is sustained by fertile volcanic alluvial soils and natural geothermal spring irrigation, allowing continuous multi-cropping cycles of cold-climate crops for regional Central American markets.

Tourist attractions include the nearby thermal baths and Paradise Valley.

== Religion ==
An Evangelical church formed in Almolonga in the 1970s (as of 2016 about 25 Evangelical congregations existed in the town) that gave the population of the town valuable infrastructure that allow the town to harvest crops more successfully. There is still some argument as to what percentage of the town follows Evangelicalism, even though the town is often cited as a place of revival.
