= San Carlos Sija =

- Municipality and town
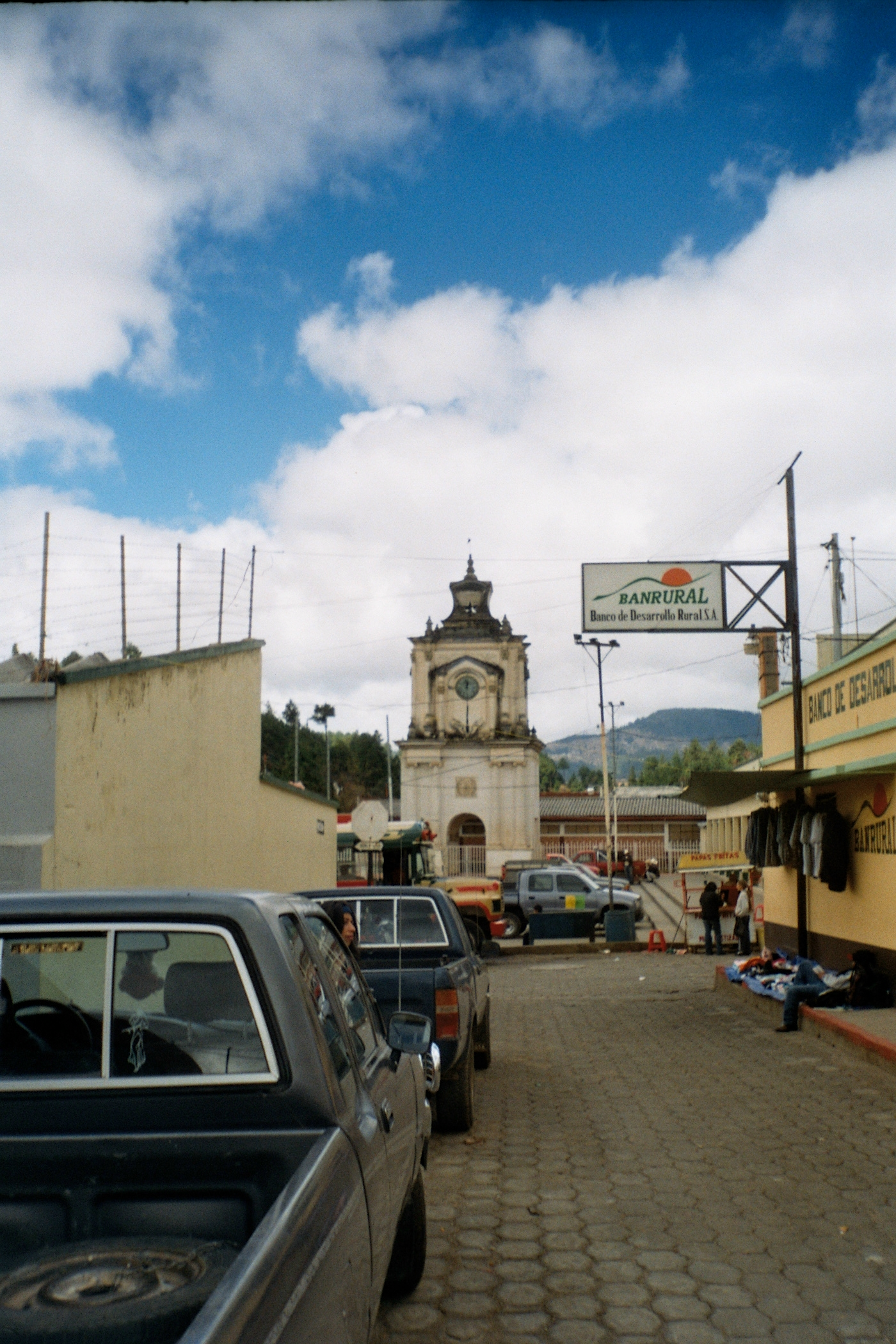

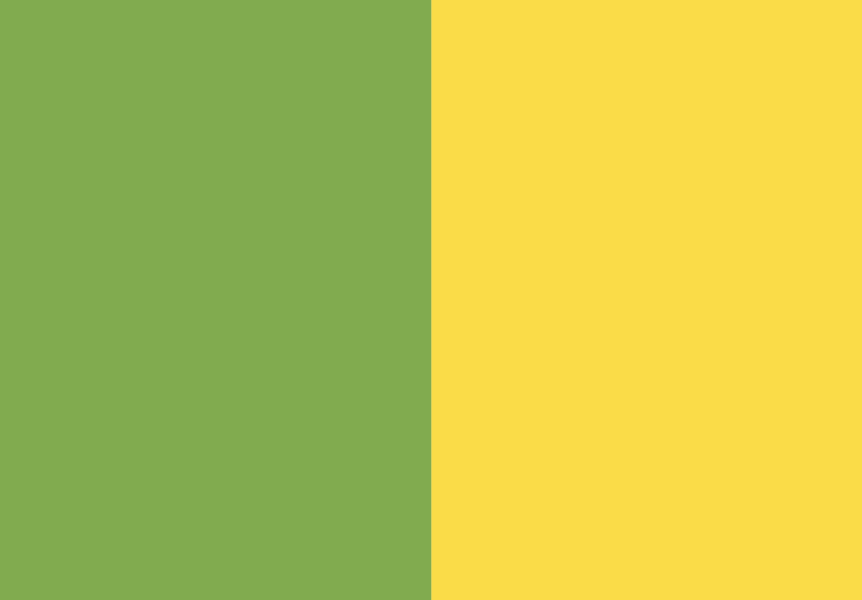
- Flag

- Location within Guatemala
- Coordinates: 14°59′N 91°33′W
- Country: Guatemala
- Department: Quetzaltenango
- Established: 1525

Government
  - Type: Democratic
  - Mayor: Leonides Calderon

Area
  - Total: 62 sq mi (160 km^{2})
- Elevation: 9,000 ft (2,700 m)

Population (2010)
  - Total: 31,000
  - Density: 500/sq mi (193/km^{2})
- Time zone: UTC+6 (Central Time)
- Area code: 502
- Climate: Cwb

San Carlos Sija is a municipality in Quetzaltenango department of Guatemala.
