= Quetzaltenango Department =

Department of Guatemala

Quetzaltenango Department Departmento de Quetzaltenango
- Department
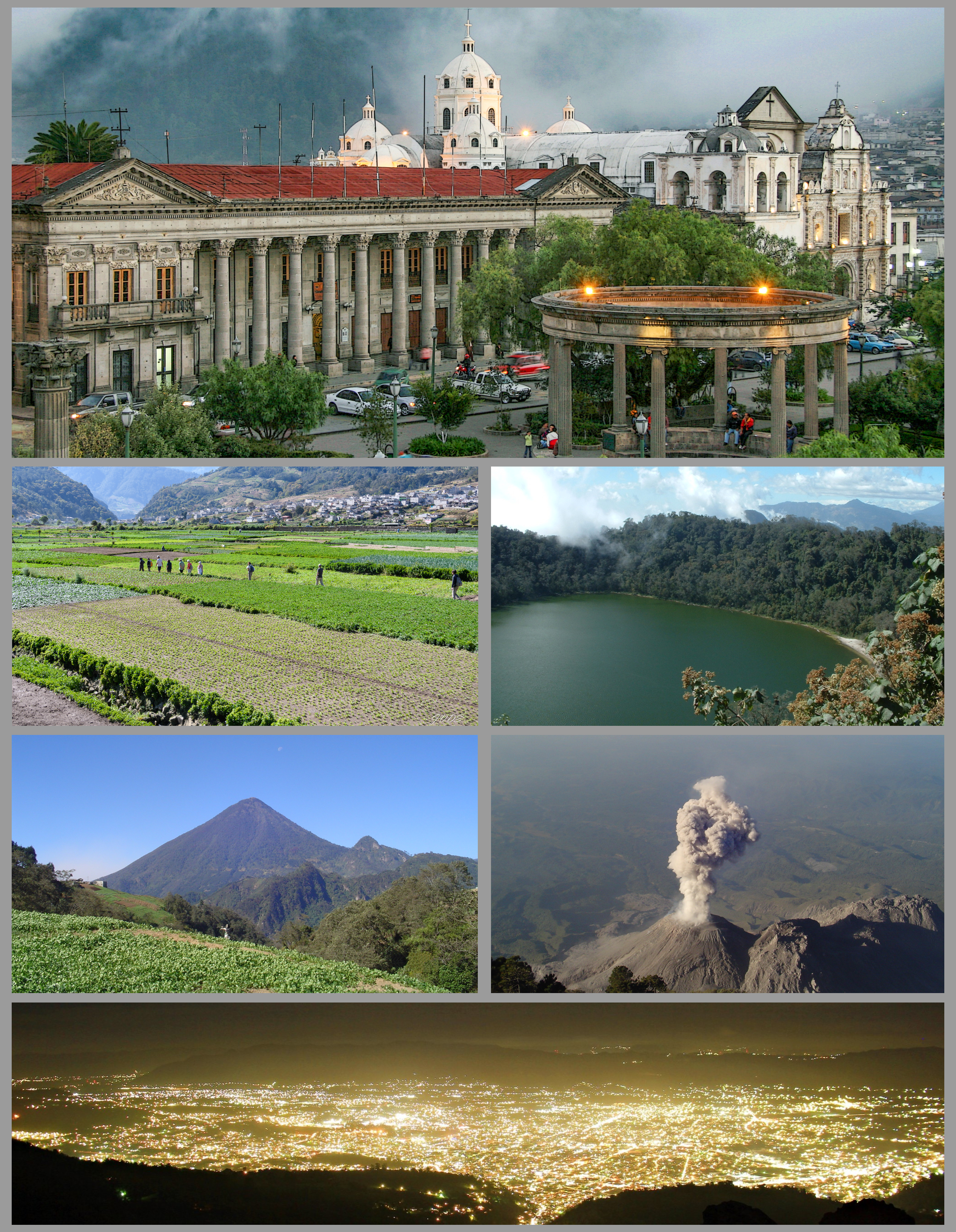
- Counterclockwise from top: Quetzaltenango Central Park, Fertile valley of Almolonga, Chicabal Lagoon, Santa Maria Volcano, Santiaguito Volcano & Quetzaltenango at night.

- Flag Coat of arms

- Quetzaltenango
- Coordinates: 14°50′45″N 91°31′08″W
- Country: Guatemala
- Capital: Quetzaltenango (Xelajú)
- Municipalities: 24

Government
  - Type: Departmental
  - Governor: Dora Otilia Alcahé López

Area
  - Department: 1,951 km^{2} (753 sq mi)
- Elevation: 2,333 m (7,654 ft)

Population (2018)
  - Department: 799,101
  - Density: 409.6/km^{2} (1,061/sq mi)
  - Urban: 491,834
  - Ethnicities: Kʼicheʼ Mam Ladino
  - Religions: Roman Catholicism Evangelicalism Maya
- Time zone: UTC-6
- ISO 3166 code: GT-QZ

Quetzaltenango is a department in the western highlands of Guatemala. The capital is the city of Quetzaltenango, the second largest city in Guatemala. The department is divided up into 24 municipalities. The inhabitants include Spanish-speaking Ladinos and the Kʼicheʼ and Mam Maya groups, both with their own Maya language. The department consists of mountainous terrain, with its principal river being the Samalá River. the department is seismically active, suffering from both earthquakes and volcanic activity.

Prior to the Spanish conquest the territory included in the modern department formed a part of the Kʼicheʼ Kingdom of Qʼumarkaj. The kingdom was defeated by the Spanish under Pedro de Alvarado in a number of decisive battles fought near the city of Quetzaltenango, then known as Xelaju. In the 19th century the territory of the modern department was included in the short-lived Central American state of Los Altos. The department was created by decree in 1845, five years after the fledgling state was crushed by Rafael Carrera.

The department has wide variations in local climate, due largely to marked differences in altitude in different areas. The year is divided into wet and dry seasons, with the wet season lasting from July to September and the dry season running from December to February. The wide climatic variation in the department allows for the production of a variety of agricultural products, including temperate fruits, vegetables and cereals in the highlands, as well as coffee on the lower slopes.

Quetzaltenango department has produced a number of high-profile Guatemalans, including several presidents as well as a number of musicians.

== Name ==
The department takes its name from the city of Quetzaltenango, which serves as the departmental capital. Although the original Kʼicheʼ inhabitants knew the city by the name Xelaju, the Nahuatl-speaking allies of the Spanish Conquistadors named it Quetzaltenango in their own language, meaning "land of the quetzal birds".

== History ==
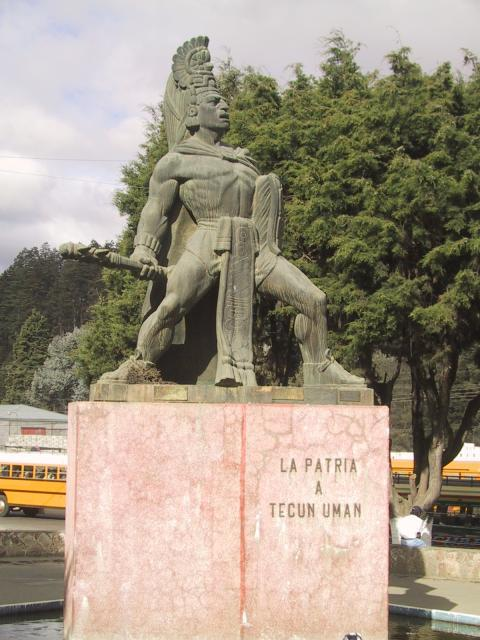
Statue of Tecun Uman in Quetzaltenango city

=== Early history ===
The territory that came to be included within the modern department of Quetzaltenango was the scene of several decisive battles in February 1524 between Spanish conquistador Pedro de Alvarado and the Kʼicheʼ Kingdom of Qʼumarkaj. Pedro de Alvarado had initially advanced with his army along the Pacific coast without opposition until they reached the Samalá River; this region formed a part of the Kʼicheʼ kingdom. Alvarado then turned to head upriver into the Sierra Madre mountains towards the Kʼicheʼ heartlands, crossing the pass into the fertile valley of Quetzaltenango. On 12 February 1524 Alvarado's Mexican allies were ambushed in the pass and driven back by the Kʼicheʼ warriors but the Spanish cavalry charge that followed was a shock for the Kʼicheʼ who had never seen horses before. The cavalry scattered the Kʼicheʼ and the army crossed to the city of Xelaju, modern Quetzaltenango, to find it deserted by its inhabitants. Although the common view is that the Kʼicheʼ prince Tecun Uman died in the later battle near Olintepeque, the Spanish accounts are clear that at least one and possibly two of the lords of Qʼumarkaj died in the fierce battles upon the initial approach to Quetzaltenango. The death of Tecun Uman is said to have taken place in the battle of El Pinar, and local tradition has his death taking place upon the Llanos de Urbina (Plains of Urbina), upon the approach to Quetzaltenango near the modern village of Cantel. Pedro de Alvardo, in his 3rd letter to Hernán Cortés, describes the death of one of the four lords of Qʼumarkaj upon the approach to Quetzaltenango. The letter was dated 11 April 1524 and was written during his stay at Qʼumarkaj. Almost a week later, on 18 February 1524, a Kʼicheʼ army confronted the Spanish army in the Quetzaltenango valley where they were comprehensively defeated, with many Kʼicheʼ nobles among the dead. Such were the numbers of Kʼicheʼ dead that Olintepeque was given the new name Xequiquel, roughly meaning "bathed in blood". This battle exhausted the Kʼicheʼ militarily and they asked for peace and offered tribute, inviting Pedro de Alvarado into their capital Qʼumarkaj.

On 2 February 1838, Quetzaltenango joined together with Huehuetenango, El Quiché, Retalhuleu, San Marcos, Sololá, Suchitepéquez and Totonicapán to form the short-lived Central American state of Los Altos, with the city of Quetzaltenango functioning as its capital. The state was crushed in 1840 by general Rafael Carrera Turcios, at that time between periods in office as Guatemalan president.

=== Departmental history ===
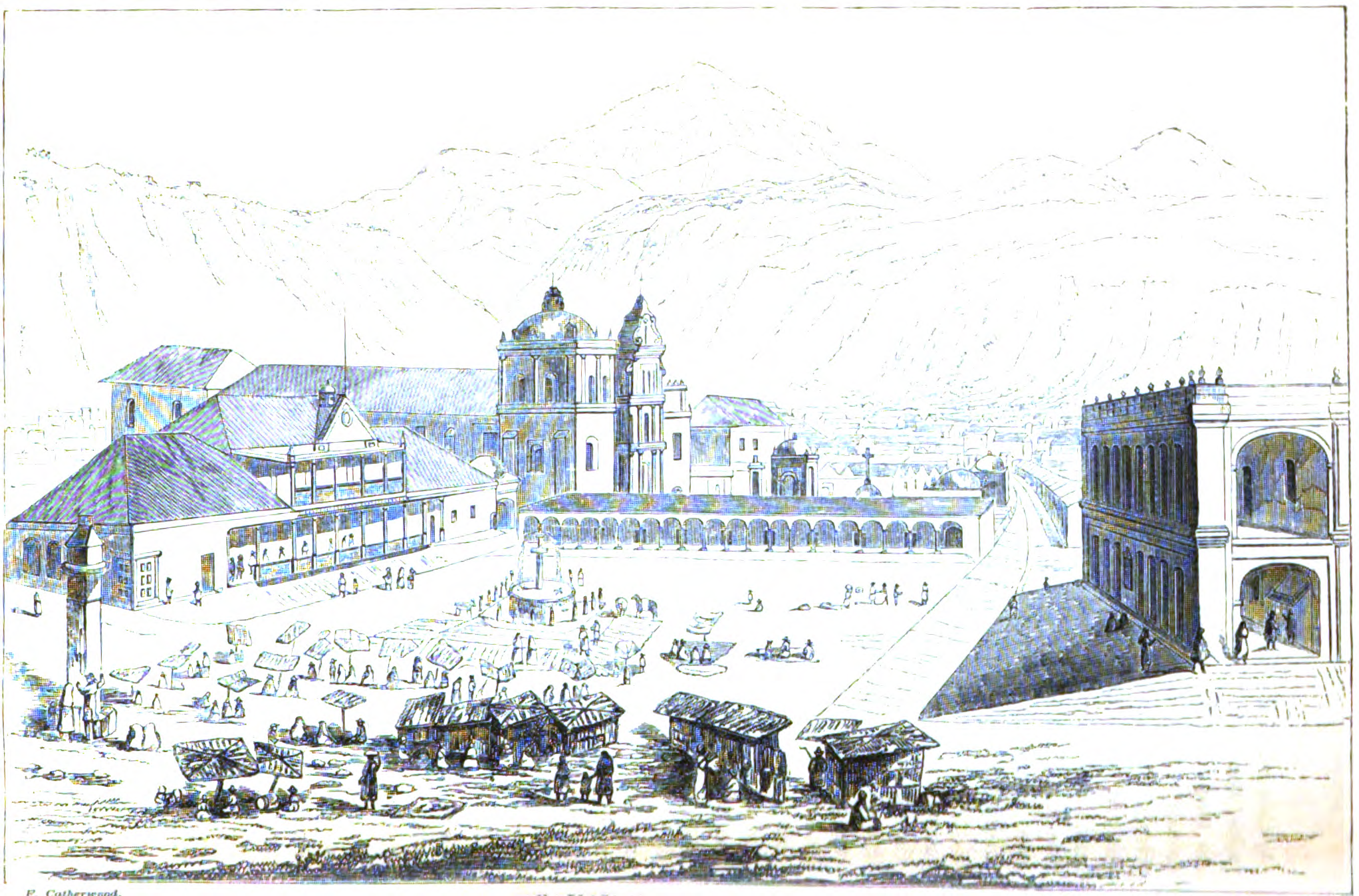
Quetzaltenango's central park and cathedral in 1840, sketched by Frederick Catherwood

Quetzaltenango was declared a department by decree of the Asamblea Nacional Constituyente on 16 September 1845.

In 1902 Quetzaltenango suffered a number of serious earthquakes. An earthquake struck on 18 April 1902, with its epicentre within the Santa María volcano. This was followed by a major eruption of the volcano from 24 to 26 October of the same year. The volcano emitted a massive column of ash, provoking a fierce lightning storm. The explosions emitted by the volcano were audible up to 160 kilometres (99 mi) away. The government of Manuel Estrada Cabrera initially denied that the eruption had taken place in Guatemala, instead claiming that it had occurred in neighbouring Mexico. Although the eruption caused great loss of life in western Guatemala, the Guatemalan government downplayed its severity.

The activity of the volcano continued until 1906, followed be a period of calm that lasted until 1922. A new series of eruptions took place from 1922 through to 1929, and formed a new side crater, the Santiaguito volcano. On the night of 11 November 1929, a lava flow descended from the volcano towards El Palmar, killing hundreds of people, setting fire to a number of mountainsides and burying coffee plantations under several metres of lava.

== Geography ==
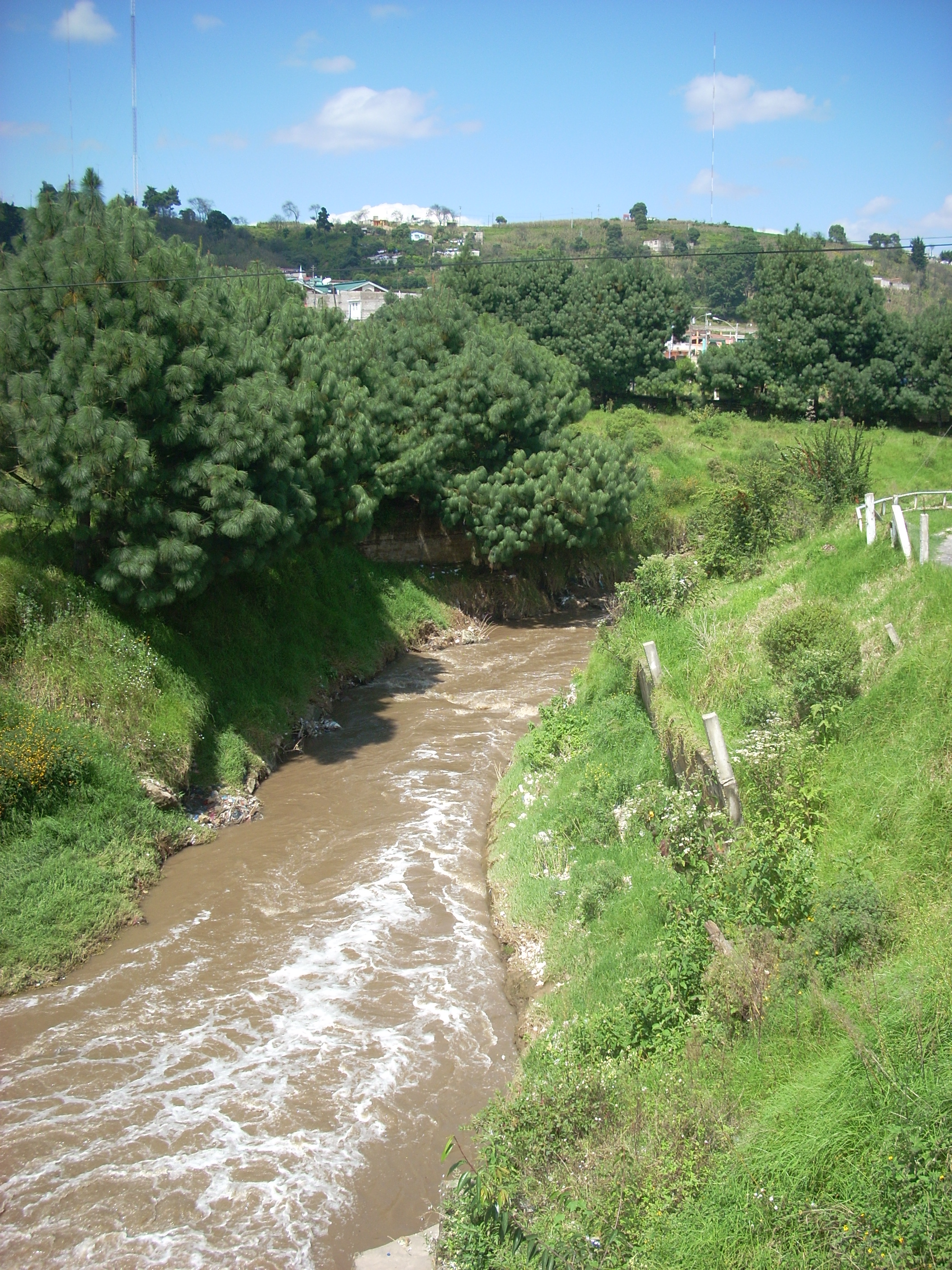
The Samalá River flowing through the outskirts of Quetzaltenango city

The department of Quetzaltenango is situated in the western highlands of Guatemala and covers an area of approximately 1,951 square kilometres (753 sq mi), approximately 1.8% of the total area of the Republic of Guatemala. The department is bordered on the west by the department of San Marcos, by the departments of Retalhuleu and Suchitepéquez to the south, by Huehuetenango Department to the north and by the departments of Totonicapán and Sololá to the east.

The department is mountainous in nature and includes a wide range of altitudes, from 350 metres (1,150 ft) in Génova to 2,800 metres (9,200 ft) in Sibilia. The average altitude is 2,333 metres (7,654 ft) above mean sea level. The principal mountains include the volcanoes Cerro Quemado, Chicabal, Lacandon, Santa María, Santiaguito, Santo Tomás (also known as Picul) and Siete Orejas, as well as Zunil peak, often erroneously referred to as a volcano. Cerro Quemado produces a number of thermal springs, several of which have been converted into baths. The area covered by the department is seismically active, with earthquakes measuring from 4.5 to 5.2 on the Richter scale.

The broken terrain of the department includes a number of wide valleys, including those occupied by the city of Quetzaltenango and the towns of San Juan Ostuncalco and Concepción Chiquirichapa. The varied terrain of the department also includes plains, canyons and high cliffs.

The most important river in the department is the Samalá River, flowing through the municipalities of Cantel, El Palmar, San Carlos Sija, Quetzaltenango, San Juan Ostuncalco and Zunil. The river flows into Quetzaltenango department from the neighbouring department of Totonicapán and flows southwards into the department of Retalhuleu.

Other notable rivers in the department include the Tumalá River in the municipality of Cajolá, the El Naranjo River in the municipality of San Carlos Sija, and the Las Palomas and Xocal Rivers in the municipality of Concepción Chiquirichapa.

=== Volcanoes ===
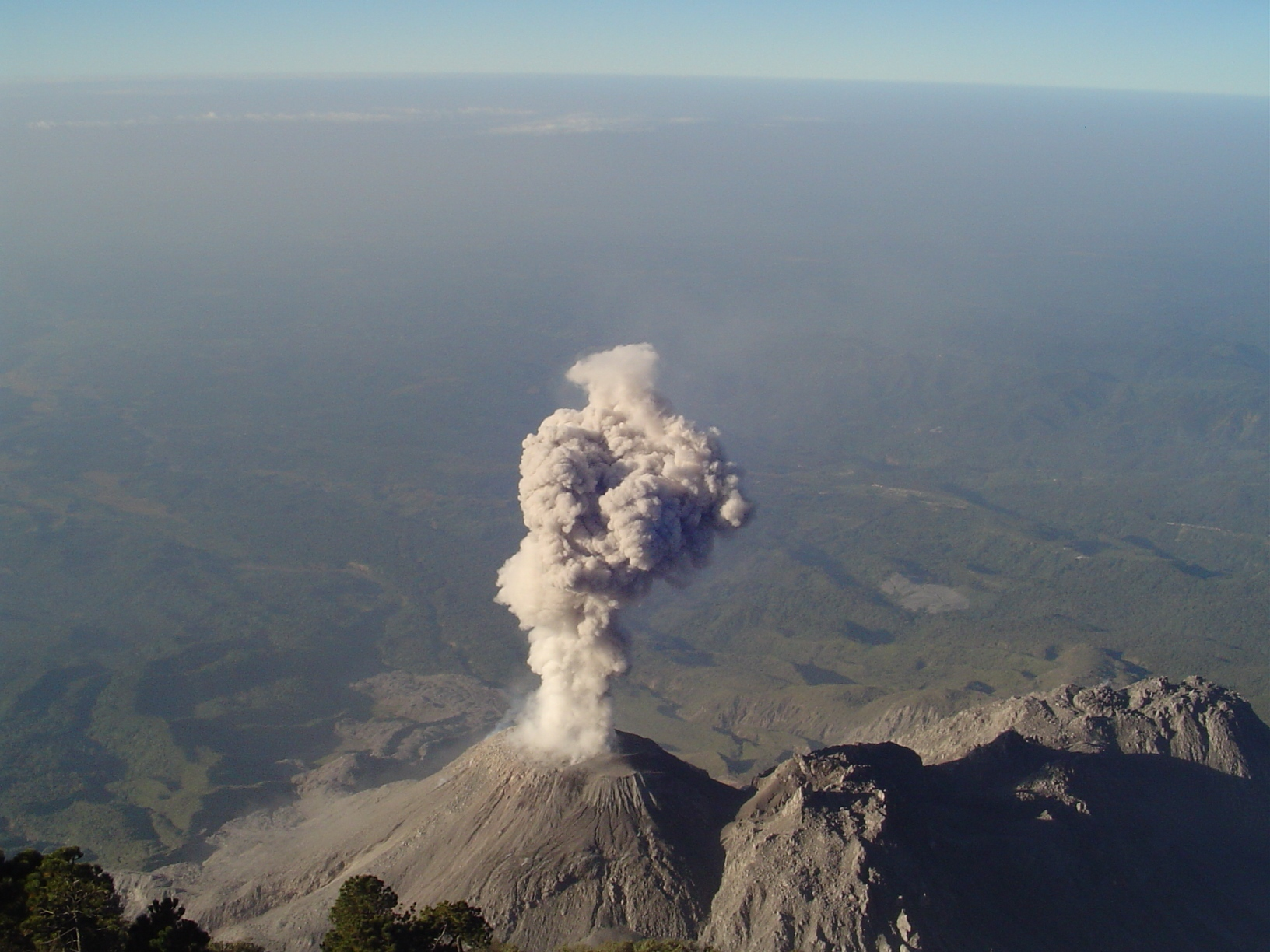
The Santiaguito volcano is in a state of constant activity

Name	Height
Cerro Quemado	3,197 metres (10,489 ft)
Chicabal	
Lacandon	
Santa María	3,772 metres (12,375 ft)
Santiaguito	2,500 metres (8,200 ft)
Santo Tomás (Picul)	3,505 metres (11,499 ft)
Siete Orejas	3,370 metres (11,060 ft)

=== Other notable peaks ===
Name	Height
Zunil	3,542 metres (11,621 ft)

== Climate ==
The average temperature in the department of Quetzaltenango varies between 15 and 24 °C (59 and 75 °F), however there is wide variation due to the great difference in altitude in various parts of the department. On the lower Pacific slopes the temperature can reach as high as 35 °C (95 °F), while temperatures as low as −7 °C (19 °F) have been recorded at higher altitudes.

Average annual rainfall is 2,000 millimetres (79 in) in the municipality of Almolonga, and parts of the department at higher altitudes experience frost in the months from November through to March. The municipality of Cantel receives an average annual rainfall that varies between 2,000 and 4,000 millimetres (79 and 157 in); in Huitán it varies between 1,800 and 3,500 millimetres (71 and 138 in).

The year is divided into wet and dry seasons, with most rain falling in July and September. The driest months of the year are December through to February. The department falls within two principal biomes, classified as subtropical moist forest and tropical and subtropical coniferous forest. The former is a lower altitude zone characterised by corozo palms and conacaste (Enterolobium cyclocarpum). The latter is higher altitude featuring pine, cypress and sycamore.

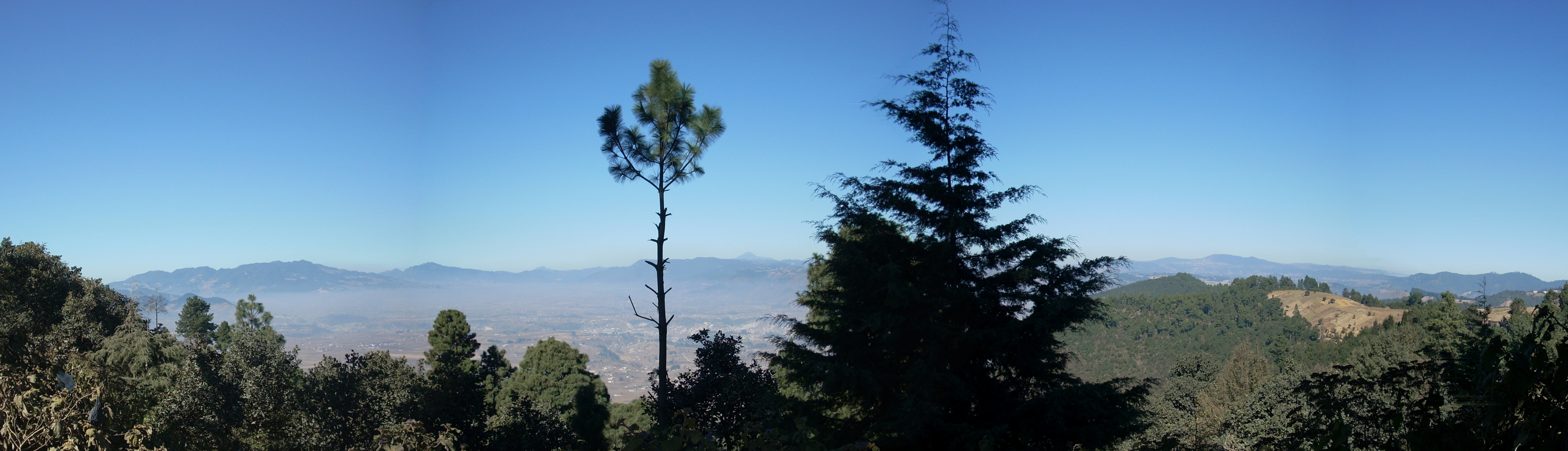
Subtropical coniferous forest in the department of Quetzaltenango. The mountain at left is the Siete Orejas volcano.

== Population ==
The 2018 census recorded the department's population at 799,101 inhabitants. The inhabitants are divided between three principal ethnicities; Ladino, Kʼicheʼ Maya and Mam Maya. Three languages are spoken in the department, broadly corresponding to the ethnic groups; Spanish, Kʼicheʼ and Mam. In 2004, 40.4% of the population was listed as non-indigenous (i.e. Ladino) and 59.6% as indigenous (mainly Kʼicheʼ and Mam). In 1999, average life expectancy was calculated as 63.7 years. In the same year, 63.7% of dwellings had electricity, 70.1% had drinking water and 92.5% had sanitation.

Each municipality is known for its different traditional indigenous dress, with the exceptions of Coatepeque, Colomba, Flores Costa Cuca and San Carlos Sija, where traditional clothing is not worn by the indigenous inhabitants. These trajes are manufactured by the local inhabitants themselves.

== Economy and agriculture ==
The wide climatic variation within the department resulting from differences in altitude gives rise to a diverse range of agricultural products. These include apples, beetroot, cabbages, carrots, high quality coffee, common beans, maize, onions, peaches, plums, potatoes, radishes, turnips and wheat. Almolonga is the main producer of vegetables, both for the national market and for export, principally to Mexico and countries in Central America. Salcajá is known for its production of a fruit liquor called caldo de frutas ("fruit wine"). Other products of the department include woolen textiles, cotton, silk, ceramics, alcoholic beverages and flour.

Poorer high altitude areas of the department experience seasonal migration of workers to the Pacific lowlands in order to work on coffee, sugarcane and cotton plantations.

Municipality	Principal agricultural products	Non-agricultural products
Almolonga	Vegetables, maize, common bean, pigs, sheep, cattle	Textiles
Cabricán	Vegetables, maize, common bean, broad bean, apples, wheat	Limestone
Cajolá	Maize, common bean, broad bean, wheat, pigs	Textiles, bricks, pipes, pots, basins, shoes, ironwork, carpentry.
Cantel	Maize, cabbage, onions, vegetables	Textiles
Coatepeque	Horses, cattle, coffee, maize, rice, sugarcane, cotton	Minimal non-agricultural production
Colomba	Coffee, cardamom, macadamia nuts, bananas, cattle	Sandals
Concepción Chiquirichapa		
El Palmar		
Flores Costa Cuca		
Génova		
Huitán		
La Esperanza		
Olintepeque		
Palestina de Los Altos		
Quetzaltenango		
Salcajá		
San Carlos Sija		
San Francisco La Unión		
San Juan Ostuncalco		
San Martín Sacatepéquez	Maize, potatoes, vegetables	Textiles, bricks, bread
San Mateo	Potatoes, cauliflower, cabbage, carrots, cattle	Bricks, textiles, kitchen griddles
San Miguel Sigüilá	Maize, oats, wheat, potatoes, broad beans, peaches	Textiles, bricks, tiles
Sibilia	Maize, potatoes, wheat, oats, barley, pigs	Bricks, carpentry, metalwork, bread
Zunil	Vegetables, poultry, cattle, pigs	Textiles, bread, metalwork

== Tourism ==
Quetzaltenango city is the main tourist hub for the department and is a centre for cultural tourism. Most hotels are located in Quetzaltenango city and Coatepeque, with 495 registered hotels in 2006. Quetzaltenango city is also a centre for tourists studying Spanish as a second language, with 35 Spanish schools in 2006. Tourist attractions outside Quetzaltenango city include the thermal baths located around the Cerro Quemado volcano, including the thermal baths of Almolonga, Aguas Amargas ("Bitter Waters") and Fuentes Georginas, which has become a tourist attraction of some importance.

== Archaeological sites ==
In 2010, seasonal rains uncovered the small Kʼicheʼ archaeological site of Chojolom in the municipality of Cantel. It has been tentatively dated to the Postclassic Period (c. 950-1521 AD). Cerro Quiac is another small site on a hilltop in Cantel municipality, dated to the Early Postclassic period (c. 950-1200 AD).

== Political structure ==
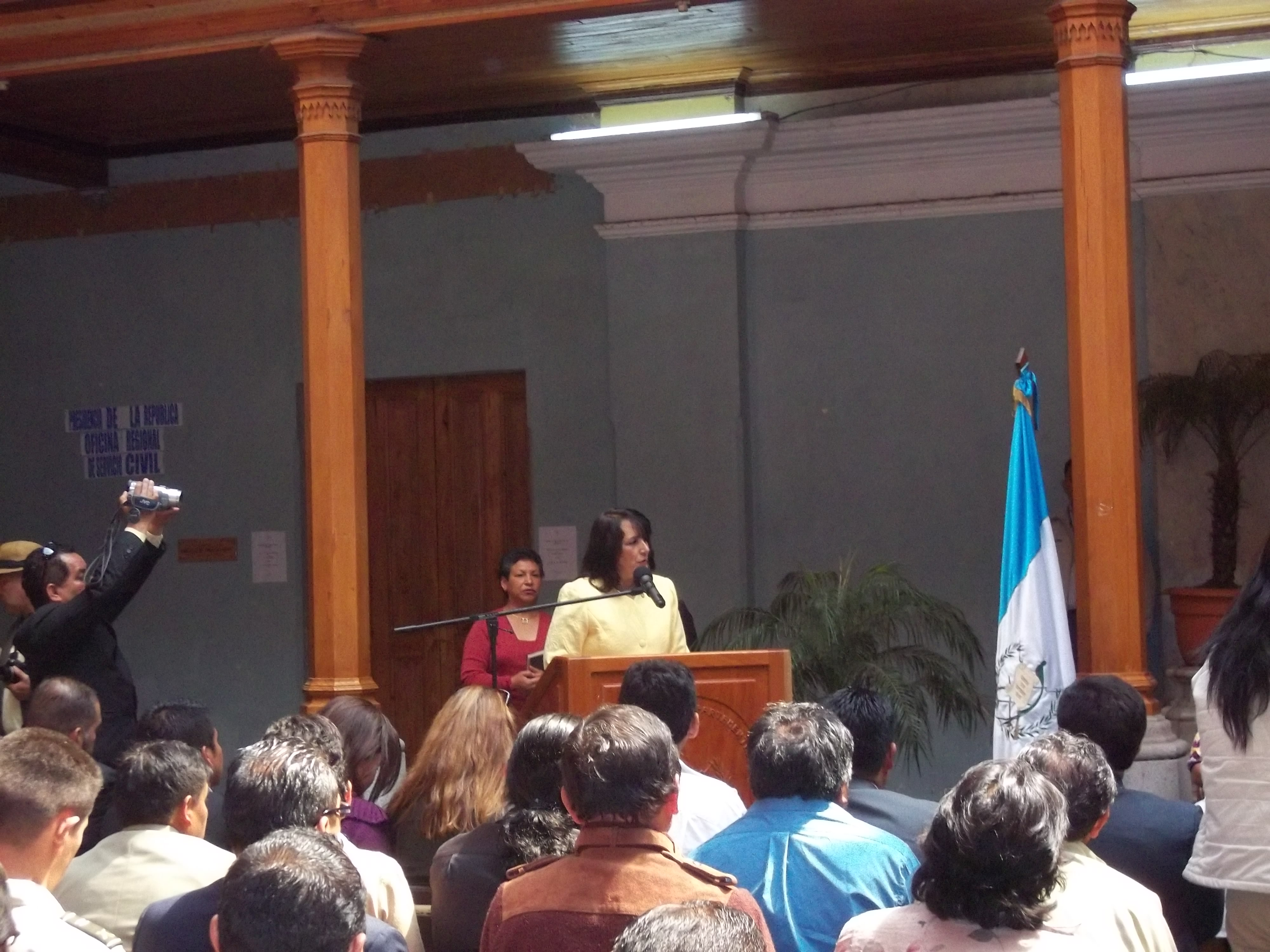
Governor Dora Otilia Alcahé López giving her inauguration speech in Quetzaltenango in February 2012

The departmental government is headed by the Governor of Quetzaltenango, who is appointed directly by the president of Guatemala. Aldo Herrera Scheel was appointed as departmental governor in 2024 by president Bernardo Arévalo.

== Municipalities ==
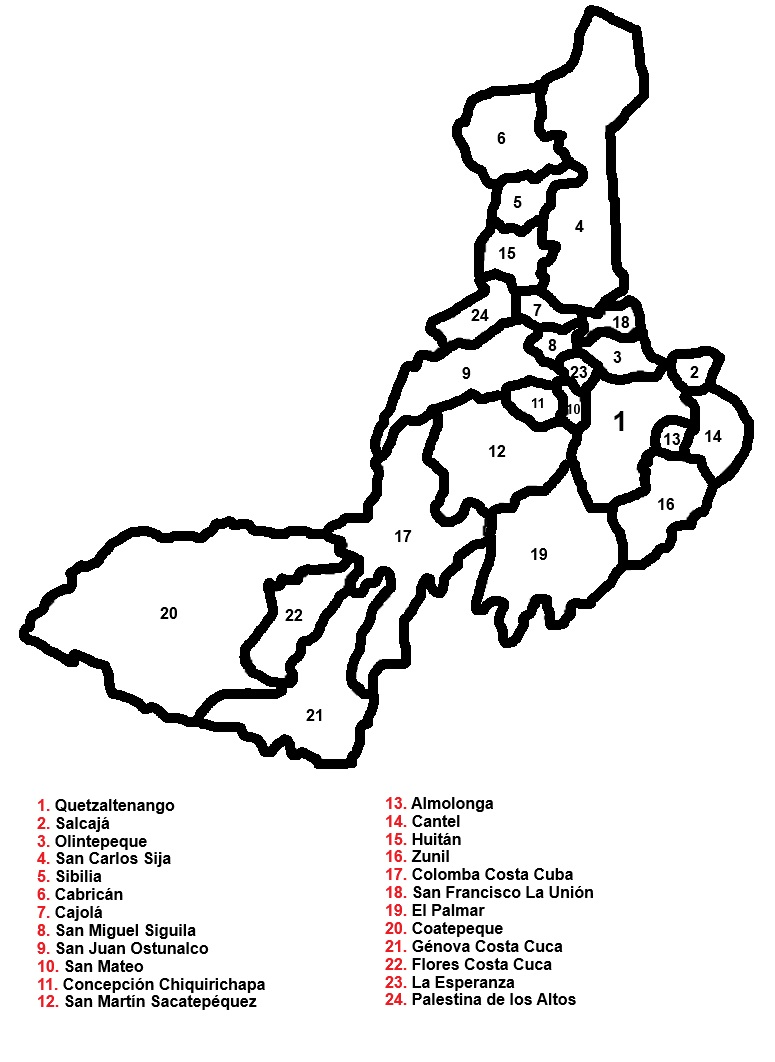
Municipalities of Quetzaltenango

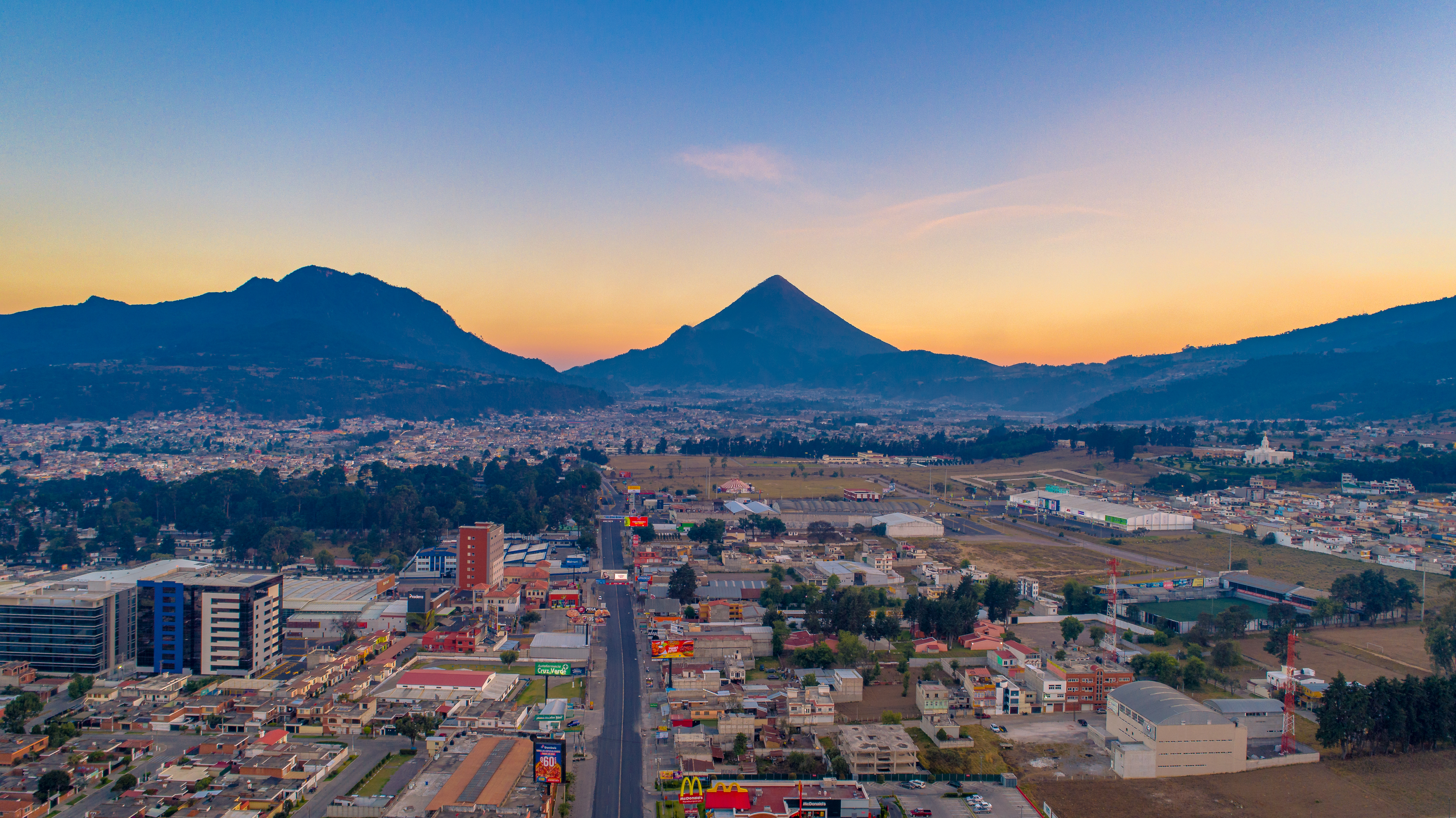
Panoramic view of the City of Quetzaltenango

Municipality	Ethnicity	Population (Note: 2002 census.)	Festival	Altitude	Extent
Almolonga	Kʼicheʼ	13,880	29 June	2,251 metres (7,385 ft)	20 square kilometres (7.7 sq mi)
Cabricán	Mam	19,281	4th Friday of Lent	2,625 metres (8,612 ft)	60 square kilometres (23 sq mi)
Cajolá	Mam	9,868	3 May	2,510 metres (8,230 ft)	36 square kilometres (14 sq mi)
Cantel	Kʼicheʼ	30,888	12–17 August	2,370 metres (7,780 ft)	22 square kilometres (8.5 sq mi)
Coatepeque	Mam	94,186	12–18 March	497 metres (1,631 ft)	372 square kilometres (144 sq mi)
Colomba	Mam	38,746	14–16 January, 26 August	1,011 metres (3,317 ft)	212 square kilometres (82 sq mi)
Concepción Chiquirichapa	Mam	15,912	6–9 December	2,505 metres (8,219 ft)	48 square kilometres (19 sq mi)
El Palmar	Kʼicheʼ	22,917	23–25 July	850 metres (2,790 ft)	327 square kilometres (126 sq mi) (Note: Although administered by the Department of Quetzaltenango, some of the municipality lies geographically within the department of Retalhuleu after the relocation of the village following a series of natural disasters provoked by the Santiaguito volcano.)
Flores Costa Cuca	Mam	19,405	1st week of February	540 metres (1,770 ft)	63 square kilometres (24 sq mi)
Génova	Mam	30,531	8 December	375 metres (1,230 ft)	372 square kilometres (144 sq mi)
Huitán	Mam	9,769	25 December	2,438 metres (7,999 ft)	16 square kilometres (6.2 sq mi)
La Esperanza	Mam	14,497	28 April–5 May	2,465 metres (8,087 ft)	32 square kilometres (12 sq mi)
Olintepeque	Kʼicheʼ	22,544	24 June	2,438 metres (7,999 ft)	32 square kilometres (12 sq mi)
Palestina de Los Altos	Mam	11,682	1st Friday of Lent	2,620 metres (8,600 ft)	48 square kilometres (19 sq mi)
Quetzaltenango	Ladino/Kʼicheʼ	127,569	15 September	2,333 metres (7,654 ft)	120 square kilometres (46 sq mi)
Salcajá	Ladino/Kʼicheʼ	14,829	25 August	2,321 metres (7,615 ft)	12 square kilometres (4.6 sq mi)
San Carlos Sija	Kʼicheʼ	28,389	7–15 December	2,652 metres (8,701 ft)	148 square kilometres (57 sq mi)
San Francisco La Unión	Kʼicheʼ	7,403	12–18 January	2,770 metres (9,090 ft)	14 square kilometres (5.4 sq mi)
San Juan Ostuncalco	Mam	41,150	2 February	2,501 metres (8,205 ft)	109 square kilometres (42 sq mi)
San Martín Sacatepéquez	Mam	20,712	8–11 November	2,490 metres (8,170 ft)	100 square kilometres (39 sq mi)
San Mateo	Kʼicheʼ	4,982	10–22 September	2,497 metres (8,192 ft)	20 square kilometres (7.7 sq mi)
San Miguel Sigüilá	Mam	6,506	29 September	2,450 metres (8,040 ft)	28 square kilometres (11 sq mi)
Sibilia	Kʼicheʼ	7,796	15 January	2,800 metres (9,200 ft)	28 square kilometres (11 sq mi)
Zunil	Kʼicheʼ	11,274	25 November	2,076 metres (6,811 ft)	92 square kilometres (36 sq mi)

== Notable people ==
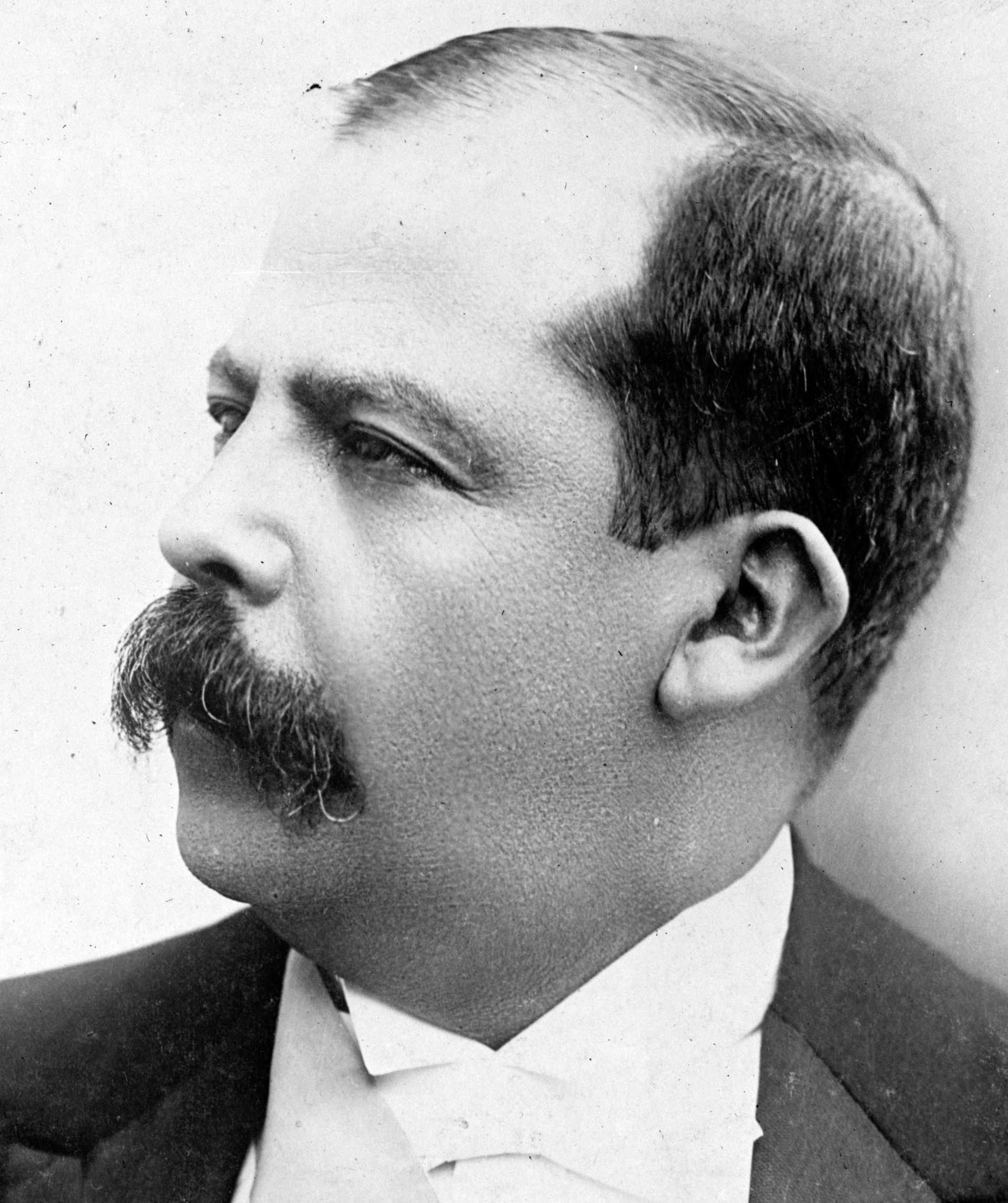
Former president Manuel Estrada Cabrera, a native of Quetzaltenango

Former presidents of Guatemala Manuel Estrada Cabrera and Jacobo Árbenz Guzmán were from the department of Quetzaltenango. Manuel Estrada was born in the city of Quetzaltenango on 21 November 1857, Jacobo Árbenz was born in the same city on 14 September 1913. Quetzaltenango Department also produced the musicians Jesús Castillo, writer of the Quiché Winak opera, and his brother Ricardo Castillo, as well as the classical musician Mariano Valverde. Another notable musician was Francisco "Paco" Pérez, who wrote the Luna de Xelajú waltz. Guatemalan historian Adrián Inés Chávez, who produced a Spanish translation of the Popul Vuh, was also from the department.
