= Sibilia, Quetzaltenango =

Sibilia Sibilia
- Location in Guatemala
- Coordinates: 15°0′0″N 91°37′0″W
- Country: Guatemala
- Department: Quetzaltenango

Government
  - Type: Mayor-Council Government

Area
  - Total: 11 sq mi (28 km^{2})

Population
  - Total: 9,220
- Postal code: 09005
- Climate: Cwb

Sibilia is a municipality in the Quetzaltenango Department of Guatemala. It covers an area of 28 km² and sits at an elevation of 2800 metres above sea level. The town is roughly located 19km northwest of the department capital, Quetzaltenango, and 126km east from the country's capital, Guatemala City. As of 2023, it has a population of 9,220. The region is known for strong Mestizo migration to areas of the U.S. like Los Angeles, Oklahoma City, and the South Florida cities of West Palm Beach and Fort Lauderdale, where they maintain big communities of Sibilia growing.
