= San Martín Sacatepéquez =

Coordinates: 14.824621°N 91.642499°W

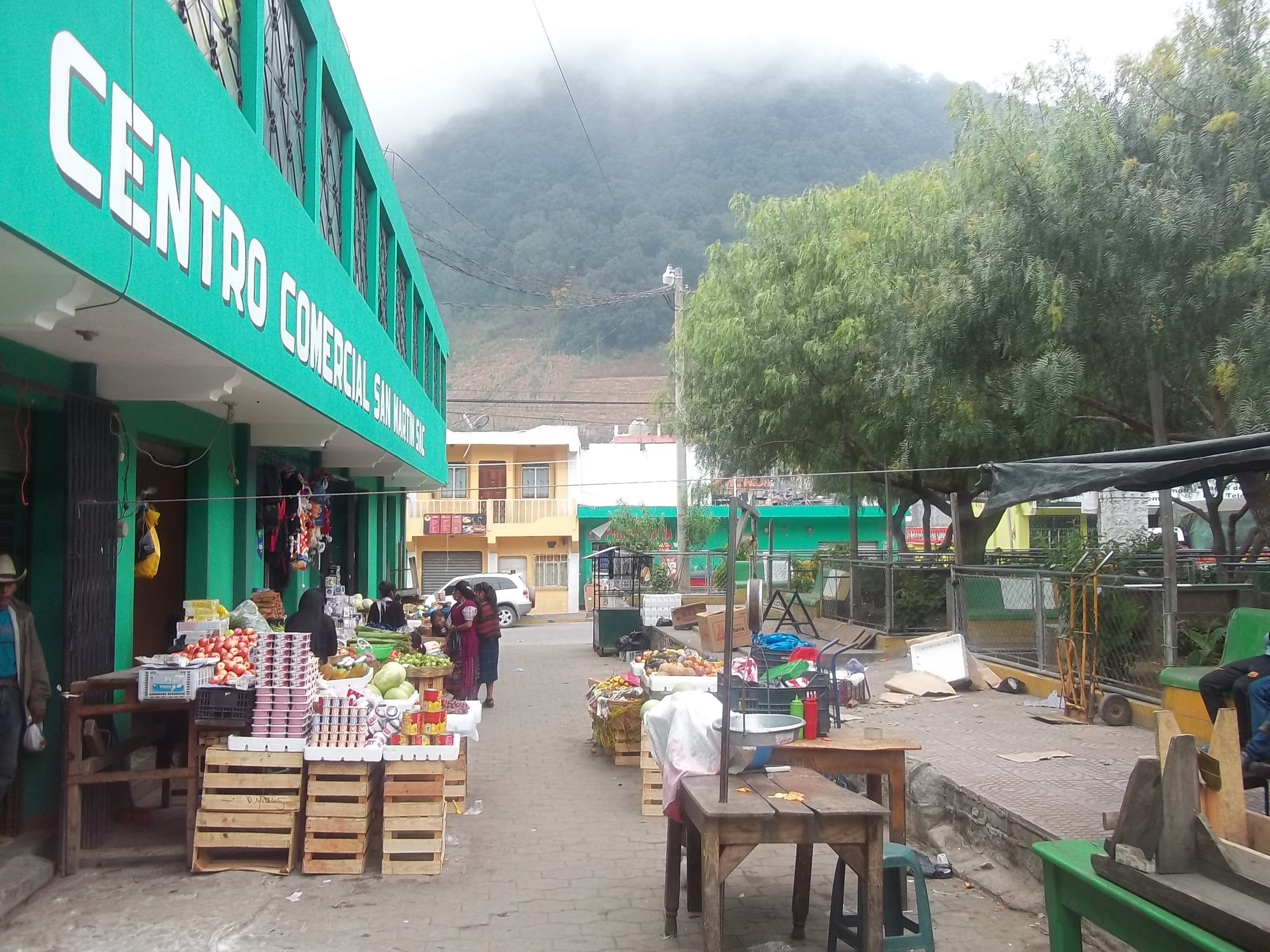
Central San Martín Sacatepéquez

San Martín Sacatepéquez (Spanish pronunciation: [sam maɾˈtin sakateˈpekes]) is one of 24 municipalities in the department of Quetzaltenango, Guatemala. San Martín Sacatepéquez has a surface area of 100 square kilometres (39 sq mi). The center of the town is situated at 2,450 metres (8,040 ft) above mean sea level. According to the 2000 government survey, it had 28,926 inhabitants.

== Geography ==
San Martín Sacatepéquez is located on the edge of the volcanic chain that divides the Western Highlands of Guatemala from the coastal plain. Just below the volcanic chain, to the southwest, the rich Boca Costa (piedmont) soils extend toward the Pacific Ocean. The Boca Costa occupies the warmer more tropical lands from 300 to 1,800 metres (980 to 5,910 ft) above sea level. To the northeast lies the altiplano, the elevated pumice-laden volcanic highlands. The altiplano encompasses the colder territory found at higher elevations, ranging from 1,800 metres (5,900 ft) above sea level to the peak of the Siete Orejas Volcano, San Martín's highest point at 3,370 metres (11,060 ft) above sea level. The town is also known as San Martín Chile Verde, due to the large quantity of green chili peppers its farmers historically grew and brought to Quetzaltenango to sell. As is true throughout much of the highlands of Guatemala, in San Martín weather is divided into two seasons: the rainy season—which lasts from early May to early November—and the dry season—which lasts from early November to early May.

== Culture ==
San Martín Sacatepéquez is predominantly inhabited by Indigenous peoples of Maya, Mam descent. Linguistically, San Martín is part of the Southern Mam speaking region of Guatemala. The Laguna Chicabal, a crater lake and holy site for the Mam, is located within the municipal boundary of San Martín. San Martín is also notable due to the colorful traditional garb (known in Guatemala as traje) still worn by the residents. Although most Maya men throughout Guatemala have adopted Western clothing, a large population of men in San Martín still wear traje.
