= La Esperanza, Quetzaltenango =

La Esperanza
- Municipality
- Location within Guatemala
- Coordinates: 14°52′N 91°34′W
- Country: Guatemala
- Department: Quetzaltenango

Area
  - Municipality: 6.1 sq mi (15.9 km^{2})

Population (2018 census)
  - Municipality: 22,166
  - Density: 3,610/sq mi (1,390/km^{2})
  - Urban: 19,724
- Time zone: UTC+6 (Central Time)
- Climate: Cwb

La Esperanza is a municipality in the Quetzaltenango department of Guatemala. It covers an area of 15.9 km^{2} at an altitude of 2465 metres. This municipality was founded on April 7, 1910.
