= Zunil =

- Municipality
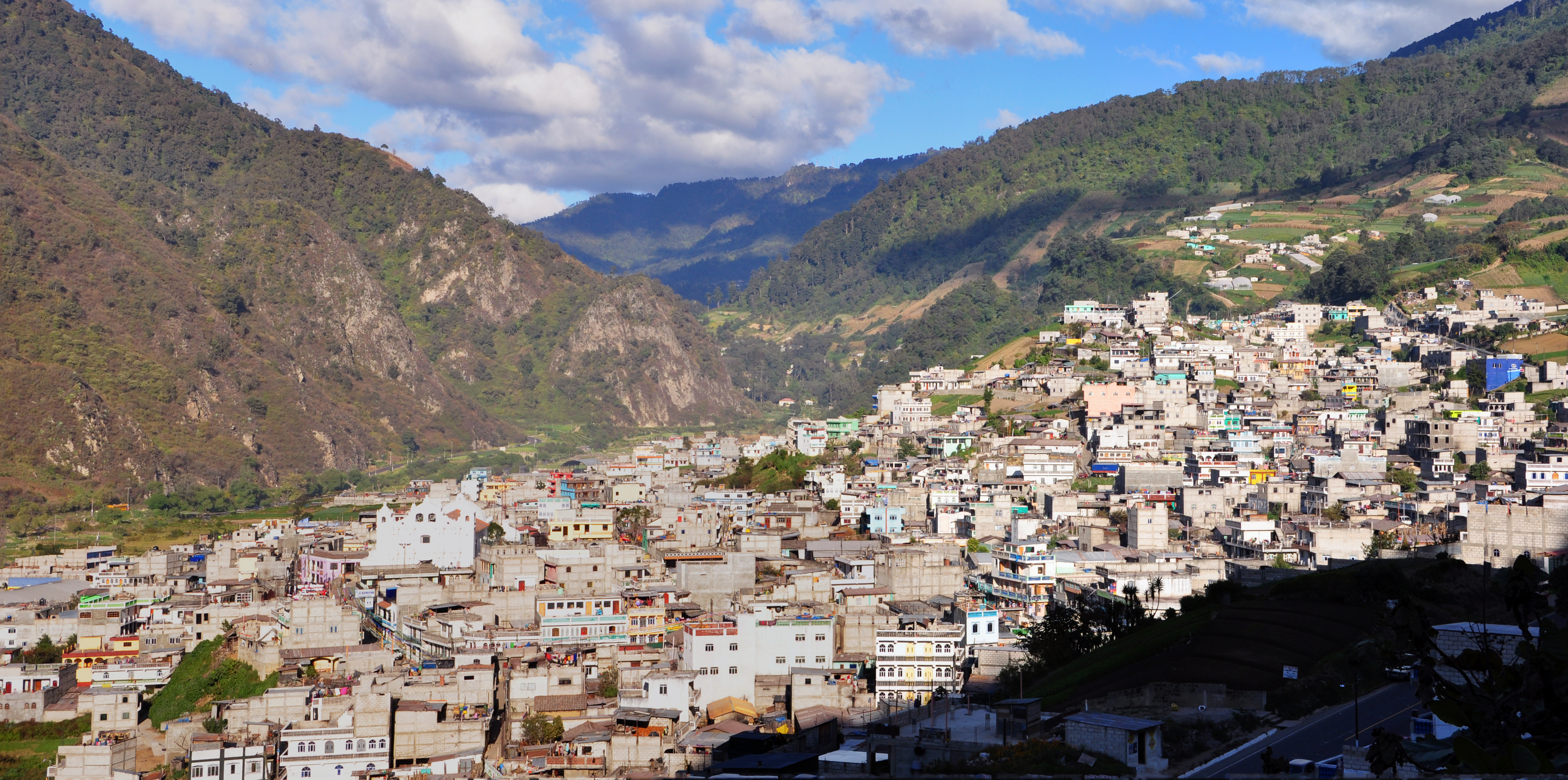
- Panorama, 2009

- Location in Guatemala
- Coordinates: 14°47′N 91°29′W
- Country: Guatemala
- Department: Quetzaltenango

Government
  - Mayor: Jose Maria Chaj (2012-2016)

Area
  - Municipality: 80 km^{2} (31 sq mi)
- Elevation: 2,076 m (6,811 ft)

Population (2018 census)
  - Municipality: 14,118
  - Density: 180/km^{2} (460/sq mi)
  - Urban: 10,792
- Climate: Cwb

Zunil (Spanish pronunciation: [suˈnil]) is a town and municipality in the Quetzaltenango department of Guatemala with a surface area of 80 square kilometres (31 sq mi). The town of Zunil is located 9 kilometres (5.6 mi) from the city of Quetzaltenango, on the bank of the Salamá River. Zunil has an altitude of approximately 2,075 metres (6,808 ft) above mean sea level. The population of the municipality, which is 100% indigenous, was 14,118 at the 2018 census. The inhabitants speak Kʼicheʼ and Spanish. There are thermal baths with volcanic water around the town, for example Fuentes Georginas and Almolonga.

== Religion ==
Zunil possesses active worship of San Simón (also known as Maximón), a life-sized mannequin representing a Maya god, sitting in a wooden throne, which is moved to a different house every year, and many people visit and leave gifts at his shrine.

== Namesakes ==
A crater on Mars, which may be the source of Mars meteorites, is named after the village.

== Gallery ==
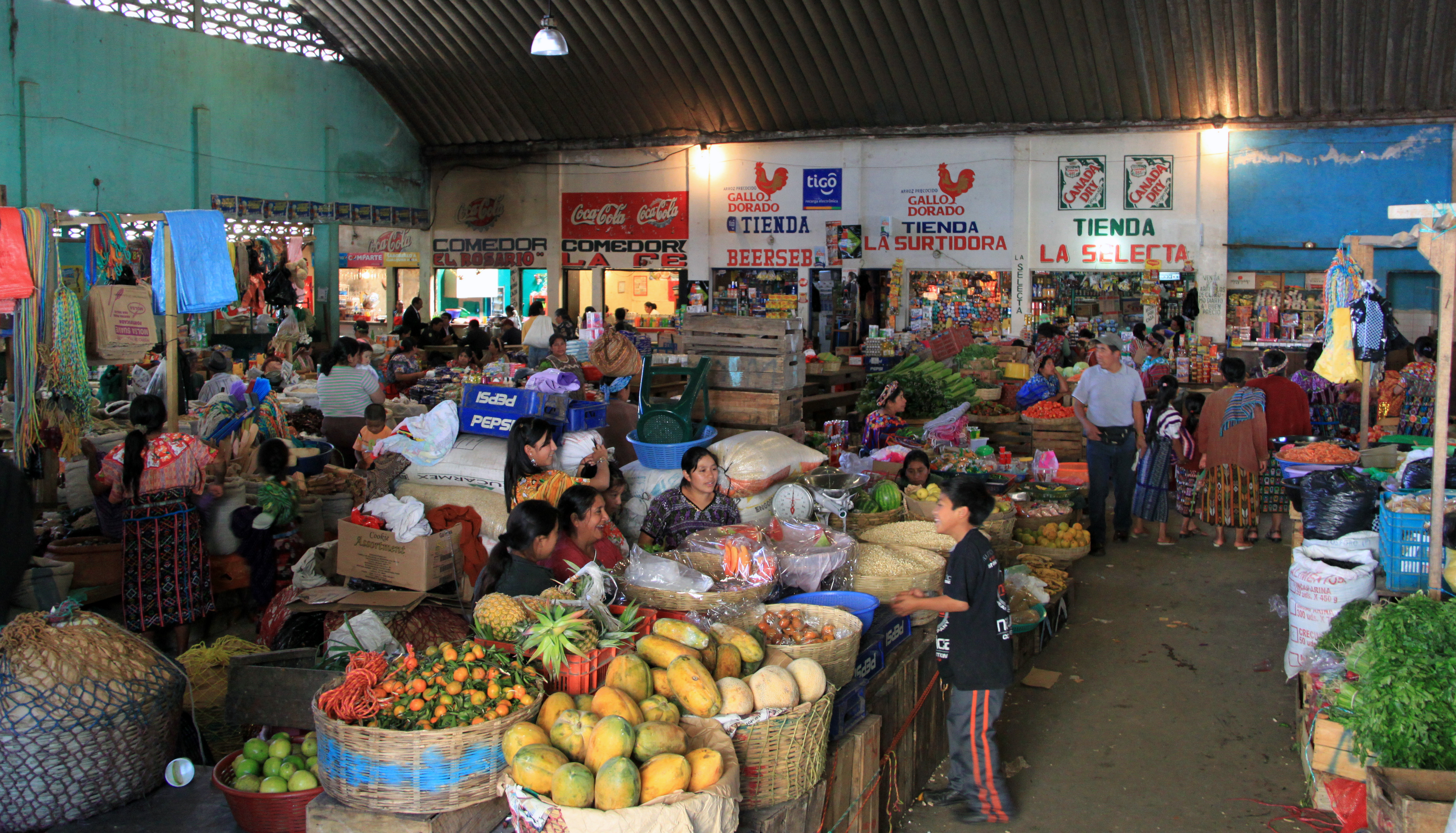
Indoor market

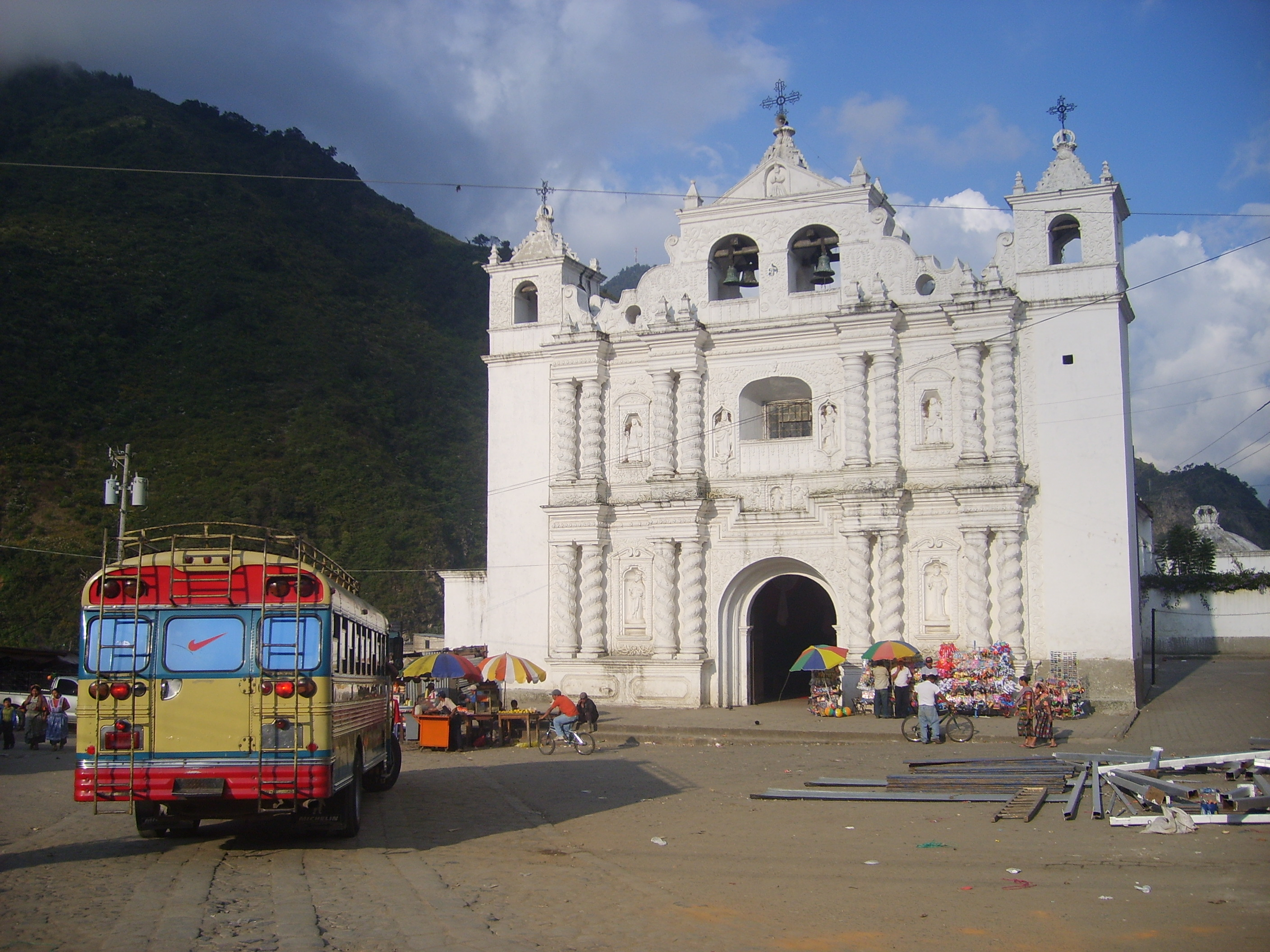
Church in Zunil

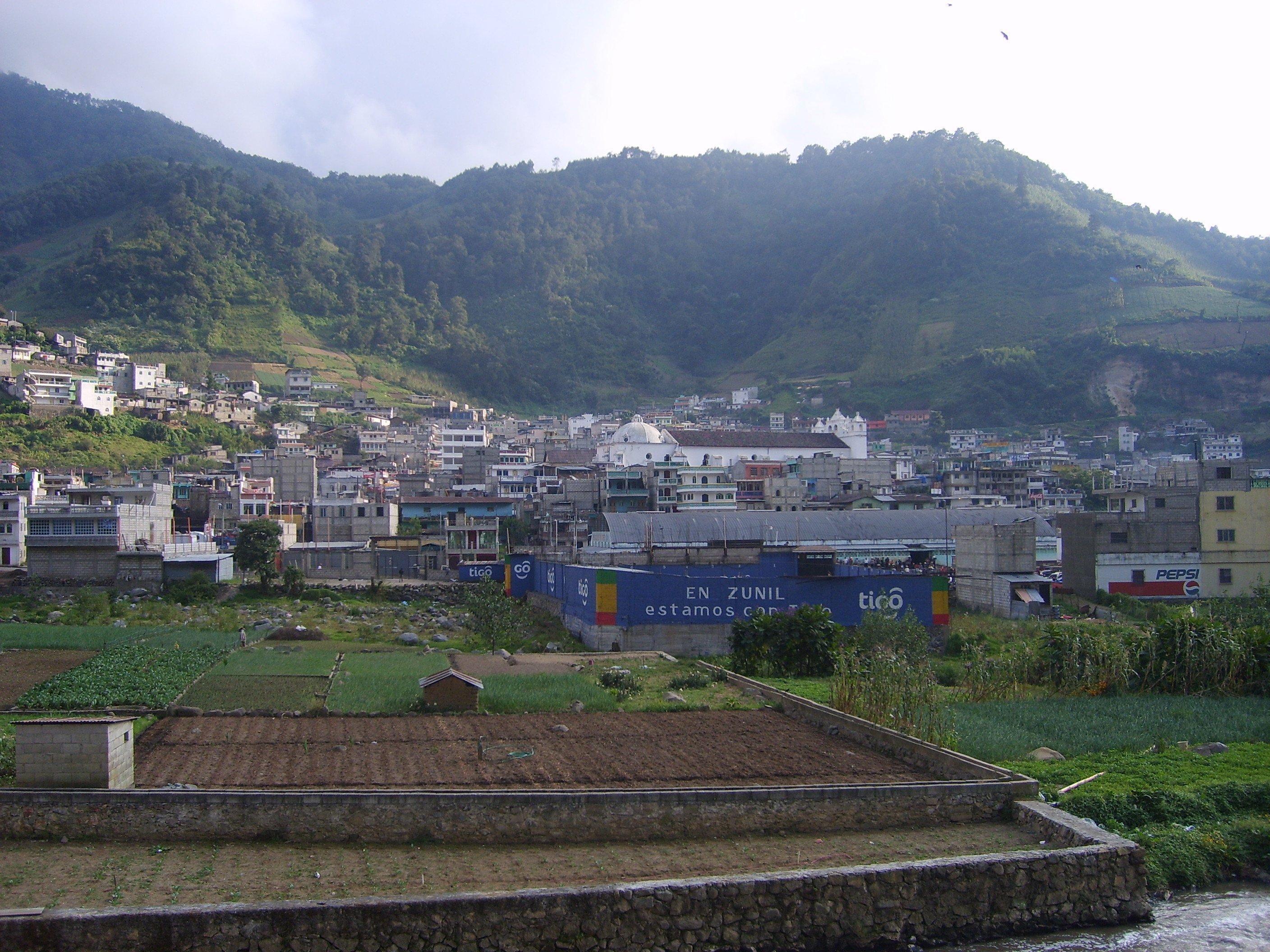
Panorama of Zunil

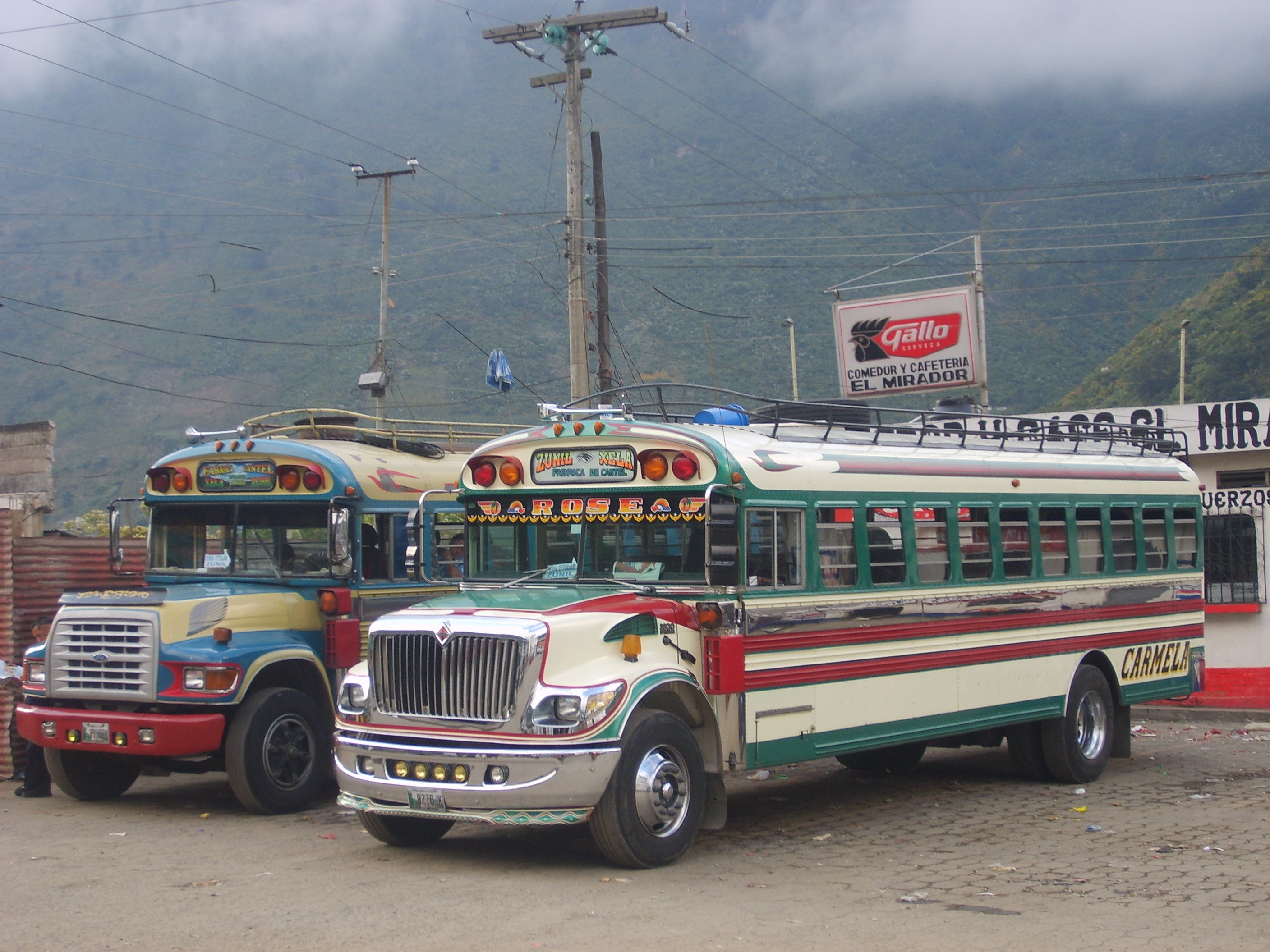
Buses in Zunil
