= Concepción Chiquirichapa =

Concepción Chiquirichapa Conspyon
- Municipality and town
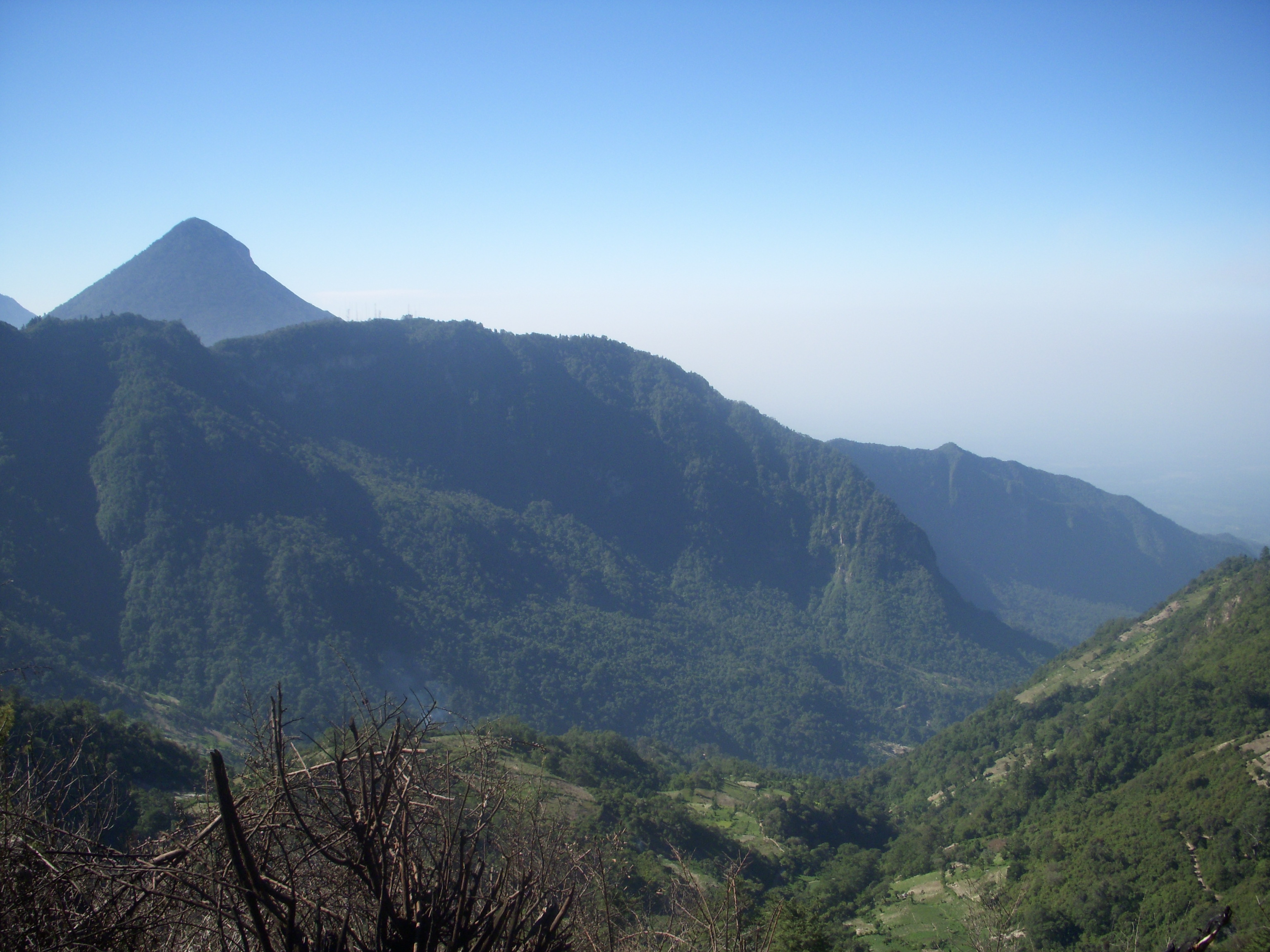
- Nickname: Conce
- Location within Guatemala
- Coordinates: 14°51′N 91°37′W
- Country: Guatemala
- Department: Quetzaltenango

Area
  - Municipality and town: 10.0 sq mi (25.9 km^{2})
  - Land: 10.0 sq mi (25.9 km^{2})
- Elevation: 8,415 ft (2,565 m)

Population (2018 census)
  - Municipality and town: 17,342
  - Density: 1,730/sq mi (670/km^{2})
  - Urban: 9,879
- Time zone: UTC+6 (Central Time)
- Climate: Cwb

Concepción Chiquirichapa (Spanish pronunciation: [konseβˈsjon tʃikiɾiˈtʃapa]) is a municipality in the Guatemalan department of Quetzaltenango in the Western Highlands of Guatemala, 14 kilometers west of the departmental capital of Quetzaltenango, and 214 kilometers west of the capital Guatemala City. The municipality has a population of 17,342 (2018 census), 98% of whom identify as indigenous Maya-Mam and speak a dialect of Southern Mam.

== History ==
=== Mercedarian doctrine ===
Mercedarian coat of arms.

After the Spanish conquest of Guatemala in the 1520s, the "Presentación de Guatemala" Mercedarian province was formed in 1565; originally, the order of the Blessed Virgin Mary of Mercy had gotten from bishop Francisco Marroquín several doctrines in the Sacatepéquez and Chimaltenango valleys, close to the capital Santiago de los Caballeros de Guatemala, but they traded those with the Order of Preachers friars in exchange for the doctrines those had in the Sierra de los Cuchumatanes area. During the first part of the 17th century they also had doctrine in four town close to the city of Santiago, which eventually became city neighborhoods: Espíritu Santo, Santiago, San Jerónimo and San Anton —which was the capital of the Mercedarians, where they had their convent, and where their comendador lived.

According to bishop Juan de las Cabezas memoir in 1613 and the bishop Pedro Cortés y Larraz parish visit minutes from 1770, the Mercedarians came to have nine doctrines, and numerous annexes, which were: Santa Ana de Malacatán, Concepción de Huehuetenango, San Pedro de Solomá, Nuestra Señora de la Purificación de Jacaltenango, Nuestra Señora de la Candelaria de Chiantla, San Andrés de Cuilco, Santiago de Tejutla, San Pedro de Sacatepéquez, and San Juan de Ostuncalco, to which Concepción Chiquirichapa belonged.

However, in 1754, due to the Bourbon Reforms implemented by the Spanish kings, the Mercedarins -and the rest of the regular clergy for that matter-, had to transfer their doctrines to the secular clergy, thus losing their San Juan Ostuncalco doctrine.

=== Legend of Chiquirichapa origin ===
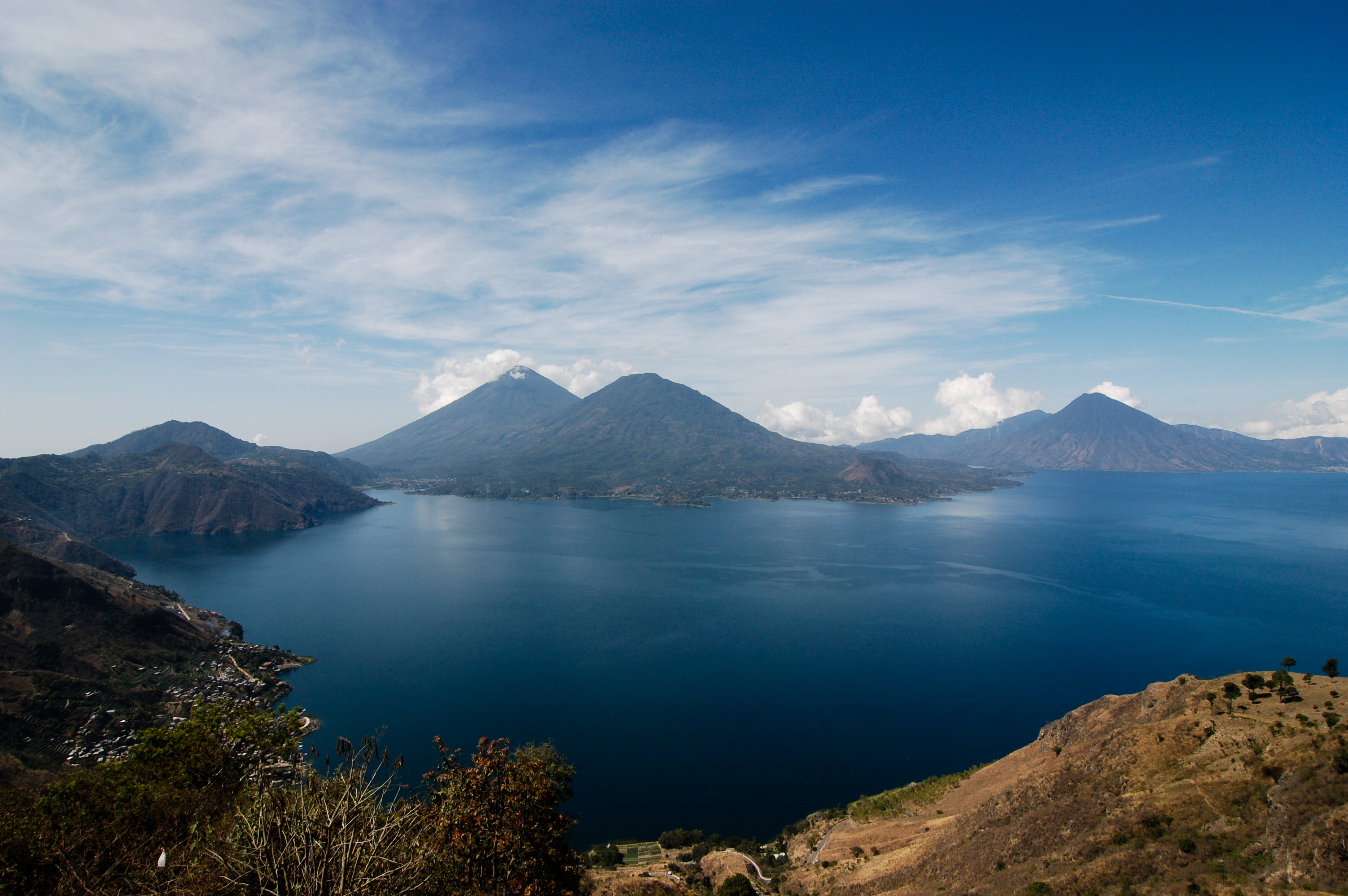
Lake Atitlan in Sololá Department, Guatemala. According to an ancient legend, this lake was formed when Concepción Chiquirichapa's cacique magically moved a lake bordering that town to Sololá.

There is a legend of the origin and formation of the municipality of Concepcion Chiquirichapa, which has been transmitted by oral tradition from generation to generation. The account says: In ancient times, the ancestors lived in this county on top of a hill located alongside the hill "Tuicacaix"; they started to build homes, then continued to work achieving complete the construction of a wooden church where they began to have their first religious activities. The town center was called by neighbors in the dialect "Mam" with the name "Twisak Bajlak" -which translated into English means "Place of White Shilote", being shilote a Guatemalan word for white corn-.

One day, while most of the men were working in the fields nearby, the housewives started noticing that several infants had disappeared in the community. Neighbors became concerned about the small children, for mothers could not look after their children all the time due to their housekeeping duties; finally, the whole community realized that giant birds called "Tiw" were responsible for several missing children in the community, and assumed that these predators had taken the little ones to their nests for food. The elders devised a mechanism to protect infants from birds: they would cover their heads with a basket, yet when one neglected to cover the infants, they were still being taken away by the giant birds.

The villagers were struggling to kill the predators because their nests were too high on the mountains; furthermore, these were located in a mountain where nobody had dare climbing before. However, some courageous people did climb and reported that the nests they found were like a "tunnel" with a diameter of about 2 m and unknown depth. In this situation, the settlers' cacique realized that they were forced to seek a new shelter, and sent several men to search for a suitable location; however, after a fruitless search, these men came back empty handed. Then, the cacique made use of his stick -which had magical powers- and placed it on top of a mountain called "To-xucuwe" to determinate whether it was suitable for occupancy, but when the mountain moved before the power of the stick, the cacique realized that it was not a good place to live. Faced with these two failed searches, the cacique and some companions walked up to the "Popbil" hill where the cacique planted the stick once more, and this time when the mountain did not move, everybody was overjoyed by having found a new site by the shore of the lake, a place where they once had buried their dead. The patrol returned to their settlement with the news that they had found a good area for refuge. When the town moved, they left behind only the remains of a church that still exists today and that in Mam language is called "Tui Glesbén" (English: "Place Where There was the Church").

The new place is where Concepción Chiquirichapa municipal capital stands in the 21st century; on this site, however, the natives had the same problem as the birds were still threatening their children. Given this, one day the strongest men met, determined to climb the mountain and fill the huge birds' nests, killing them. Finally, they were able to do so and solve that problem; but another issue affected the community now, also associated with infants: now the little ones would go into the lake and never come back. Faced with this new dilemma, the Principal used his power and formed long sticks or tubes and using a piece of cotton, begged the gods to make the lake water disappear down the tube; as soon as he finished his prayer, the cotton ball was completely soaked with the water and then the Principal placed the tubes facing East, forcing the water to go into the place that today is known as Lake Atitlan. Days after the water disappeared leaving a huge valley, the land dried and both problems were solved, for children could now leave their homes without the danger of being eaten by huge birds or disappear in the nearby lake.

All the surrounding land belonged to the natives of the original village of Chiquirichapa, but when population grew, the highest authority of the people ordered some to leave to care for the forests of the North and South, and over the years these new settlements turned into new communities, such as San Juan Ostuncalco, Cajolá, San Miguel Sigüilá, San Martín Sacatepéquez, Varsovia and Monrovia. All these town eventually became Quetzaltenango Department municipalities, with Chiquirichapa claiming to this day that it was the origen of them all."

== Etymology ==
Its etymology comes from the Nahuatl word "Chiquilichtl-a-pan", meaning "The stream of cicadas or locusts" and "Concepcion", a Catholic name given in honor of Virgen Mary. In 1860 the municipality was formed with the name of "Concepcion Chiquirichapa".

== Ethnicity, race and language ==
This group points to 17,342 inhabitants in the municipality of Concepcion Chiquirichapa are purely indigenous Mam. However it is also recorded there are some non-indigenous.

== Religion ==
The inhabitants of the municipality of Conception Chiquirichapa been identified with spirituality among the living is belief in a supreme being that governs the way the community. There is Evangelical or Protestant churches where the people come daily to ask u please to thank, to honor the Supreme Being according to their beliefs, there is the Catholic Church in colonial structure which receives every day Catholics to be focus for prayers to the Creator.

== Customs and traditions ==
The festivity is celebrated usually from 5 to 9 December, being the main day 7, when the church celebrates in honor of the Conception of the Virgin Mary. In the cultural aspect of this village, on December 7 leaving the Virgin Mary in procession through the principal streets and avenues of the great blessings municipal shedding according to the beliefs of this people, upon entering the procession takes place the burning of the fireworks every year that is being developed in the churchyard. On 8 and 9 December, entertainment perform several musical groups in the churchyard, so people celebrate the holiday of this people as tradition and custom of indigenous Mam. The second holiday of this county is carried out on July 22 in honor of "Our Lady of Magdalene."

=== Market day ===
The market is on Sundays and Thursdays in the city's main square. It is used for trade as well as the community found in sharing joys and sorrows with each other.

=== Traditional wardrobe ===
The costume worn by the women is the Huipil Red, black cut, strip, strip was produced by the same women in the municipality, the color is red huipil its meaning is the blood spilled by our ancestors cut the dark or black evening, the bar the nagual of Women, the belt force and purity of women.

=== Typical food and drink ===
Local dishes include pepi, Jocón, Beef tripe soup, chicken broth, bouillon pata broth, preserved beef chicken and egg dishes prepared with vegetables such as potatoes, huisquil, green beans and carrots, often served with tortillas. Traditional drinks include atol and other maize-based beverages.

== Climate ==
Concepción Chiquirichapa has a subtropical highland climate (Köppen: Cwb).

Climate data for Concepción Chiquirichapa
Month	Jan	Feb	Mar	Apr	May	Jun	Jul	Aug	Sep	Oct	Nov	Dec	Year
Mean daily maximum °C (°F)	16.6 (61.9)	17.3 (63.1)	18.7 (65.7)	19.7 (67.5)	19.3 (66.7)	18.3 (64.9)	18.2 (64.8)	18.7 (65.7)	18.1 (64.6)	17.4 (63.3)	17.4 (63.3)	16.9 (62.4)	18.1 (64.5)
Daily mean °C (°F)	9.2 (48.6)	9.7 (49.5)	11.0 (51.8)	12.7 (54.9)	13.8 (56.8)	13.5 (56.3)	13.3 (55.9)	13.2 (55.8)	13.3 (55.9)	12.5 (54.5)	11.1 (52.0)	10.1 (50.2)	11.9 (53.5)
Mean daily minimum °C (°F)	1.8 (35.2)	2.2 (36.0)	3.4 (38.1)	5.8 (42.4)	8.3 (46.9)	8.8 (47.8)	8.5 (47.3)	7.7 (45.9)	8.6 (47.5)	7.7 (45.9)	4.9 (40.8)	3.4 (38.1)	5.9 (42.7)
Average precipitation mm (inches)	4 (0.2)	5 (0.2)	14 (0.6)	50 (2.0)	186 (7.3)	247 (9.7)	183 (7.2)	204 (8.0)	284 (11.2)	170 (6.7)	24 (0.9)	7 (0.3)	1,378 (54.3)
Source: Climate-Data.org

== Geographic location ==
Concepción Chiquirichapa is completely surrounded by Quetzaltenango Department municipalities; it is located in the central part of the department of Quetzaltenango and how much with a land area of 48 square miles (120 km^{2}), the weather is cold. It lies at a distance of 18 km. of the departmental capital of Quetzaltenango and 237 km from capital Guatemala City.

== See also ==
- List of places in Guatemala

== Notes and references ==
=== Bibliography ===
- Cortés y Larraz, Pedro (1770). Descripción Geográfico-Moral de la Diócesis de Goathemala (in Spanish). Guatemala: Diócesis de Guatemala.
- Juarros, Domingo (1818). Compendio de la historia de la Ciudad de Guatemala (in Spanish). Guatemala: Ignacio Beteta.
- Pérez, Pedro Nolasco O. de M. (1966). Historia de las Misiones Mercedarias en América (in Spanish). Madrid.
- Tradición oral (2009). "Leyenda del origen de Concepción Chiquirichapa". Miconce.net (in Spanish). Quetzaltenango, Guatemala. Archived from the original on 9 October 2015.
