= Mam language =

Mayan language spoken in Guatemala and Mexico

Mam
- Qyool Mam, Ta yol Mam
- Native to: Guatemala, Mexico
- Region: Chiapas and Campeche, Mexico; Quetzaltenango, Huehuetenango, San Marcos, and Retalhuleu, Guatemala;
- Ethnicity: Mam
- Native speakers: 600,000 in Guatemala (2019 census); 10,000 in Mexico (2020 census)
- Language family: Mayan: Eastern Mayan; Greater Mamean; Mamean; Mam
- Dialects: Northern Mam; Central Mam; Soconusco Mam; Western Mam; Southern Mam
- Writing system: Latin

Official status
- Recognised minority language in: Mexico; Guatemala
- Regulated by: Instituto Nacional de Lenguas Indígenas; Comunidad Lingüística Mam (COLIMAM)

Language codes
- ISO 639-3: mam
- Glottolog: mamm1241
- ELP: Mam
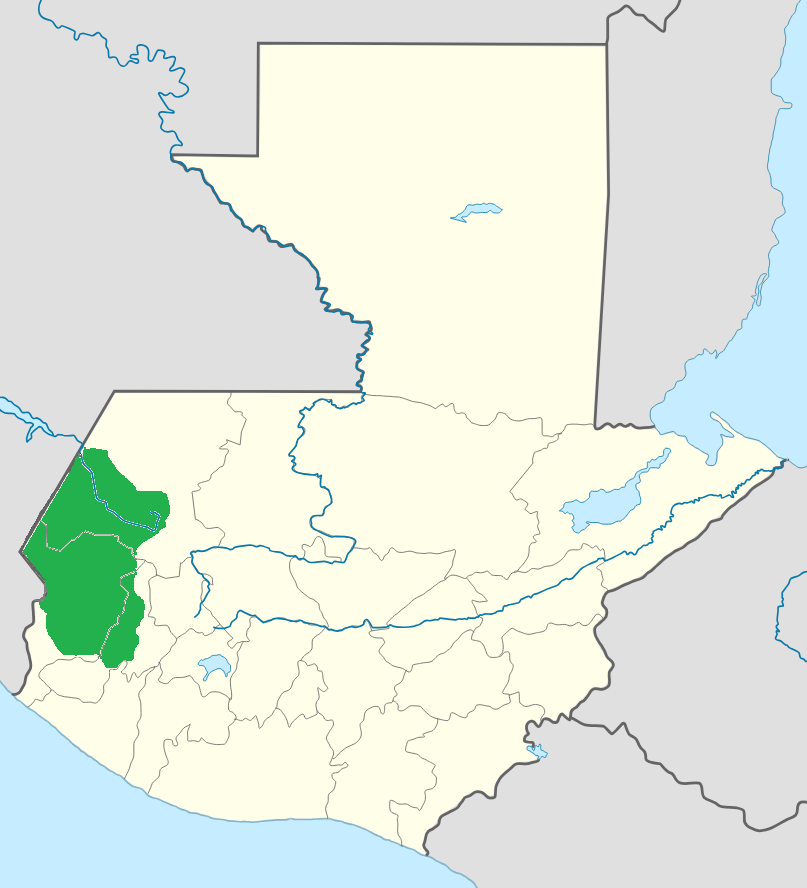
- Extent of the Mam language in Guatemala

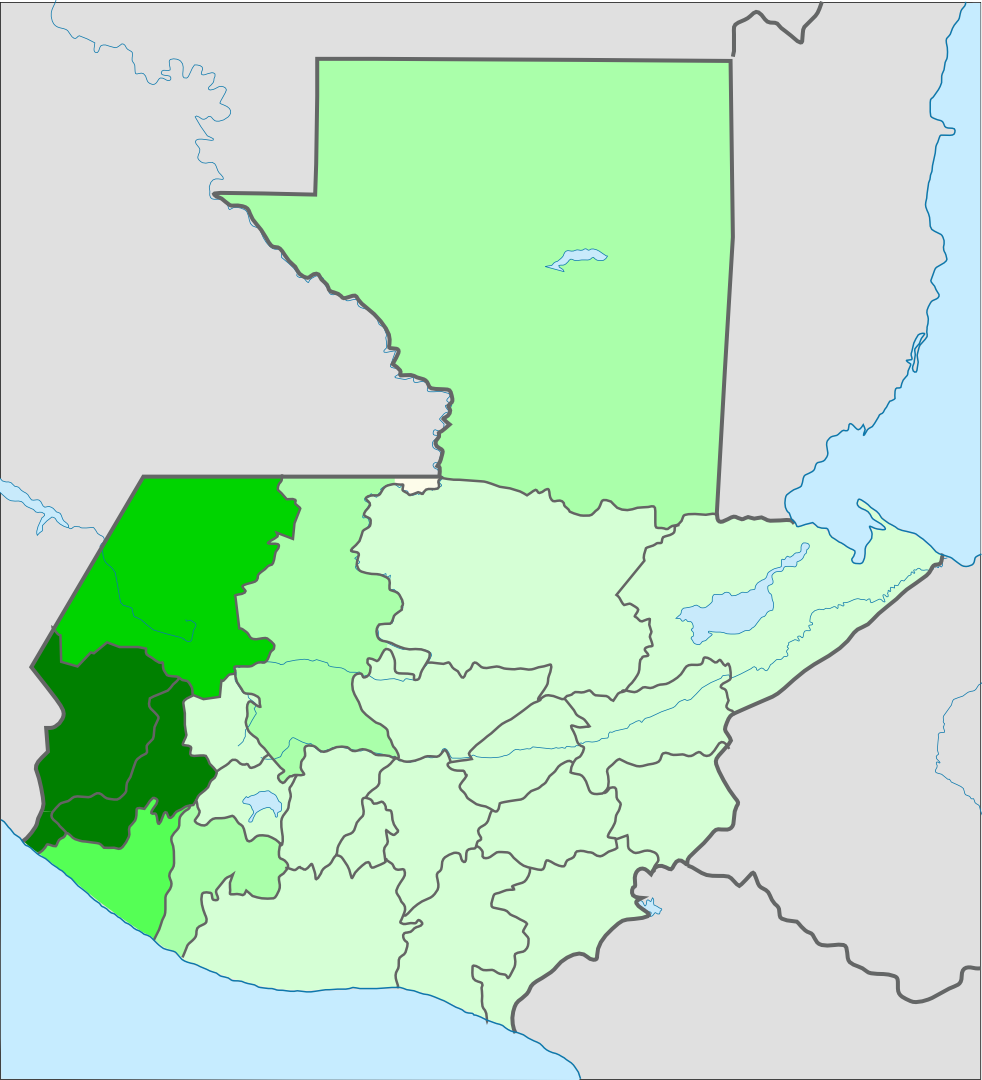
Map of Mam speakers by department Below 1% 1–5% 5–10% 10–20%

Mam is a Mayan language spoken by about half a million Mam people in the Guatemalan departments of Quetzaltenango, Huehuetenango, San Marcos, and Retalhuleu, and the Mexican states of Campeche and Chiapas. Thousands more make up a Mam diaspora throughout the United States and Mexico, with notable populations living in Oakland, California and Washington, D.C. The most extensive Mam grammar is Nora C. England's A grammar of Mam, a Mayan language (1983), which is based on the San Ildefonso Ixtahuacán dialect of Huehuetenango Department.

== Classification ==
Mam is closely related to the Tektitek language, and the two languages together form the Mamean sub-branch of the Mayan language family. Along with the Ixilan languages, Awakatek and Ixil, these make up the Greater Mamean sub-branch, one of the two branches of the Eastern Mayan languages (the other being the Greater Quichean sub-branch, which consists of 10 Mayan languages, including Kʼicheʼ).

== Dialects ==
Because contact between members of different Mam communities is somewhat limited, the language varies considerably even from village to village. Nevertheless, mutual intelligibility, though difficult, is possible through practice.

Mam varieties within Mexico and Guatemala are divided into five dialect groups:

- Northern Mam in Campeche, Mexico and southern Huehuetenango Department, Guatemala. Northern Mam is the least conservative group according to Terrence Kaufman.
- Southern Mam in southern Campeche, Mexico and Quetzaltenango Department, San Marcos Department, and Retalhuleu Department, Guatemala.
- Central Mam in Chiapas, Mexico and San Marcos Department, Guatemala.
- Western Mam in eastern Chiapas, Mexico and northwestern San Marcos Department, Guatemala. The Tektitek language may be mutually intelligible with Western Mam dialects.
- Soconusco Mam in the Soconusco region, Chiapas, Mexico

In addition to these, the dialects of Chiapas, Mexico are characterized by significant grammatical as well as lexical differences from the Guatemalan varieties.

== Geographic distribution ==
Mam is spoken in 64 communities in four Guatemalan departments and numerous communities in Campeche and Chiapas, Mexico. Neighboring languages include Jakaltek and Qʼanjobʼal to the north, Tektitek and Qato'k to the west, and Ixil, Awakatek, Sipacapense, and Kʼicheʼ to the east.

Quetzaltenango Department

- San Miguel Sigüilá
- Concepción Chiquirichapa
- Génova
- El Palmar
- San Juan Ostuncalco
- Cajolá
- San Martín Sacatepéquez
- Colomba
- Flores Costa Cuca
- Huitán
- Palestina de Los Altos
- Cabricán

Huehuetenango Department

- San Ildefonso Ixtahuacán
- Cuilco
- Tectitán
- San Pedro Necta
- San Sebastián Huehuetenango
- Malacatancito
- Todos Santos Cuchumatán
- San Rafael Petzal
- Colotenango
- Santa Bárbara
- San Juan Atitán
- Aguacatán
- San Gaspar Ixchil
- La Libertad
- La Democracia
- Huehuetenango
- Chiantla
- Santiago Chimaltenango
- San Juan Ixcoy

San Marcos Department

- San Antonio Sacatepéquez
- San Lorenzo
- Tejutla
- San Rafael Pie de La Cuesta
- San Pedro Sacatepéquez
- La Reforma
- El Quetzal
- Sibinal
- San José Ojetenam
- Pajapita
- San Cristobal Cucho
- Nuevo Progreso
- San Marcos
- Concepción Tutuapa
- San Pablo
- Ixchiguan
- San Miguel Ixtahuacán
- Tacaná
- Tajumulco
- Catarina
- Esquipulas Palo Gordo
- Malacatán
- Río Blanco
- Comitancillo

Retalhuleu Department

- El Xaw
- Santa Ines
- Sibaná
- San Miguelito
- Nueva Cajolá
- San Roque

Chiapas

- Motozintla
- Tapachula
- Acaxman
- Bejucal de Ocampo
- Frontera Comalapa
- Mazapa de Madero
- Escuintla
- Chicomuselo
- Siltepec
- La Grandeza
- Unión Juárez
- Bella Vista
- El Porvenir
- Cacahoatán
- Tuzantán
- Tuxtla Chico
- Huixtla
- Huehuetán
- Amatenango de la Frontera
- Tuxchamén

Campeche

- Champotón
- Campeche
- Santo Domingo Kesté
- Quetzal-Edzná
- Mayatecúm
- Gumarcaaj

== Phonology ==
=== Stress ===
Mam has weight sensitive stress assignment. Primary stress falls on the long vowel in a word if there is one, e.g. aq'ú:ntl 'work'. Words without a long vowel assign primary stress to the vowel preceding the last glottal stop, e.g. puʔláʔ 'dipper'. Words without a long vowel or a glottal stop assign stress to the vowel preceding the last consonant in the root, e.g. xpicháqʼ 'raccoon'. Stress is not assigned to suffixes or enclitics that do not have long vowels or a glottal stop.

=== Vowels ===
Mam has 10 vowels, 5 short and 5 long:

		Front	Central	Back
Close	Long	iː ⟨ii⟩		uː ⟨uu⟩
Close	Short	ɪ ⟨i⟩		ʊ ⟨u⟩
Mid	Long	eː ⟨ee⟩		oː ⟨oo⟩
Mid	Short	ɛ ⟨e⟩		ɔ ⟨o⟩
Open	Long		aː ⟨aa⟩	
Open	Short		a ⟨a⟩	

- A mid-central vowel [ə] is an allophone of a short unstressed vowel that can occur in the syllable following a stressed long vowel.

=== Consonants ===
Mam has 27 consonants, including the glottal stop:

		Bilabial	Alveolar	Postalveolar	Retroflex	Palatal	Velar		Uvular	Glottal
		Bilabial	Alveolar	Postalveolar	Retroflex	Palatal	Plain	Palatalized	Uvular	Glottal
Nasal		m ⟨m⟩	n ⟨n⟩				(ŋ ⟨n⟩)			
Plosive	Plain	p ⟨p⟩	t ⟨t⟩				k ⟨k⟩	kʲ ⟨ky⟩	q ⟨q⟩	ʔ ⟨ʼ⟩
Plosive	Ejective		tʼ~ɗ̥ ⟨tʼ⟩				kʼ ⟨kʼ⟩	kʲʼ ⟨kyʼ⟩		ʔ ⟨ʼ⟩
Plosive	Implosive	ɓ~ɓ̥ ⟨bʼ⟩	tʼ~ɗ̥ ⟨tʼ⟩						ʛ̥ ⟨qʼ⟩	
Affricate	Plain		t͡s ⟨tz⟩	t͡ʃ ⟨ch⟩	ʈ͡ʂ ⟨tx⟩					
Affricate	Ejective		t͡sʼ ⟨tzʼ⟩	t͡ʃʼ ⟨chʼ⟩	ʈ͡ʂʼ ⟨txʼ⟩					
Fricative			s ⟨s⟩	ʃ ⟨ẍ (xh)⟩	ʂ ⟨x⟩				χ ⟨j⟩	
Flap			ɾ ⟨r⟩							
Approximant			l ⟨l⟩			j ⟨y⟩	w ⟨w⟩			

- Stops and affricates /p, t, t͡s, t͡ʃ, t͡ʂ, k, q/ are aspirated [Cʰ] in word-final position.
- Todos Santos Mam has additional apical palato-alveolar consonants /t̺͡ʃ̺ʰ, t̺͡ʃ̺ʼ, ʃ̺/.

=== Syllable structure ===
Most roots take the morphological shape CVC. The only possible root final consonant cluster is -nC. Syllables can have up to four consonants in a cluster in any position. Most consonant clusters are the result of vowel dropping and morpheme addition.

== Morphology ==
Mam has two sets of agreement markers, known to Mayanists as Set A and Set B markers, which can appear on both nouns and verbs. Mam uses Set A (ergative) markers on nouns to mark possessor agreement and on verbs to cross-reference the transitive subject. Mam uses Set B (absolutive) markers on transitive verbs to cross-reference the object and on intransitive verbs to cross-reference the subject. Below is a table of Set A (ergative) and Set B (absolutive) prefixes from England.

Mam Set A and Set B Pronominal Markers
Person	Set A	Set B	Enclitics
1s	n- ~ w-	chin-	-a ~ -ya
2s	t-	Ø ~ tz- ~ tzʼ- ~ k-	-a ~ -ya
3s	t-	Ø ~ tz- ~ tzʼ- ~ k-	–
1p (excl.)	q-	qo-	-a ~ -ya
1p (incl.)	q-	qo-	–
2p	ky-	chi-	-a ~ -ya
3p	ky-	chi-	–

Phonologically conditioned allomorphs are as follows.

- n- ~ w-
  - n- /__C
  - w- /__V
- Ø ~ tz- ~ tzʼ- ~ k-
  - k- /potential
  - tzʼ- /__V initial root, non-potential
  - tz- /__uul 'arrive here', iky' 'pass by', non-potential
  - Ø- /__C, non-potential
- -a ~ -ya
  - -ya /V__ ; In the first person in post-vowel environments, -ya varies freely with -kyʼa and -y'.
  - -a /C__

Some paradigmatic examples from England (1983) are given below. Note that "Ø-" designates a null prefix. Additionally, ma is an aspectual word meaning 'recent past'.

Set A markers + NOUN
jaa	'house'
n-jaa-ya	'my house'
t-jaa-ya	'your house'
t-jaa	'his/her house'
q-jaa-ya	'our (not your) house'
q-jaa	'our (everyone's) house'
ky-jaa-ya	'you (pl)'s house'
ky-jaa	'their house'

Set B markers + VERB
bʼeet-	**to walk**
ma chin bʼeet-a	'I walked.'
ma Ø-bʼeet-a	'You walked.'
ma Ø-bʼeet	'He/she walked.'
ma qo bʼeet-a	'We (not you) walked.'
ma qo bʼeet	'We all walked'
ma chi bʼeet-a	'You all walked.'
ma chi bʼeet	'They walked.'

=== Mam verb complex ===
Verbs in Mam can include inflection for person, aspect and mode, as well as auxiliaries in the form of directionals. The verb complex has distinct forms for transitive and intransitive verb stems depending in part on whether the complex cross-references one or two arguments. The lexical status of the verb complex is ambiguous. The inflections with vowels are phonologically independent (indicated by spaces). Transitive verb complexes with directionals have a dependent suffix. Two of England's examples of intransitive and transitive verb complexes are shown below.

Intransitive verb complex with directional

ma chin jaw tz'aq-a
REC ABS.1.SG DIR slip-ENC
"I slipped (just now)."

Transitive verb complex with directional

(ok) k-kub'-l-tz t-tzyu-ʔn-a
POT ABS.3.SG-DIR-POT-DIR ERG.2.SG-grab-DEP-ENC
"You will grab them."

Mam extends the Set A (ergative) person markers in the context of focused adverbials and certain subordinate clauses. In these contexts, the Set A markers cross-reference the subject of intransitive verbs and both the subject and object of transitive verbs. The following examples show the extended ergative marker /t-/ in bold.

Intransitive verb complex with extended ergative marking

n-chi ooq' t-poon ky-txuuʔ
PROG-ABS.3.PL cry ERG.3.SG-arrive ERG.3.PL-mother
"They were crying when their mother arrived."

Transitive verb complex with extended ergative marking

ok t-kuʔ-x ky-awa-ʔn xjaal kjoʔn b'iʔx n-0-xiʔ cheenaq' t-iʔj
When ERG.3.SG-dir-dir ERG.3.PL-plant-DEP person cornfield all_at_once PROG-ABS.3.SG-go bean ERG.3.SG-REL.PAT
"When the people plant (it) in the cornfield at the same time the beans go in."

=== Verb morphemes ===
**Transitive verbal affixes**

- -bʼaa 'transitivizer' (vowel length can also be used)
- -laa 'applicative'
- -wa 'applicative'
- -bʼV 'causative'
- -chV 'causative' (variants: -chaa, -chii, -chuu)
- -kʼuu 'causative'
- -lV 'causative'
- -mV 'causative'
- -nV 'causative'
- -pV 'causative'
- -qʼV 'causative'
- -saa 'causative'
- -tzii 'causative'
- -tzʼV 'causative'
- -txʼii 'causative'
- -wV 'causative'
- -najee' 'repetitive'
- -'kJ 'processive'
- -'tz 'processive imperative'

**Intransitive verbal affixes**

- -n 'antipassive'
- -Vn 'affect'
- -ax 'versive'
- -ee' 'versive'
- -eet 'passive'
- -j 'passive'
- -njtz 'passive'
- -bʼaj 'processive passive'
- -bʼa 'intransitivizer'
- -ch 'intransitivizer'
- -chaj 'intransitivizer'
- -paj 'intransitivizer'
- -t 'intransitivizer'
- -tzʼaj 'intransitivizer'
- -tzʼaq 'intransitivizer'
- -' ... -al 'specific termination'

**Other verbal affixes**

- -l 'infinitive'

**Aspects**

Mam verbs have 6 aspects that are prefixed to the verb root.

- ma 'recent past'
- o 'past'
- ok 'potential' (not obligatory)
- n- 'progressive'
- x- 'recent past dependent' (used in subordinate clauses)
- Ø- 'past dependent' (used in subordinate clauses)

**Modes**

- Potential transitive: -a'
- Potential intransitive: -l
- Imperative: -m (-n before directionals)

**Directionals**

Directionals are auxiliary elements in verb phrases. They are derived from intransitive verbs.

- xi 'away from'
- tzaj 'toward'
- ul 'there to here'
- pon 'here to there'
- kubʼ 'down'
- jaw 'up'
- el 'out'
- ok 'in'
- kyaj 'remaining'
- aj 'returning from here'
- ikyʼ 'passing'
- bʼaj 'complete'

=== Pronouns ===
Mam has no independent pronouns. Rather, pronouns in Mam always exist as bound morphemes.

=== Nouns ===
The Mam language displays inalienable possession. Certain Mam nouns cannot be possessed, such as kya'j 'sky' and che'w 'star'. On the other hand, some Mam nouns are always possessed, such as t-lokʼ 'its root' and t-bʼaqʼ 'its seed'.

Noun phrase structure can be summarized into the following template.

**Demonstrative**	**Number**	**Measure**	**Plural**	**Possessive affixes**	**NOUN**; **ROOT**	**Possessor**	**Adjective**	**Relative clause**

The plural clitic is qa.

**Noun affixes**

- aj- 'agent'
- aj- 'native'
- -l 'agentive'
- -eenj 'patient'
- -bʼil 'instrumental'
- -bʼeen 'resultant locative'
- -bʼan 'reminder'
- -al 'abstract noun'
- -abʼiil 'abstract noun'
- -leen 'abstract noun'
- -le'n 'abstract noun'
- -an 'ordinal'
- -bʼji'bʼil 'nominalizer'
- -bʼal 'nominalizer'
- -bʼatz 'nominalizer'
- -l 'nominalizer'
- -tl 'nominalizer'
- -tz 'nominalizer'

**Relational noun affixes**

- -u'n 'agent, instrument, causative'
- -ee 'dative, possessive, patient, benefactive'
- -i'j 'patient, thematic'
- -uukʼal 'instrument, comitative'
- -iibʼaj 'reflexive'

**Locative affixes**

- -bʼutxʼ 'at the corner'
- -i'jla 'around'
- -iibʼaj 'over'
- -jaqʼ 'under'
- -txa'n 'at the edge of'
- -txlaj 'beside'
- -tzii' 'at the entrance of'
- -uj 'in'
- -witz 'on top of'
- -wi' 'on, at the tip of'

**Classifiers**

- jal 'non-human'
- nu'xh 'baby'
- xhlaaqʼ 'child'
- bʼixh 'person of the same status (intimate)'
- qʼa 'young man'
- txin 'young woman'
- ma 'man'
- xu'j 'woman'
- swe'j 'old man'
- xhyaa' 'old woman'
- xnuq 'old man (respectful)'
- xuj 'old man (respectful)'

**Measure words**

Measure words quantify mass nouns.

- baas 'glassful' (< Spanish vaso)
- ma'l 'shot of liquor'
- laq 'plateful'
- pixh 'piece'
- txut 'drop'
- ba'uj 'a lot'

=== Numerals ===
San Ildefonso Ixtahuacán Mam numbers are as follows. Numbers above twenty are rarely used in Ixtahuacán and are usually only known by elderly speakers. Although the number system would have originally been vigesimal (i.e., base 20), the present-day number system of Ixtahuacán is now decimal.

Numeral	Word
1	juun
2	kabʼ
3	oox
4	kyaaj
5	jweʼ
6	qaq
7	wuuq
8	wajxaq
9	bʼelaj
10	laaj
20	wiinqan
40	kyaʼwnaq
60	oxkʼaal
80	junmutxʼ

== Syntax ==
Mam has both verbal and non-verbal types of sentences. Verbal sentences have verbal predicates, whereas non-verbal sentences have a stative or a locative/existential predicate. Verbal predicates have an aspect marker, while non-verbal predicates do not have aspect marking. Both verbal and non-verbal predicates occur in sentence-initial position unless a focused or topicalized phrase is present.

=== Verbal predicates ===
Verbal predicates are either transitive or intransitive according to the number of arguments cross-referenced in the verb complex. The number of arguments cross-referenced by the verb complex is not consistent with the transitivity of the verb root or the number of participants in an event. England notes examples of transitive verb roots that only appear in their antipassive or passive forms where they only cross-reference a single participant.

- Transitive verb root with obligatory antipassive voice

ma-yax 0-jejeeya-n xuʔj t-uj nim-b'ee
REC-INTENS ABS.3.SG-laugh-AP woman ERG.3.SG-REL/in big-road
"The woman laughed a lot in the road."

- Transitive verb root with obligatory passive voice

ma 0-kan-eet jun n-sentaabi-ya t-uj tz'iis
REC ABS.3.SG-find-PAS one ERG.1.SG-cent-ENC ERG.3.SG-REL/in garbage
"I found my penny in the garbage." (Lit. "My penny was found in the garbage")

Another possibility is the use of intransitive motion verbs to express transitive events.

- Intransitive motion verbs expressing transitive events

k-tzaaj-al aʔ w-uʔn-a
ABS.3.SG-come-POT water ERG.1.SG-REL/agent-ENC
"I will bring water." (Lit. "Water will come by me.")

t-wiixh o 0-kub' t-ee ich'
ERG.3.SG-cat PAST ABS.3.SG-go_down ERG.3.SG-REL/patient mouse
"His cat killed mice." (Lit. "His cat went down at mice.")

The basic word order in verbal sentences with two nominal arguments is VSO. Other word orders are not acceptable.

ma 0-kub' ky-tzyu-ʔn xiinaq cheej
REC ABS.3.SG-DIR ERG.3.PL-grab-DEP man horse
"The men grabbed the horse."

If only one argument appears in a transitive sentence and the argument is compatible with either person marker on the verb, it has a patient interpretation.

ma 0-kub' ky-tzyu-ʔn xiinaq
REC ABS.3.SG-DIR ERG.3.PL-grab-DEP man
"They grabbed the man." (Not "The men grabbed it.")

Mam speakers use a higher proportion of intransitive sentences than speakers of other Mayan languages. England and Martin (2003) found a low frequency of transitive sentences in Mam texts. Pye (2017) found a low use of overt subjects in transitive sentences in adults speaking to children. One adult produced overt subjects in 6% of transitive sentences. The same adult produced overt subjects in 41% of intransitive sentences and produced overt objects in 49% of transitive sentences.

=== Non-verbal predicates ===
Mam adds Set B person markers to nouns and adjectives to form non-verbal predicates. The following Set B person markers are used for non-verbal predicates (i.e., nouns, adjectives). Also, in statives, aa can be omitted when the rest of the stative is a non-enclitic (in other words, a separate, independent word).

Mam Set B Pronominal Markers (non-verbal predicates)
Person	Stative	Locative / Existental
1s	(aa) qiin-a	(a)t-iin-a
2s	aa-ya	(a)t-(aʼ-y)a
3s	aa	(a)t-(aʼ)
1p (excl.)	(aa) qoʼ-ya	(a)t-oʼ-ya
1p (incl.)	(aa) qoʼ	(a)t-oʼ
2p	aa-qa-ya	(a)t-eʼ-ya
3p	aa-qa	(a)t-eʼ

Paradigmatic examples of non-verbal predicates from England (1983) are given below.

NOUN + Set B markers
xjaal	person
xjaal qiin-a	'I am a person.'
xjaal-a	'You are a person.'
xjaal	'He/she is a person.'
xjaal qoʼ-ya	'We (excl.) are persons.'
xjaal qo-	'We (incl.) are persons.'
xjaal qa-ya	'You all are persons.'
xjaal qa	'They are persons.'

ADJECTIVE + Set B markers
sikynaj	tired
sikynaj qiin-a	'I am tired.'
sikynaj-a	'You are tired.'
sikynaj	'He/she is tired.'
sikynaj qoʼ-ya	'We (excl.) are tired.'
sikynaj qoʼ	'We (incl.) are tired.'
sikynaj qa-ya	'You all are tired.'
sikynaj qa	'They are tired.'

== Child language acquisition ==
An overview of child language acquisition in Mam can be found in Pye (2017). Child language data for Mam challenge many theories of language acquisition and demonstrate the need for more extensive documentation of native American languages.

Children acquiring Mam produce a higher proportion of verbs than children acquiring K’iche’, but a lower proportion of verbs compared to children acquiring Wastek and Chol. They produce a higher proportion of intransitive verbs relative to transitive verbs than children acquiring other Mayan languages (Pye, Pfeiler and Mateo Pedro 2017:22). Their high proportion of relational noun production is tied to their frequent use of intransitive verbs.

The following examples illustrate the children's use of intransitive verbs to express events with two participants. Ages are shown as (years;months.days). WEN (2;0.2) used the intransitive verb -kub’ ("go_down") in reference to an event of picking coffee. She used the relational noun phrase t-uʔn-a to express the agent in an oblique phrase. CRU (2;5.12) used the intransitive verb -el ("go_out") in reference to an event of taking out an object. She used the relational noun phrase w-uʔn-a to express the agent. JOS (2;6.17) used the intransitive verb -b’aj ("finish") in reference to finishing a drink. He used the possessive prefix on the noun k’aʔ ("drink")to express the agent. The examples overturn the hypothesis that children tie their use of transitive verbs to object manipulation events.

- WEN (2;0.2)

{} {} kuʔ pe tuʔn?
ma pa 0-kub’ kape t-uʔn-a?
REC already ABS.3.SG-go_down coffee ERG.2.SG-by-ENC
"Did you already pick the coffee?" (Lit. "Did the coffee already go down by you?")

- CRU (2;5.12)

{} nech woona.
ntiʔ n-0-el-tzaj w-uʔn-a.
NEG PROG-ABS.3.SG-go.out-come ERG.1.SG-by-ENC
"I can’t get it to come out." (Lit. "It is not coming out by me.")

- JOS (2;6.17)

kal kama paj?
tqal {t-k’aʔ ma} n-0-b’aj?
what {ERG.3.SG-drink COMP} PROG-ABS.3.SG-finish
"What is he drinking?" (Lit. "What is his drink that is finishing?")

Two-year-old Mam children produce the consonants /m, n, p, t, t͡ʃ, k, ʔ, l, j and w/. They produce [ʔ] in place of glottalized stops, [p] in place of /ɓ/, [k] in place of /kʲ/ and /q/, [t͡ʃ] in place of /t͡s/ and /ʈ͡ʂ/, [ʃ] in place of /ʂ/, and [l] in place of /ɾ/. Mam children begin producing ejective consonants after they are three and a half years old. The early production of /t͡ʃ/ and /l/ in Mam, as well as the late production of /s/, overturns predictions that all children have similar phonologies due to articulatory development.

The acquisition of morphology in Mam is heavily influenced by prosody. Two-year-old children favor the production of word syllables with primary stress, and most often produce syllables with the form CVC. Children do not consistently produce inflectional prefixes on nouns and verbs before they are four years old, although two-year-olds frequently produce verb suffixes, including the directional suffixes. Their production of the directional suffixes is evidence that two-year-old Mam children understand the complex grammatical constraints on the use of directionals. They distinguish between the use of the directional clitics and directional suffixes in indicative and imperative verbs. Two-year-old Mam speakers omit the person enclitic on nouns and verbs despite its high frequency of use in adult speech.

The following examples illustrate WEN’s verb complex production. In (1), WEN produced the vowel /a/ from the verb root -q'a ("give"), the imperative suffix -n, and the directional suffix -tz as /xh/. (Many directionals have contracted forms as suffixes.). WEN omitted the person enclitic -a. In (2), WEN produced the progressive prefix n-, the vowel /e/ from the verb root -el ("go out"), a spurious /n/, and the directional suffix -tz as /ch/. The intransitive verb -el belongs to the class of motion verbs that take directional suffixes. Intransitive verbs outside of the class of motion verbs do not take directional suffixes except in imperative contexts. The verb -el contracts with the directional suffix -tz to produce the stem -etz ("go out to") in adult speech. WEN’s omission of the person enclitic and production of a spurious consonant overturn the hypothesis that children produce forms that are frequent in adult speech.

- WEN (1;9.2)

aanxh!
0-q’a-n-tzaj-a
ERG.2.SG-give-IMP.TV-hither-ENC
"Give it!")

- WEN (1;8.21)

nench.
n-0-el-tzaj
PROG-ABS.3.SG-go_out-hither
"She is going out toward something")

The children’s production of the directional suffixes demonstrates their early recognition of the distinction between intransitive and transitive verbs in Mam. This distinction is a core feature of Mam grammar, and underpins the ergative morphology on the verbs and nouns. The semantic diversity of the verbs and positionals overturns the hypothesis that children use prototypical activity scenes as a basis for constructing grammatical categories. The children’s grammatical acumen is best seen in their use of the ergative and absolutive agreement markers on verbs. The children produced the prevocalic allomorphs of the ergative markers in nearly all of their obligatory contexts. They produced the preconsonantal allomorphs of the ergative markers in 20% of their obligatory contexts.

Two-year-old Mam children display a remarkable awareness of the contexts for extending the use of ergative markers to cross-reference the subject of intransitive verbs. Outside of these contexts, they consistently produced absolutive person markers on intransitive verbs. Three Mam children produced ergative person markers on intransitive verbs in half of the obligatory contexts for extended ergativity. The children’s awareness of the contexts for extended ergative use is all the more remarkable because the contexts are tied to clauses in dependent contexts in which aspect is not overtly marked. The following example shows JOS’s use of extended ergative marking (in bold) on the intransitive verb -ok ("go_in") in a purpose clause headed by the adverb ii ("so that"). The children’s production of ergative markers on intransitive verbs in dependent contexts overturns the theory that children link ergative markers to the subjects of transitive verbs in all contexts.

- JOS (2;6.14)

i tok mahʔ.
i t-ok mal...
so_that ERG.3.SG-go_in CL
"So that it is put..."

Mam two-year-olds produce sentences with a predicate-initial word order. The children, like adults, rarely produce the subject argument in transitive sentences. The Mam children show an ergative pattern of argument production that similar to the adult pattern. The children produced subject arguments in 7 percent or fewer of sentences with transitive verbs. The children produced subject arguments in 40 percent of sentences with intransitive verbs, and produced object arguments in 45 percent of sentences with transitive verbs.

The acquisition data for Mam and other Mayan languages have profound implications for language acquisition theory. Children demonstrate an early proficiency with verb inflection in languages with a rich morphology and where the language’s prosodic structure highlights the morphology. The Mam children’s use of directionals and extended ergative marking shows that two-year-olds are capable of using complex affixes appropriately in their obligatory contexts. This morphology accounts for the language-specific look of the children’s early utterances and guides its development in later stages.
