= San Juan Ostuncalco =

Ostuncalco San Juan Ostuncalco
- Municipality and town
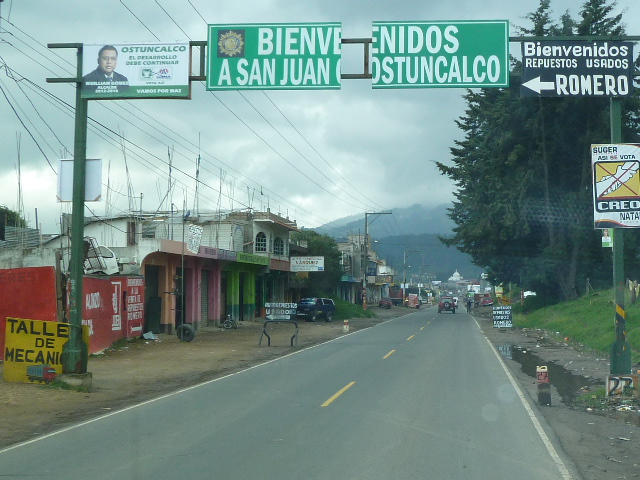
- Entering on Rt.1 from the N

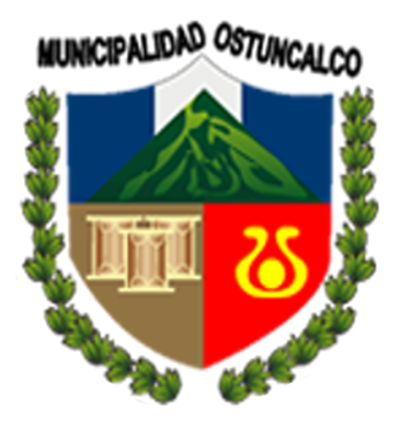
- Flag Seal

- Location within Guatemala
- Coordinates: 14°52′N 91°37′W
- Country: Guatemala
- Department: Quetzaltenango

Area
  - Total: 115 km^{2} (44 sq mi)
- Elevation: 2,502 m (8,209 ft)

Population (2018 census)
  - Total: 51,828
  - Density: 451/km^{2} (1,170/sq mi)
- Time zone: UTC+6 (Central Time)
- Climate: Cwb

San Juan Ostuncalco, is a town, with a population of 20,763 (2018 census), and a municipality in the Quetzaltenango department of Guatemala. Besides Spanish, local people speak the Mam language.

== Mercedarian doctrine ==
Mercedarian coat of arms.

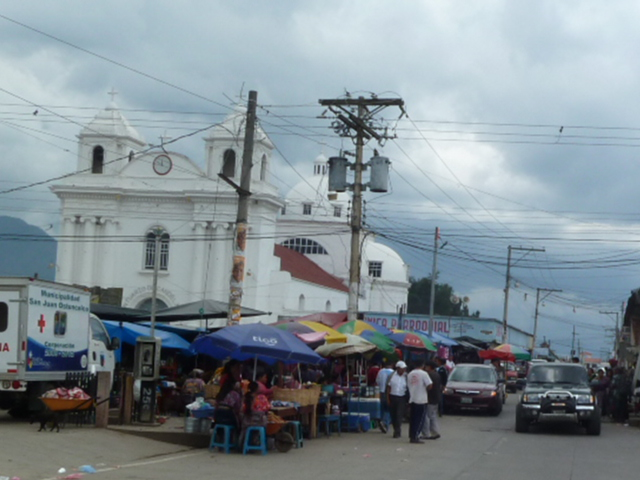
The colonial Catholic Church built by the Mercedarians in the central plaza.

After the Spanish conquest of Guatemala in the 1520s, the "Presentación de Guatemala" Mercedarian province was formed in 1565; originally, the order of the Blessed Virgin Mary of Mercy (the Mercedarians) had received from bishop Francisco Marroquín several doctrines in the Sacatepéquez and Chimaltenango valleys, close to the capital Santiago de los Caballeros de Guatemala, but they traded those with the Order of Preachers friars in exchange for the doctrines those had in the Sierra de los Cuchumatanes area. During the first part of the 17th century they also had doctrine in four towns close to the city of Santiago, which eventually became city neighborhoods: Espíritu Santo, Santiago, San Jerónimo and San Anton — which was the capital of the Mercedarians, where they had their convent and where their comendador lived.

According to bishop Juan de las Cabezas's memoir in 1613 and the bishop Pedro Cortés y Larraz parish visit minutes from 1770, the Mercedarians came to have nine doctrines, and numerous annexes, which were: Santa Ana de Malacatán, Concepción de Huehuetenango, San Pedro de Solomá, Nuestra Señora de la Purificación de Jacaltenango, Nuestra Señora de la Candelaria de Chiantla, San Andrés de Cuilco, Santiago de Tejutla, San Pedro de Sacatepéquez, and San Juan de Ostuncalco.

However, in 1754, due to the Bourbon reforms implemented by the Spanish kings, the Mercedarians - and the rest of the regular clergy for that matter - had to transfer their doctrines to the secular clergy, thus losing their San Juan Ostuncalco doctrine.

The 1765 Guatemala earthquake had its epicenter near Ostuncalco.

== Traditions ==
The "Baile del Torito" is a local dance from San Juan Ostuncalco.

== Climate ==
San Juan Ostuncalco municipal capital has a temperate, oceanic, monsoon-influenced climate, with dry winters and wet, cool summers (Köppen: Cwb).

Climate data for San Juan Ostuncalco
Month	Jan	Feb	Mar	Apr	May	Jun	Jul	Aug	Sep	Oct	Nov	Dec	Year
Mean daily maximum °C (°F)	17.0 (62.6)	17.6 (63.7)	19.2 (66.6)	20.3 (68.5)	19.8 (67.6)	19.0 (66.2)	18.8 (65.8)	19.2 (66.6)	18.6 (65.5)	17.9 (64.2)	18.0 (64.4)	17.3 (63.1)	18.6 (65.4)
Daily mean °C (°F)	9.5 (49.1)	10.1 (50.2)	11.6 (52.9)	13.3 (55.9)	14.2 (57.6)	14.2 (57.6)	13.9 (57.0)	13.6 (56.5)	13.7 (56.7)	12.9 (55.2)	11.7 (53.1)	10.5 (50.9)	12.4 (54.4)
Mean daily minimum °C (°F)	2.1 (35.8)	2.6 (36.7)	4.0 (39.2)	6.3 (43.3)	8.7 (47.7)	9.4 (48.9)	9.0 (48.2)	8.1 (46.6)	8.9 (48.0)	8.0 (46.4)	5.4 (41.7)	3.8 (38.8)	6.4 (43.4)
Average precipitation mm (inches)	4 (0.2)	5 (0.2)	14 (0.6)	48 (1.9)	180 (7.1)	243 (9.6)	184 (7.2)	194 (7.6)	265 (10.4)	165 (6.5)	22 (0.9)	7 (0.3)	1,331 (52.5)
Source: Climate-Data.org

== Geographic location ==
Ostuncalco municipality is surrounded by Quetzaltenango Department municipalities, except on the West, where it borders San Marcos Department:

== See also ==
- List of places in Guatemala

== Notes and references ==
=== Bibliography ===
- Cortés y Larraz, Pedro (1770). Descripción Geográfico-Moral de la Diócesis de Goathemala (in Spanish). Guatemala: Diócesis de Guatemala.
- Juarros, Domingo (1818). Compendio de la historia de la Ciudad de Guatemala (in Spanish). Guatemala: Ignacio Beteta.
- Pérez, Pedro Nolasco O. de M. (1966). Historia de las Misiones Mercedarias en América (in Spanish). Madrid.
