= Malacatán =

- Municipality
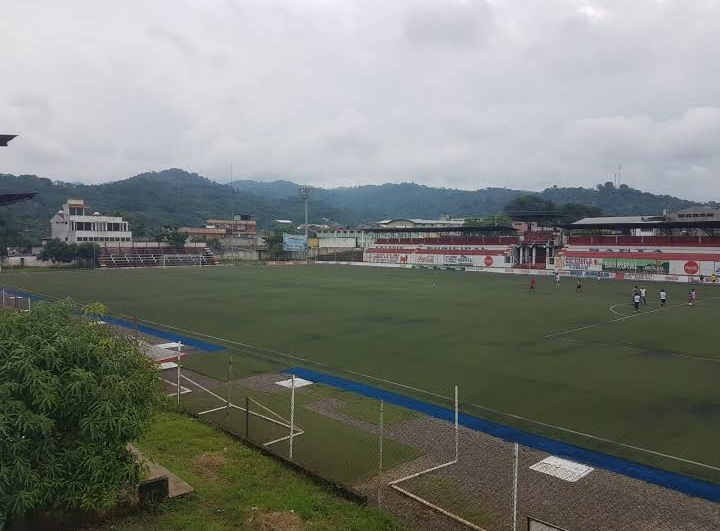

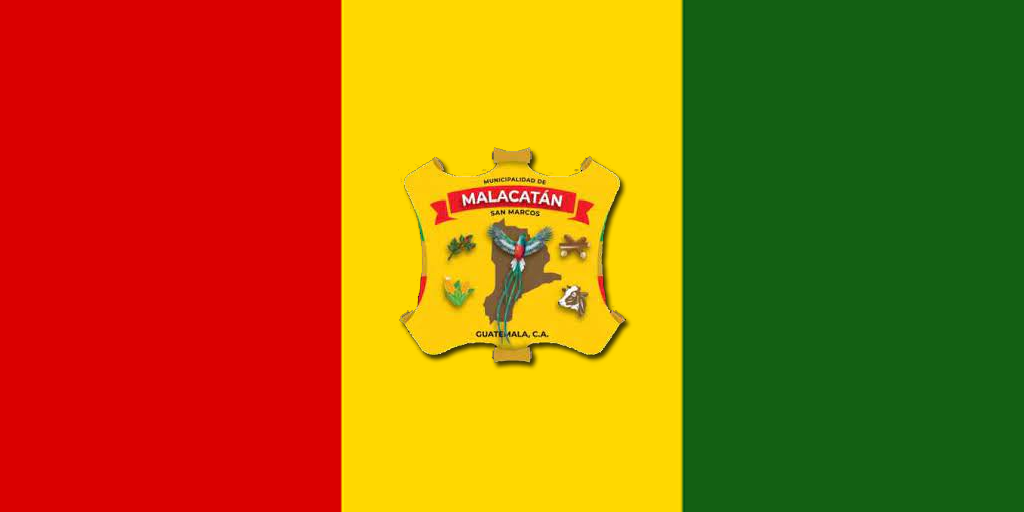
- Flag

- Location in Guatemala
- Coordinates: 14°54′0″N 92°2′59″W
- Country: Guatemala
- Department: San Marcos

Government
  - Mayor: Hipólito Hernández (Partido Patriota)

Area
  - Municipality: 89 sq mi (231 km^{2})

Population (2018)
  - Municipality: 92,816
  - Density: 1,040/sq mi (402/km^{2})
  - Urban: 8,689
- Climate: Am

Malacatán is a town and municipality in the San Marcos department of Guatemala, located to the west of San Marcos town. It is fairly close to the border with Mexico - the border-crossing point is in the nearby village of El Carmen.

== History ==
=== Spanish colony: Mercedarian doctrine ===
Mercedarian coat of arms.

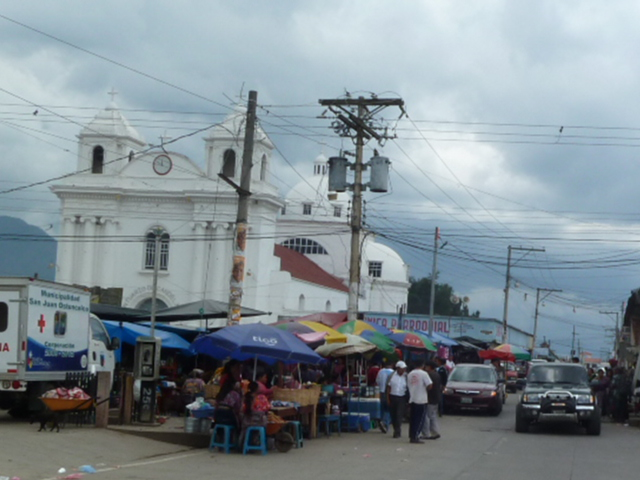
The colonial Catholic Church built by the Mercedarians in the central plaza.

After the Spanish conquest of Guatemala in the 1520s, the "Presentación de Guatemala" Mercedarian province was formed in 1565; originally, the order of the Blessed Virgin Mary of Mercy had gotten from bishop Francisco Marroquín several doctrines in the Sacatepéquez and Chimaltenango valleys, close to the capital Santiago de los Caballeros de Guatemala, but they traded those with the Order of Preachers friars in exchange for the doctrines those had in the Sierra de los Cuchumatanes area. During the first part of the 17th century they also had doctrine in four town close to the city of Santiago, which eventually became city neighborhoods: Espíritu Santo, Santiago, San Jerónimo and San Anton —which was the capital of the Mercedarians, where they had their convent and where their comendador lived.

According to bishop Juan de las Cabezas memoir in 1613 and the bishop Pedro Cortés y Larraz parish visit minutes from 1770, the Mercedarians came to have nine doctrines, and numerous annexes, which were: Santa Ana de Malacatán, Concepción de Huehuetenango, San Pedro de Solomá, Nuestra Señora de la Purificación de Jacaltenango, Nuestra Señora de la Candelaria de Chiantla, San Andrés de Cuilco, Santiago de Tejutla, San Pedro de Sacatepéquez, and San Juan de Ostuncalco.

However, in 1754, due to the borbon reforms implemented by the Spanish kings, the Mercedarins -and the rest of the regular clergy for that matter-, had to transfer their doctrines to the secular clergy, thus losing their San Juan Ostuncalco doctrine.

=== 21st century ===
Towards the end of the 20th century San Marcos became a hot spot for drug trafficking in Central America, and one of the top lords was Juan Chamalé Ortiz, who was heavily involved in cocaine trafficking, and was accused by US authorities of helping to move over 40 tons of cocaine through Central America en route to the United States. Ortiz worked with local fishermen to smuggle cocaine in small fishing boats and may have also commissioned semi-submersibles to transport the drug. Ortiz also controlled a major opium poppy producing area, the San Marcos Department, where he was a popular local figure. He owned at least ten estates in his area of operations, including a large farm in Malacatán and provided numerous jobs, in addition to cultivating local support by throwing parties and sponsoring beauty contests.

San Marcos is one of the most important regions in Guatemala given its proximity to the highlands, Mexico and to the Pacific Ocean coast, where most of the drugs coming from South America land. Ortiz exerted influence over local politicians and police in the region, and relied on a powerful local support network to conduct his business. He is thought to have worked out a deal that made him the Sinaloa Cartel's top transporter, helping the Mexican group move drugs that arrived via Pacific routes. Ortiz Chamalé was captured in 2011 in Quetzaltenango and extradited to the United States in 2014 where he was sentenced to 262 months in jail; when Ortiz was arrested in 2011, locals protested to demand his release.

== Sports ==
Deportivo Malacateco football club played the 2010/2011 season at the highest level of Guatemalan football, the Liga Mayor. They play their home games in the Estadio Santa Lucia.

== Climate ==
Malacatán has tropical climate (Köppen:Am), with a long rainy season from April to November, and a short dry season during the "winter". Although there is little variation in temperatures, April is normally the warmest month and October is normally the coolest month. The daytime afternoon temperatures are the warmers in February and March and coolest in September and October.

Climate data for Malacatán
Month	Jan	Feb	Mar	Apr	May	Jun	Jul	Aug	Sep	Oct	Nov	Dec	Year
Mean daily maximum °C (°F)	32.4 (90.3)	32.8 (91.0)	33.6 (92.5)	33.0 (91.4)	32.4 (90.3)	31.0 (87.8)	31.6 (88.9)	31.5 (88.7)	31.1 (88.0)	31.1 (88.0)	31.5 (88.7)	31.8 (89.2)	32.0 (89.6)
Daily mean °C (°F)	25.7 (78.3)	26.1 (79.0)	27.0 (80.6)	27.2 (81.0)	26.9 (80.4)	26.0 (78.8)	26.2 (79.2)	26.3 (79.3)	26.1 (79.0)	25.0 (77.0)	25.9 (78.6)	25.7 (78.3)	26.2 (79.1)
Mean daily minimum °C (°F)	19.1 (66.4)	19.4 (66.9)	20.4 (68.7)	21.4 (70.5)	21.5 (70.7)	21.0 (69.8)	20.9 (69.6)	21.1 (70.0)	21.2 (70.2)	21.0 (69.8)	20.3 (68.5)	19.6 (67.3)	20.6 (69.0)
Average precipitation mm (inches)	29 (1.1)	36 (1.4)	77 (3.0)	222 (8.7)	460 (18.1)	644 (25.4)	484 (19.1)	591 (23.3)	698 (27.5)	563 (22.2)	201 (7.9)	57 (2.2)	4,062 (159.9)
Source: Climate-Data.org

== Geographic location ==
It is surrounded by San Marcos Department municipalities, except on the West, where it borders Chiapas, a state of Mexico.

== Notes and references ==
=== Bibliography ===
- Comisión Guatemalteca de Límites con México (1900). Memoria sobre la cuestión de límites entre Guatemala y México (in Spanish). Guatemala: Tipografía Nacional. p. 325.
- Cortés y Larraz, Pedro (2001) [1770]. García, Jesús María; Blasco, Julio Martín (eds.). Descripción Geográfico-Moral de la Diócesis de Goathemala. Corpus Hispanorum de Pace. Segunda Serie (in Spanish). Consejo Superior de Investigaciones Científicas. ISBN 9788400080013. ISSN 0589-8056.
- Juarros, Domingo (1818). Compendio de la historia de la Ciudad de Guatemala (in Spanish). Guatemala: Ignacio Beteta.
- La Ilustración Guatemalteca (1896). "Nuestras fronteras". La Ilustración Guatemalteca (in Spanish). I (13). Guatemala: Síguere, Guirola y Cía.
- Pérez, Pedro Nolasco O. de M. (1966). Historia de las Misiones Mercedarias en América (in Spanish). Madrid.
