= San José Ojetenam =

- Municipality
- Nicknames: Cuna del paisaje (Spanish: Landscape cradle); Cuna de la Trucha (Spanish: Trout cradle)
- Motto: "Adios tristeza" (Spanish: Good-bye sadness)
- Location in Guatemala
- Coordinates: 15°13′0″N 91°58′0″W
- Country: Guatemala
- Department: San Marcos Department
- Founded: 23 August 1848
- Named municipality: 21 July 1945

Government
  - Type: Municipal democracy
  - Mayor: Magno Victorio Roblero (UNE)

Area
  - Total: 72 km^{2} (28 sq mi)
- Elevation: 3,050 m (10,010 ft)

Population (2010)
  - Total: 19,194
  - Density: 264/km^{2} (680/sq mi)
- Time zone: GMT -6
- Climate: Cwb

San José Ojetenam (San José: in honor to Saint Joseph, Ojetenam: from mam oje that means "ancient" and tenam that means "town") is a municipality in the San Marcos department of Guatemala.

== Description ==
San José Ojetenam is located deep in the mountainous highlands of Guatemala. It is located 2 hours by road from the nearest major town, San Marcos/San Pedro Sacatepéquez, and is between 8–10 hours from Guatemala City, which is 325 km (200 miles) to the east. As of 2008 the municipality had a population of 18,000 inhabitants, 3,930 of which lived in the town center. Politically, it is divided into 6 different micro-regions, which are composed of 68 different communities of varying size. The town centre is located at the altitude of 3,050 metres (10,000 feet) above sea level, which makes the average temperature 16 °C (61 °F), quite cold for tropical standards. However, due to extreme variety of elevations within the municipality there are some very temperate communities in lower elevations, and very frigid communities at higher elevations. In January 2008, for the first time in recent history, snow fell on the Cotzic pass, which is the highest point in the entire municipality (3,700 metres/12,000 ft. above sea level)

During the rainy season (mid-May to mid-November) the town is regularly subjected to white-out conditions and constant drizzle because of cloud accumulation. Despite the inclement weather, the town offers many great vistas and hiking opportunities, especially during the dry season. San José is perched above several river valleys, as the Coatan and Cuilco rivers both have major tributaries born in San José. And on a clear day it is possible to view as far as Volcano Agua to the east, the Cumbre plateau in Huehuetenango to the northeast, and the Mexican/Guatemalan Coast and Tapachula to the southwest. The two tallest points in Central America, Volcano Tajumulco and Volcano Tacaná are also both very close and are regularly visible from San José. Additionally, San José is the home of "El Prado", a trout hatchery, which is a short walk away from the town centre. El Prado has a hotel, a conference center, a playground, and visitors can fish in the pond and take small pedal boats onto the water as well.

In regards to the population, there is a pocket of Ladino (people who belong to the Hispanic culture, and speak Spanish) Guatemalans who live in the town center, and there are a few communities on the fringe of the municipality that speak in Mam, a Mayan language, and dress in traditional indigenous clothing, but the majority of the inhabitants of San José fall into a gray area. Ethnically, they fall into the indigenous category, as their ancestors were indigenous. However, culturally and legally, they self-identify as Ladinos, as this is a social advantage in society. The change of identity originated in the Guatemalan Civil War, when indigenous peoples in the highlands were military targets. Many indigenous people, in San José as well as other places, started dressing more like Ladinos and started speaking solely in Spanish to avoid scrutiny from the army. This change became permanent in San José, and today the only language spoken is Spanish, with the exception of the very few outlying communities who still speak Mam.

== Economy ==
Ojetecos, as San José residents are known, are mostly subsistence farmers. Their main agricultural products include potatoes, wheat, oats, beans, maize, squash, avocados, peaches, and apples to name a few. These crops are also traded and sold during bi-weekly market days. The majority of income however, does not come from the agricultural sector, but rather from remittances. Most San José families have one or more member working illegally in the United States, sending back money weekly or monthly. The poorest families, those that cannot afford to pay for passage to the United States, usually send a male representative across the border to Chiapas, Mexico once a year, where they can find work picking coffee. These family members also remit their money, making the economy of San José wholly dependent on remittances.

== History ==
The municipality was settled by a group of people on 23 August 1848 as "San José", where in the 21st century there is a small settlement, by an initiative of Ángel Roblero. (Note: The municipality founding fathers were: Ángel Roblero, Brígido Roblero, José Roblero, Marcos Gómez, Leonidas Escobar, Antonio de León, Luis Barrios, Carlos de León, Francisco de León, Benigno Roblero, Narciso Roblero, Domingo Roblero and Ursulo Romero.)

After severe landslides forced the inhabitants to move to a different location, they chose a place called «Ixjoyon» (mam language meaning «land prosperous for potato»), where the main settlement has remained since. During the 1871 revolution, general Justo Rufino Barrios conferenced with his troops prior to invade Tacaná in a hill that surrounds this area, which has been called "Cerro Barrios" ("Barrios hill") since.

In 1935, during general Jorge Ubico's regime, the municipality was dissolved and the settlements was annexed to Ixchiguán. However, this change was short-lived, as once Ubico was overthrown in 1945, new president el doctor Juan José Arévalo, On 21 June 1945 designated it as a municipality once again.

A variety of non-governmental organizations operate in San Jose to assist its people in agricultural projects, forestry projects, small business development, childhood education, and municipal development. Examples of these organizations include: The United States Peace Corps, Intervida, CARE International, and Creciendo Bien. During 2003, the Cuban government deployed two nurses to assist the Guatemalan doctor and two Guatemalan nurses already staffing the municipal clinic. In July 2005, the medical resources of that clinic were overwhelmed when an overloaded bus on the way to market veered off the road and tumbled 200 metres down the hillside. The bus was carrying more than 90 people. More than 30 people died in the accident. 50 more were injured. San Jose's ambulance was not working at the time because it had broken down after being repeatedly used to transport the town's soccer team to and from regional games.

== Climate ==
San José Ojetenam has temperate climate (Köppen: Cwb).

Climate data for San José Ojetenam
Month	Jan	Feb	Mar	Apr	May	Jun	Jul	Aug	Sep	Oct	Nov	Dec	Year
Mean daily maximum °C (°F)	14.8 (58.6)	14.9 (58.8)	16.5 (61.7)	16.8 (62.2)	16.0 (60.8)	15.1 (59.2)	15.0 (59.0)	15.3 (59.5)	14.9 (58.8)	14.4 (57.9)	14.9 (58.8)	15.1 (59.2)	15.3 (59.5)
Daily mean °C (°F)	7.7 (45.9)	7.7 (45.9)	9.2 (48.6)	9.9 (49.8)	10.5 (50.9)	10.4 (50.7)	10.3 (50.5)	10.0 (50.0)	10.3 (50.5)	9.6 (49.3)	9.0 (48.2)	8.7 (47.7)	9.4 (49.0)
Mean daily minimum °C (°F)	0.7 (33.3)	0.6 (33.1)	1.9 (35.4)	3.1 (37.6)	5.0 (41.0)	5.8 (42.4)	5.6 (42.1)	4.8 (40.6)	5.7 (42.3)	4.9 (40.8)	3.1 (37.6)	2.3 (36.1)	3.6 (38.5)
Average precipitation mm (inches)	14 (0.6)	11 (0.4)	26 (1.0)	70 (2.8)	180 (7.1)	274 (10.8)	197 (7.8)	227 (8.9)	291 (11.5)	183 (7.2)	41 (1.6)	18 (0.7)	1,532 (60.4)
Source: Climate-Data.org

== Geographic location ==
San José Ojetenam is 60 km away from San Marcos, the capital of the Department of San Marcos.

== See also ==
- San Marcos
