= San Pedro Sacatepéquez =

San Pedro Sacatepéquez is the name of two locations in Guatemala:

- In Guatemala department:
  - San Pedro Sacatepéquez, Guatemala
- In San Marcos department:
  - San Pedro Sacatepéquez, San Marcos
