= Tejutla, San Marcos =

Tejutla
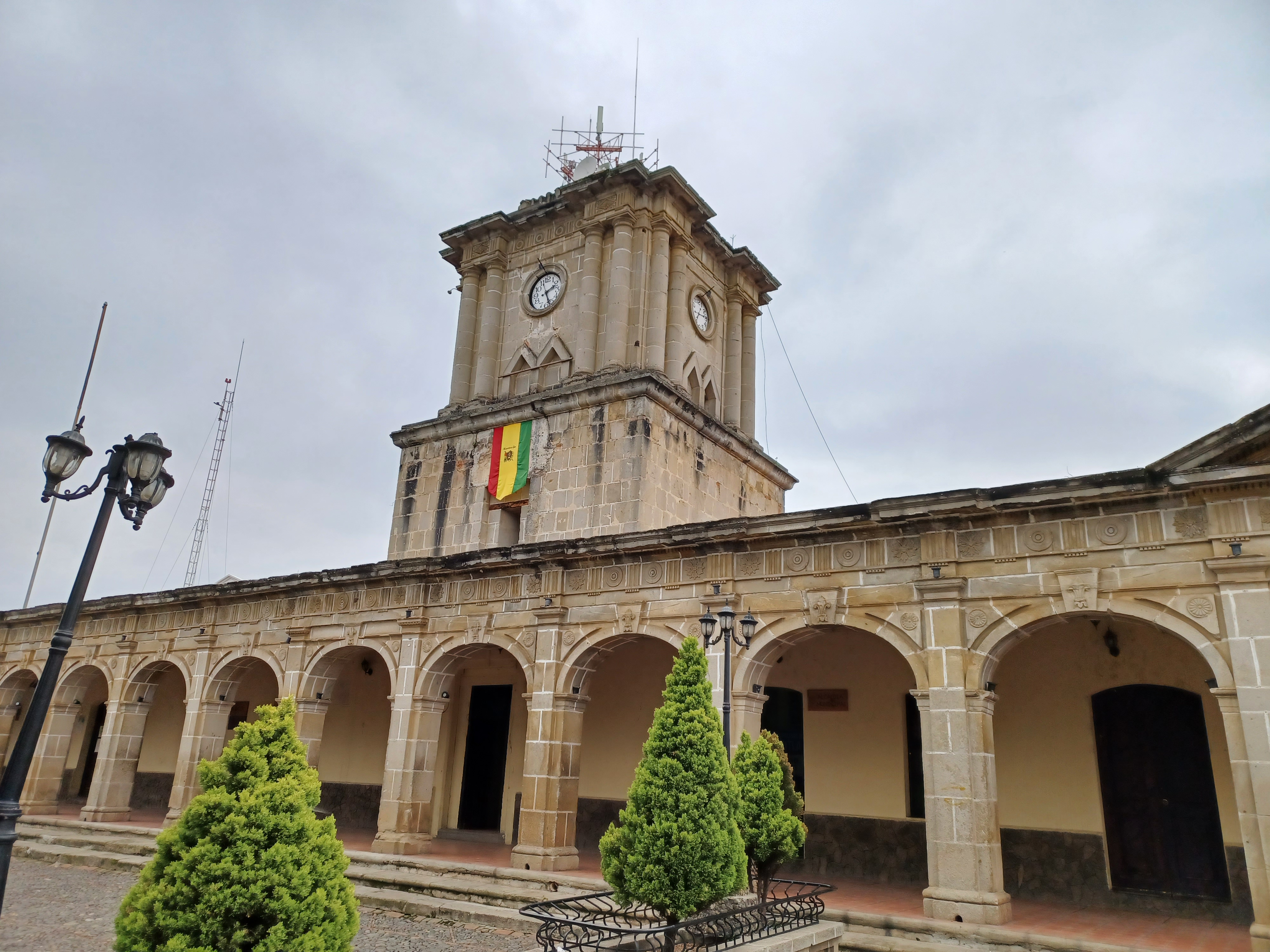
- Tejutla Municipal Palace

- Location in San Marcos Department, Guatemala Tejutla (Guatemala)
- Coordinates: 15°07′N 91°48′W
- Country: Guatemala
- Department: San Marcos
- Founded: July 25, 1672

Government
  - Mayor of Tejutla: Humberto Gómez

Area
  - Total: 142 km^{2} (55 sq mi)
- Elevation: 2,500 m (8,200 ft)

Population (2004)
  - Total: 24,242
- Time zone: GMT -6
- Climate: Cwb

Tejutla (Spanish pronunciation: [teˈxutla]) is a municipality in the western highlands of Guatemala, in the department of San Marcos. Tejutla was officially founded on 25 July 1672, although it was already an important town within the Mam kingdom in 1524, at the time of the Spanish conquest of Guatemala. It is situated high in the mountains, the so-called "cold zone", at about 2500 m altitude.

Tejutla is primarily a Ladino municipality in that the majority of its inhabitants speak Spanish and are not indigenous. Tejutla has about 31,139 inhabitants, with about 6,000 living within the urban center (casco urbano). The municipio of Tejutla includes 67 communities, 20 of which are Aldeas and the rest are Caserios, Cantones and Colonias. The rivers Xolobaj and Del Molino flow through the town of Tejutla. The general climate in Tejutla during the winter, which runs from November through February, is about 10 degrees Celsius but temperatures can drop up to 5 degrees lower. Temperatures during the months of May through November can range anywhere from 18 to 30 degrees Celsius. The economy in Tejutla lives on agriculture, mainly apples and potatoes, although carrots, onions, cauliflower, broccoli, cabbage, beans, lettuce, tomatoes, and peaches are also grown locally within the municipality.

== History ==
=== Spanish Colony ===
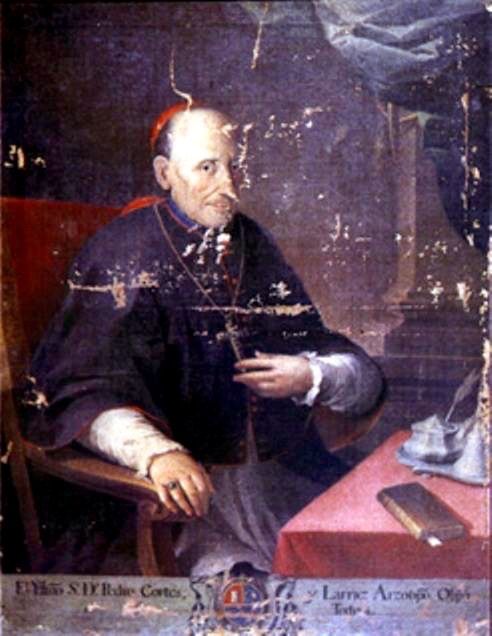
Bishop Pedro Cortés y Larraz portrait; he arrived to Tejutla in 1770.

The name Tejutla is of uncertain origin, being variously attributed to the local Mam language, derived from twui c'ukal meaning "upon the hill of white sand", or from the Nahuatl language of Tlaxcala in Mexico, meaning "walled land" or "land of the dyers", or from the Chorti language in which it means "land of embers".

The "Villa de Tejutla', town's official name, is an old settlement that already existed when the Spaniards arrived to the region in 1524; it was an important commercial town for the Mam people due to the weaving that was done there. However, its foundation as a colonial town was not official until 25 July 1627, when the encomenderos founded a Spanish town called Santiato Tenango next to the Indian town. each town had its own authorities and their own business leaders. Eventually, both towns merged and decided to call the resulting settlement "Santiago Tejutla" to remember the old names; Tenango was on the north side, and Tejutla on the South.

In 1690, Tejutla had a large area and included the modern municipalities of Comitancillo, Ixchiguán, Concepción Tutuapa, Sipacapa, Sibinal, Tajumulco, Tacaná and part of what is now San Miguel Ixtahuacán. According to the historical writings from Recordación Florida of Francisco Antonio de Fuentes y Guzmán, Tejutla belonged to Quetzaltenango Department and it was a "prosperous land with rich weathers and comfortable forest with enough water".

Tejutla was an important commercial and religious center; in August 1767, Joseph Domingo Hidalgo described Santiago Tejutla as "El Curato" -i.e., the focal center of commerce of all the towns that were around it− in the Gaceta de Guatemala, the official newspaper of the times. Then, in the last quarter of the 18th century, bishop Dr. Pedro Cortés y Larraz, who arrived from Cuilco in 1770 as part of the inspection he was doing of the Guatemalan dioceses, called Tejutla "Santiago en la Cima del Monte" (English: Santiago at the top of the hill" and reported that there were "sixty four families who lived very well" in the area.

In 1754 the Mercedarians gave away their convent to the secular clergy per the Borbonic reforms that were instituted by the King of Spain, and Tejutla became a secular "curato".

=== After the independence from Spain ===
The Central American United Provinces constitution from 11 October 1821, showed Tejutla under modern San Marcos jurisdiction for the very first time.

In 1870 Tejutla reached "Villa" category and, due to its development, its authorities requested to the House of Representatives of Guatemala to be named a Department capital. The department was going to have the municipalities mentioned above, along with the modern municipalities of Cuilco, Santa Bárbara and San Gaspar, Huehuetenango, from the modern Huehuetenango Department. Besides, in those days, Motocintla, Cacahuatán and Tapachula—which would go definitively to Mexico in 1892 due to the Herrera-Mariscal treaty— were under the jurisdiction of the Mercedarian convent located in Tejutla. Furthermore, Tejutla even had House representatives of its own in those days.

But power shifted when the conservatives led by Field Marshal Vicente Cerna were defeated by the liberal forces of generals Miguel Garcia Granados and Justo Rufino Barrios −who was a San Lorenzo native; once the liberals were in power, they expelled the regular clergy from Guatemala and abolished mandatory tithing for the secular clergy, thus leaving Tejutla without their main administrative and leadership support, the curato. In fact, Barrios government confiscated monasteries, large extensions of farm land, sugar mills and Indian doctrines from the regular orders and then distributed it to his liberal friend and comrades, who became large landowners in the area.

=== 20th century ===
This remote area was hit by the civil war in the early 1980s, when innocent citizens were terrorized by G-2 forces, the former secret police of Guatemala during the government of general Fernando Romeo Lucas García.

=== 21st century ===
In 2005, Tejutla suffered under the devastation of hurricane Stan.

== Communities ==
Tejutla is divided in one town and several villages (Spanish: "Aldeas"), settlements (Spanish: "Caseríos"), rural settlements (Spanish: "Cantones") and neighborhoods (Spanish: "Colonias").

Tejutla communities
Community	Names
Town	Casco Urbano Tejutla (Municipal capital)
Villages	Agua Tibia, Armenia, Buena Vista El Rosario, Cancela, Cancela Grande, Los Cerezos, Chalanchac, Culvillá, Cuyá, Las Delicias, La Democracia, Esquipulas, El Horizonte, Ixmulcá, El Paraíso, Quipambe, San Isidro, Tojuchoc, Tuicincé, Venecia
Settlements	Los Arcos La Pradrera, El Bosque, California, Campachan, Central Progreso, Cerro El Tumbador, Chacojóm, Chápil, El Chorro Veinte Palos, Cólven, Cristalinas, El Edén, La Esmeralda, Estancia de la Virgen, La Florida, Fraternidad, Los Frutales, Hermón, La Independencia, Inmortal Libertad, Júlen, Los Laureles, Linda Vista, Loma Linda, El Manantial, El Mirador, Los Molinos, Nueva Ermita, Nueva Esperanza, Nueva Jerusalem, Peña Flor, El Progreso, Los Ramírez, La Reforma, Las Rosas, Las Tapias, La Unión, Villa Flores, Vista Hermosa El Pinal
Rural settlements	Las Hortalizas, Aldea Las Delicias; La Joya de Tejas, Caserío Central Progreso; La Joya, Caserío La Union; Cantón Progreso, Aldea Las Delicias; Valle Verde, Aldea Esquipulas
Neighborhoods	Diez de Mayo, Las Manzanillas I, Las Manzanillas II, Sacabelén, Tuiscol, Villa Nueva

== Tourism ==
Although Tejutla is settled in a spectacular landscape, tourism is still very limited in this region. Every July, the city celebrates its town festival, dedicated to Santiago Apóstol, St. James. There is a cultural centre "casa de la cultura" in the city.

== Climate ==
Tejutla has temperate climate (Köppen: Cwb).

Climate data for Tejutla
Month	Jan	Feb	Mar	Apr	May	Jun	Jul	Aug	Sep	Oct	Nov	Dec	Year
Mean daily maximum °C (°F)	18.8 (65.8)	19.2 (66.6)	20.8 (69.4)	21.3 (70.3)	20.7 (69.3)	19.8 (67.6)	19.8 (67.6)	20.3 (68.5)	19.7 (67.5)	19.3 (66.7)	19.2 (66.6)	19.0 (66.2)	19.8 (67.7)
Daily mean °C (°F)	11.4 (52.5)	11.6 (52.9)	13.1 (55.6)	14.2 (57.6)	14.8 (58.6)	14.7 (58.5)	14.6 (58.3)	14.5 (58.1)	14.6 (58.3)	14.1 (57.4)	12.8 (55.0)	12.2 (54.0)	13.6 (56.4)
Mean daily minimum °C (°F)	4.0 (39.2)	4.1 (39.4)	5.5 (41.9)	7.1 (44.8)	9.0 (48.2)	9.7 (49.5)	9.5 (49.1)	8.8 (47.8)	9.5 (49.1)	8.9 (48.0)	6.5 (43.7)	5.4 (41.7)	7.3 (45.2)
Average precipitation mm (inches)	4 (0.2)	5 (0.2)	21 (0.8)	58 (2.3)	158 (6.2)	216 (8.5)	175 (6.9)	201 (7.9)	216 (8.5)	154 (6.1)	22 (0.9)	11 (0.4)	1,241 (48.9)
Source: Climate-Data.org; Instituto Nacional de Sismología, Vulcanología, Meteorología e Hidrología de Guatemala

== Geographic location ==
Tejutla is surrounded by San Marcos Department municipalities:

== See also ==
- Tapachula International Airport
- La Aurora International Airport

== Notes and references ==
=== Bibliography ===
- Cortés y Larraz, Pedro (1770). Descripción Geográfico-Moral de la Diócesis de Goathemala (in Spanish). Guatemala: Diócesis de Guatemala.
- Fuentes y Guzmán, Francisco Antonio de (1932) [1690]. Recordación Florida. Discurso historial y demostración natural, material, militar y política del Reyno de Guatemala. Biblioteca Goathemala de la Sociedad de Geografía e Historia Volumen VI (in Spanish). Vol. I–III. Guatemala: Tipografía Nacional.
- Pérez, Pedro Nolasco O. de M. (1966). Historia de las Misiones Mercedarias en América (in Spanish). Madrid.
