= San Ildefonso Ixtahuacán =

- Municipality
- Location in Guatemala
- Coordinates: 15°25′00″N 91°46′00″W
- Country: Guatemala
- Department: Huehuetenango

Area
  - Municipality: 135 km^{2} (52 sq mi)

Population (2018 census)
  - Municipality: 44,424
  - Density: 329/km^{2} (852/sq mi)
  - Urban: 10,875
- Climate: Cwb

San Ildefonso Ixtahuacán is a municipality in the Guatemalan department of Huehuetenango, situated at 1580 metres above sea level, with the town of Ixtahuacán as the municipal seat. The municipality has a population of 44,424 (2018 census) and covers an area of 135 km^{2} (52 sq mi). The annual festival is January 20–25.
