= San Miguel Sigüilá =

Municipality in Guatemala

Coordinates: 14°54′N 91°37′W

San Miguel Sigüilá (Spanish pronunciation: [ˈsam miˈɣel siɣwiˈla]) is a municipality in the Quetzaltenango department of Guatemala.
