= San Marcos, Guatemala =

San Marcos
- Municipality
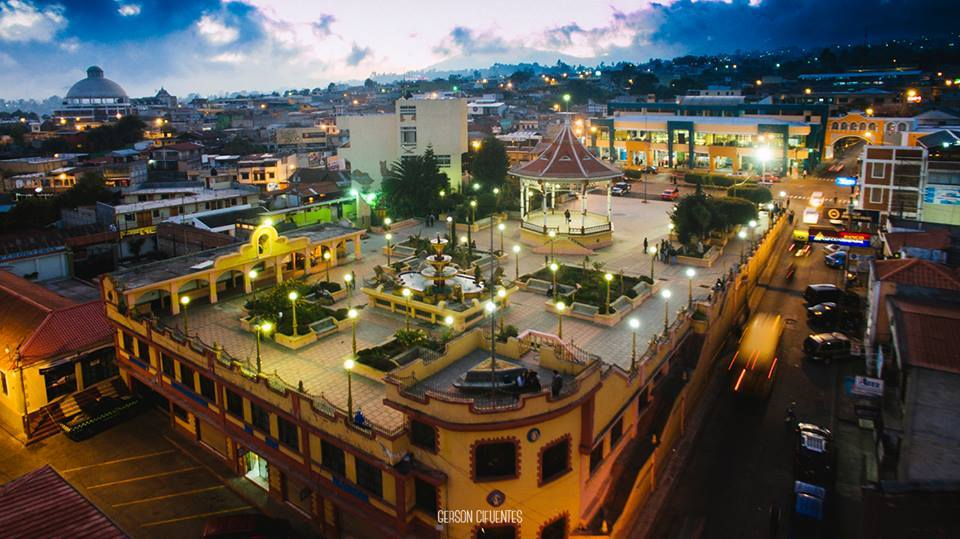
- Panoramic

- Flag
- Nickname: Marquesa de La Ensenada
- Location in Guatemala
- Coordinates: 14°57′55″N 91°47′45″W
- Country: Guatemala
- Department: San Marcos

Area
  - Municipality: 119 km^{2} (46 sq mi)
- Elevation: 2,398 m (7,867 ft)

Population (2018 census)
  - Municipality: 47,063
  - Density: 395/km^{2} (1,020/sq mi)
  - Urban: 47,063
- Climate: Cwb

San Marcos is a city and municipality in Guatemala. It is the capital of the department of San Marcos. The municipality has a population of 47,063 (2018 census).

== History ==
=== 1897 Quetzaltenango Revolt ===
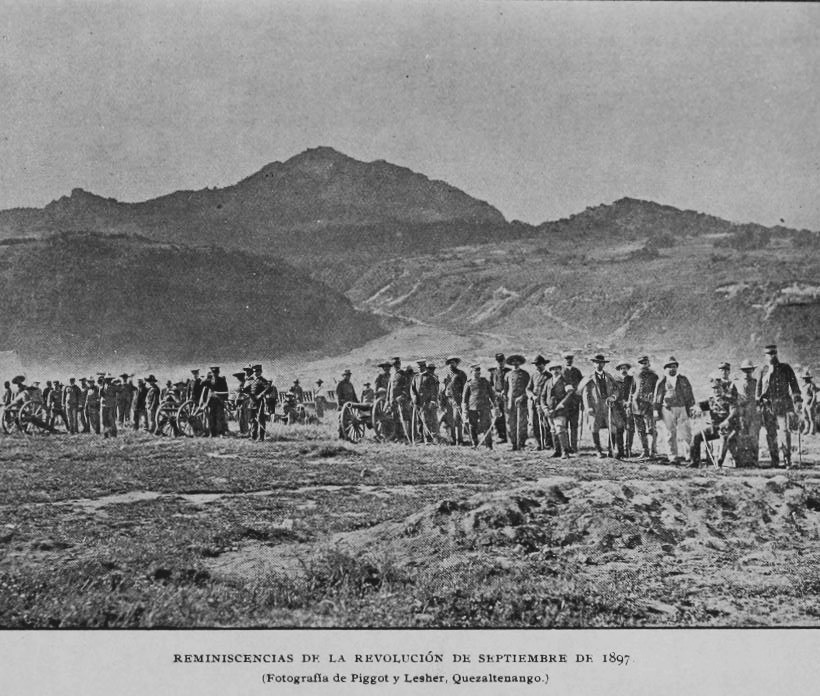
General García León brigade on the Totonicapan fields. Army forces loyal to president Reina Barrios

In September 1897, after the failure of both the interoceanic railroad and the Central American Expo and the deep economic crisis that Guatemala was facing after the plummeting international prices of both coffee and silver, the people of Quetzaltenango raised in arms against the decision of president José María Reina Barrios to extend his presidential term until 1902. (Note: Back then, the Panama Canal had not been built yet and Reina Barrios had high hopes on getting international investors interested in the interoceanic railroad, which was the main event for the Central American Expo; unfortunately, due to the economic crisis, and bad budgeting, the government could not complete the railroad and after the failure of the Expo, it had to take drastic austerity measures, that included closing schools.) A group of rebels, among them a former Secretary of Reina Barrios's cabinet -Próspero Morales-, began to combat on 7 September 1897 attacking San Marcos; after several battles and some gains in Ocos, Coatepeque and Colomba the rebels were defeated on 4 October 1897. As a result, on 23 October 1897, San Pedro Sacatepéquez became the capital of San Marcos Department.

=== 20th century ===
In 1903 the eruption of the Santa María volcano in the neighboring department of Quetzaltenango was responsible for the destruction of the twin towns of San Marcos and San Pedro Sacatepéquez. The towns were rebuilt and on 16 December 1935, during the presidency of general Jorge Ubico, it was annexed to San Pedro Sacatepéquez forming the municipality of La Unión San Marcos. However, this system did not work and La Unión San Marcos was broken apart on 20 July 1945, but San Pedro Sacatepéquez lost the capital of San Marcos Department to the municipality of San Marcos.

=== 21st century ===
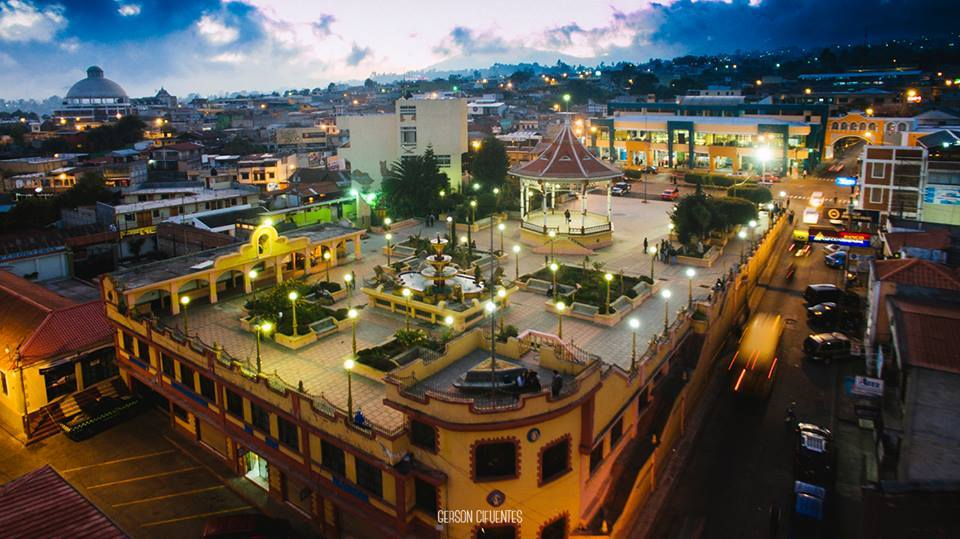
Ciudad San Marcos

Towards the end of the 20th century San Marcos became a hot spot for drug trafficking in Central America, and one of the top lords was Juan Chamalé Ortiz, who was heavily involved in cocaine trafficking, and was accused by US authorities of helping to move over 40 tons of cocaine through Central America en route to the United States. Ortiz worked with local fishermen to smuggle cocaine in small fishing boats and may have also commissioned semi-submersibles to transport the drug. Ortiz also controlled a major opium poppy producing area, the San Marcos Department, where he was a popular local figure. He owned at least ten estates in his area of operations, centered in San Marcos city, and provided numerous jobs, in addition to cultivating local support by throwing parties and sponsoring beauty contests.

San Marcos is one of the most important regions in Guatemala given its proximity to the highlands, Mexico and to the Pacific Ocean coast, where most of the drugs coming from South America land. Ortiz exerted influence over local politicians and police in the region, and relied on a powerful local support network to conduct his business. He is thought to have worked out a deal that made him the Sinaloa Cartel's top transporter, helping the Mexican group move drugs that arrived via Pacific routes. Ortiz Chamalé was captured in 2011 in Quetzaltenango and extradited to the United States in 2014 where he was sentenced to 262 months in jail; when Ortiz was arrested in 2011, locals protested to demand his release.

== Sports ==
The city is home of the football club Deportivo Marquense who play in Guatemala's Premier League in the Estadio Marquesa de la Ensenada.

== Gallery ==
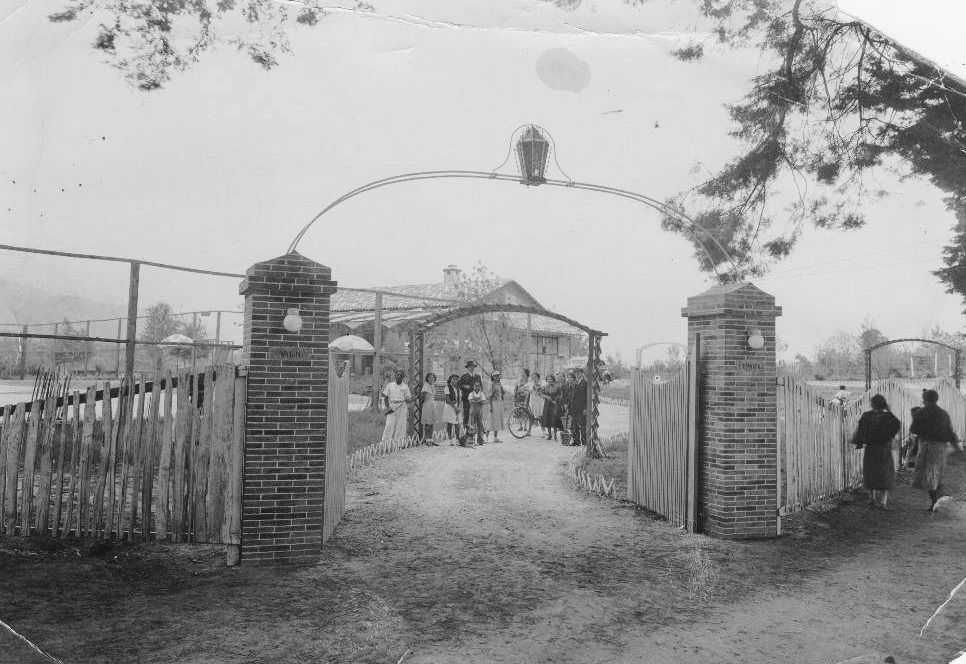
1940s

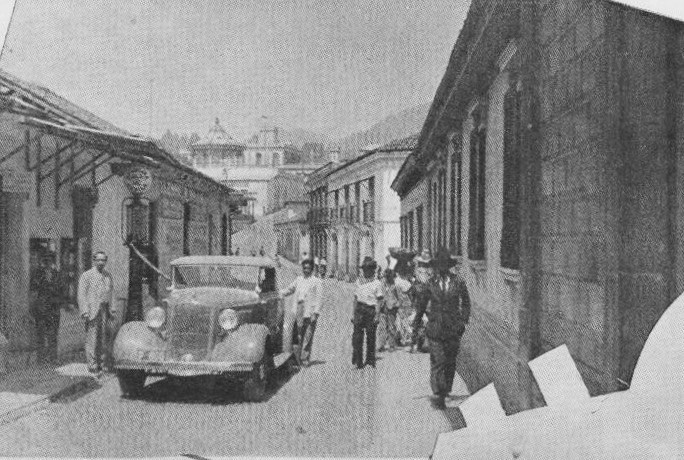
1940s

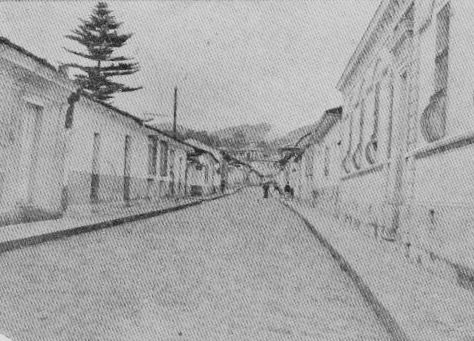
1940s

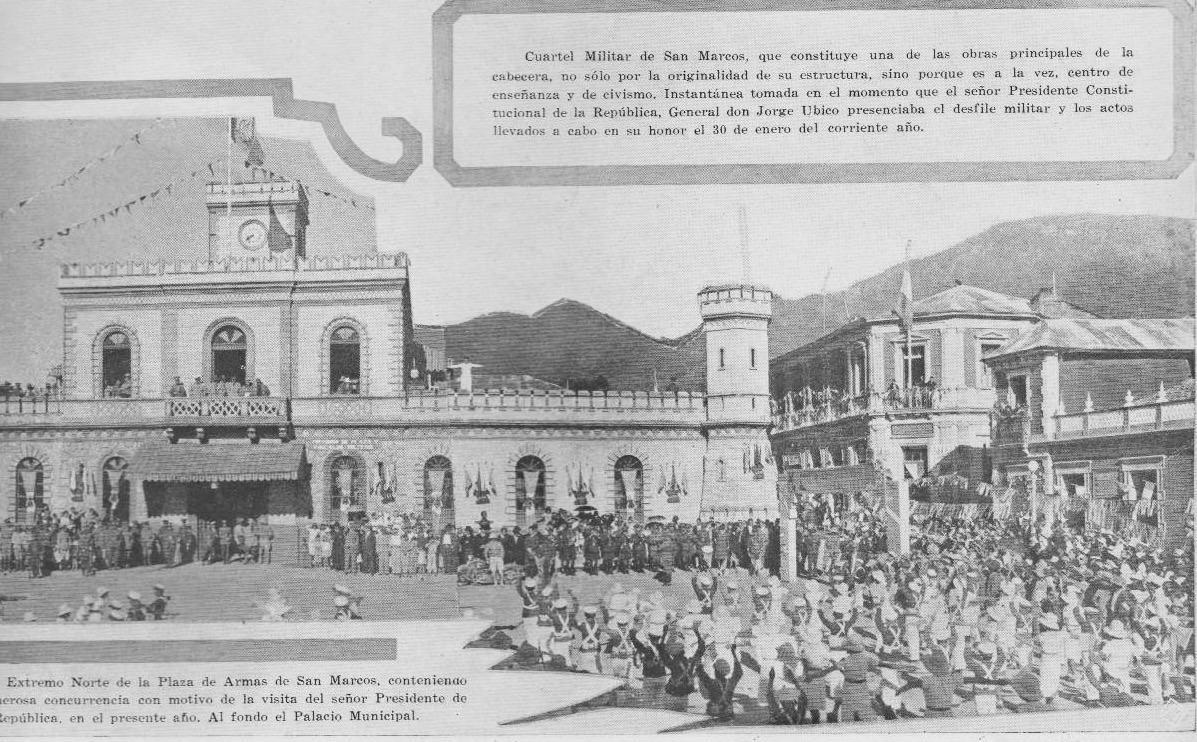
President general Jorge Ubico visit in 1940.

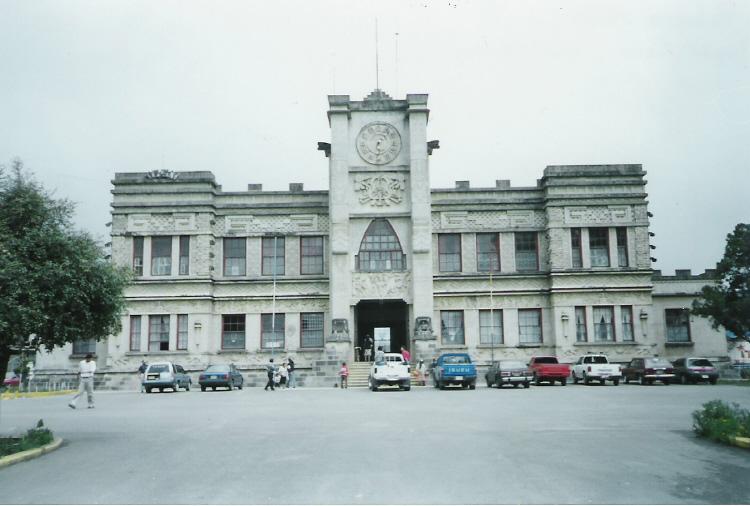
Mayan Palace

== Climate ==
San Marcos has a subtropical highland climate (climate type Cwb), according to the Köppen climate classification. The weather is pleasant to warm, though with cool to cold mornings, throughout the year. There are two seasons: the dry season from November to April and the wet season from May to October, which produces almost all the annual rainfall of about 1,377 millimetres or 54 inches.

Climate data for San Marcos, Guatemala (1990–2003)
Month	Jan	Feb	Mar	Apr	May	Jun	Jul	Aug	Sep	Oct	Nov	Dec	Year
Record high °C (°F)	25.0 (77.0)	26.5 (79.7)	25.5 (77.9)	26.5 (79.7)	26.7 (80.1)	26.0 (78.8)	25.2 (77.4)	23.5 (74.3)	23.0 (73.4)	23.5 (74.3)	24.0 (75.2)	24.0 (75.2)	26.7 (80.1)
Mean daily maximum °C (°F)	20.2 (68.4)	20.2 (68.4)	20.9 (69.6)	21.2 (70.2)	20.7 (69.3)	20.0 (68.0)	20.6 (69.1)	20.6 (69.1)	19.8 (67.6)	19.8 (67.6)	20.1 (68.2)	20.3 (68.5)	20.4 (68.7)
Daily mean °C (°F)	11.4 (52.5)	11.4 (52.5)	12.1 (53.8)	13.7 (56.7)	14.5 (58.1)	14.2 (57.6)	14.3 (57.7)	14.3 (57.7)	13.9 (57.0)	13.3 (55.9)	12.6 (54.7)	12.0 (53.6)	13.1 (55.7)
Mean daily minimum °C (°F)	2.6 (36.7)	2.7 (36.9)	3.3 (37.9)	6.2 (43.2)	8.2 (46.8)	8.4 (47.1)	7.9 (46.2)	8.0 (46.4)	8.0 (46.4)	6.9 (44.4)	5.1 (41.2)	3.8 (38.8)	5.9 (42.7)
Record low °C (°F)	−6.5 (20.3)	−4.0 (24.8)	−5.0 (23.0)	−0.5 (31.1)	0.5 (32.9)	4.0 (39.2)	2.0 (35.6)	3.0 (37.4)	0.0 (32.0)	0.0 (32.0)	−2.5 (27.5)	−4.0 (24.8)	−6.5 (20.3)
Average rainfall mm (inches)	4.3 (0.17)	4.4 (0.17)	15.5 (0.61)	66.9 (2.63)	180.4 (7.10)	289.2 (11.39)	157.9 (6.22)	208.4 (8.20)	287.2 (11.31)	110.4 (4.35)	30.4 (1.20)	21.7 (0.85)	1,376.6 (54.20)
Average rainy days	0.8	0.8	2.1	7.3	12.8	20.3	13.6	16.1	20.8	12.1	3.8	3.1	113.5
Average relative humidity (%)	80.1	81.0	83.4	87.0	90.0	88.7	86.6	87.3	90.6	89.0	85.7	82.0	86.0
Source: INSIVUMEH (humidity 1990–1996)

== Geographic location ==
San Marcos is completely surrounded by municipalities of San Marcos Department:

== See also ==
- Justo Rufino Barrios
- San Marcos Department
