= Pedro Cortés y Larraz =

Spanish bishop

The Most Reverend Pedro Cortés y Larraz
- Archbishop of Guatemala
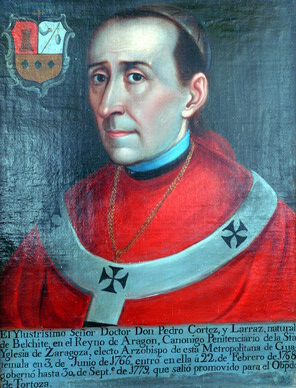
- Official portrait
- Province: Guatemala
- Diocese: Santiago de los Caballeros de Guatemala
- See: Guatemala City
- Installed: 1767
- Term ended: 1779
- Predecessor: Francisco José de Figueredo y Victoria
- Successor: Cayetano Francos y Monroy
- Other post: Bishop of Tortosa (1780–1786)

Orders
- Consecration: 1767

Personal details
- Born: 6 July 1712 Belchite, Spain
- Died: 7 July 1787 (aged 75) Zaragoza, Spain
- Denomination: Catholic

Pedro Cortés y Larraz (Belchite, Zaragoza, 6 July 1712 - Zaragoza, 7 July 1787) was Archbishop of Guatemala between 1767 and 1779 and bishop of Tortosa between 1780 and 1786.

== Biography ==
=== Early life ===
Graduated with a doctorate in Spain when he was twenty-nine years old, and later was ordained as priest. Moved to the Spain possessions in America was consecrated bishop by Francisco Fabián Fuero in Puebla de los Ángeles.

=== Archbishop of Guatemala ===
Upon taking over the archdiocese of Guatemala, began preparing to travel all across his new dominion; he sent letter to all the secular priests ahead of time so they were ready to have a report for him upon his arrival. From this trip, which lasted from November 1768 to August 1770, he wrote Descripción Geográfico-Moral de la Diócesis de Goathemala (Moral and geographic description of the Diocese of Guatemala). By 1769, Cortés y Larraz was so disappointed with the ecclesiastical situation of his new diocese that were presented his resignation, but king Carlos III did not accept it and he had to continue as archbishop. Among the problems that he could see were the excessive alcoholism of the people during the liturgical ceremonies and the poor preparation the secular clergy had in most of the parishes -the latter, a result of the regular clergy returning all of their doctrines in 1754 following a king's order and borbon reforms.

Strong willed and defender of the doctrine orthodoxy was in constant conflict with the Spanish authorities and the clergy itself.

=== Santa Marta earthquake ===
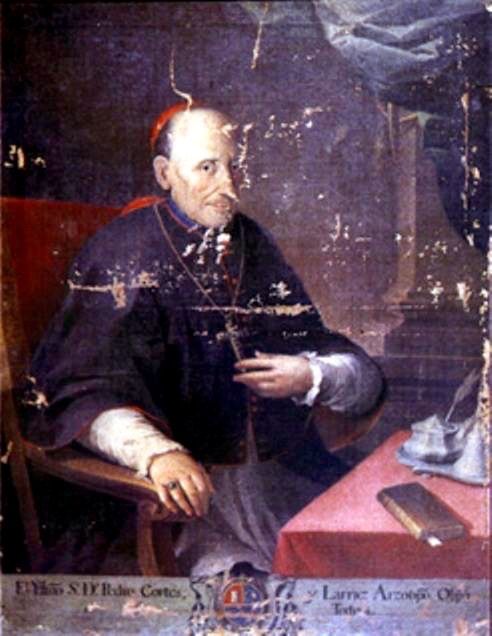
Bishop Cortés y Larraz portrait.

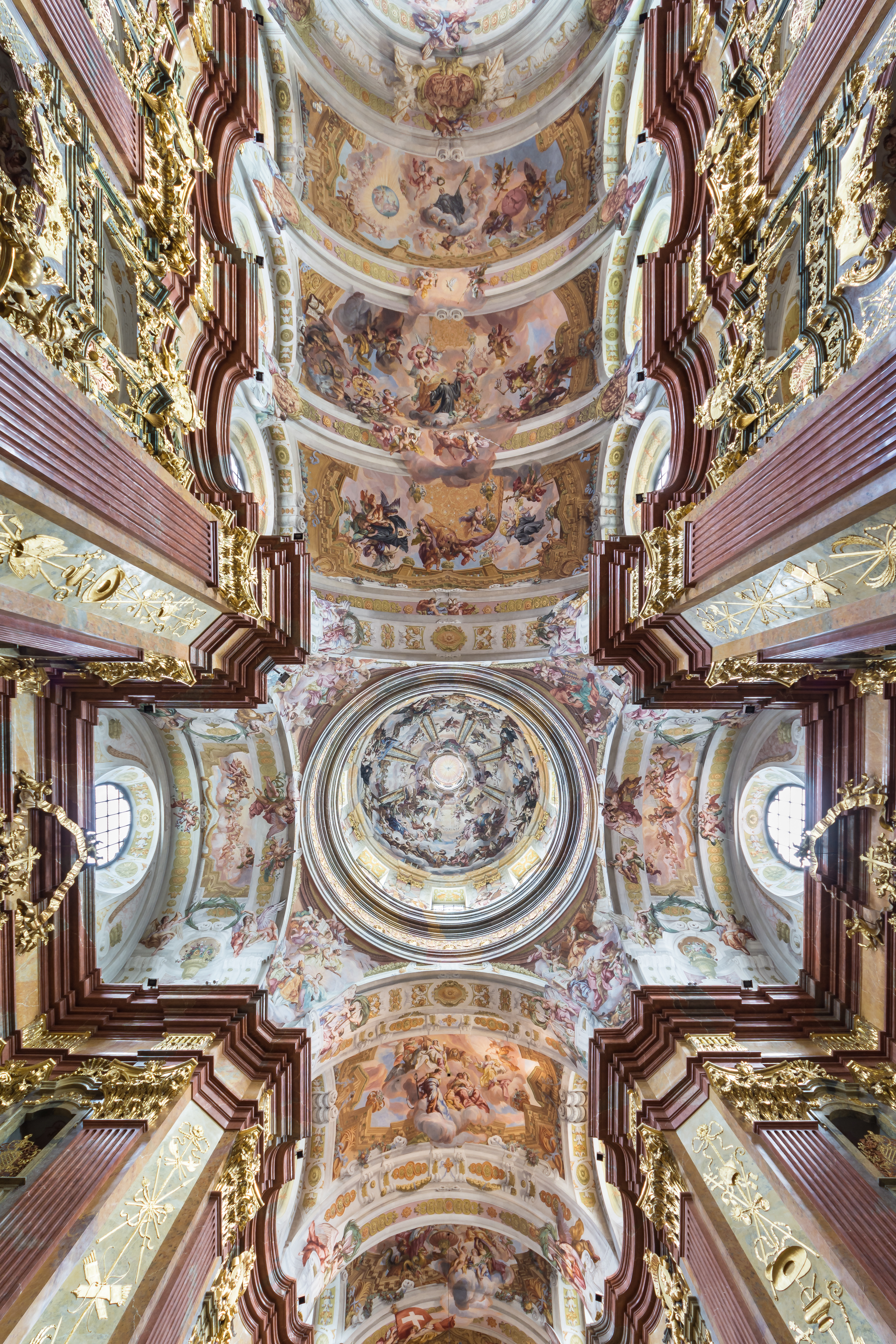
Roof frescos in Melk Abbey, Austria. The appearance of the churches in Santiago de los Caballeros de Guatemala was similar to this Austrian abbey before they were destroyed by the Santa Marta earthquakes in 1773.

On 12 June 1773 Capitain General Martín de Mayorga was inaugurated, and alongside Cortés y Larráz and the regular clergy vicars, were the top authorities in the Kingdom of Guatemala and would be the main characters in the events that followed the 1773 earthquakes. In May 1773 soft tremors began to be felt, but gradually they were increasing in intensity and on 11 June 1773 an earthquake damaged several houses and buildings; after that soft tremors continued, but on 29 July 1773, day of Santa Marta de Bethania, a catastrophic earthquake occurred. Large damages occurred across the city, but not all of it was completely destroyed. In spite of that, Captain General Martín de Mayorga asked the king of Spain for permission to move the city to a new location on 21 July 1775. Permission was granted on 2 January 1776, and the new location chosen is where the modern Guatemala City sits, by then led by Captain General Matías de Gálvez y Gallardo. On the other hand, Cortés y Larraz opposed the move, as he realized that it would represent a loss of both power and revenue for his archdiocese; besides the convents and temples needed to be built again, and he did not have enough money to support that.

=== Substitution ===
On 26 November 1777, Cayetano Francos y Monroy was appointed as the new archbishop of Guatemala, a difficult task given that Cortés y Larraz, was totally opposed to the move of his diocese to the new capital of Guatemala. Initially, Francos y Monroy decided to postpone the appointment but on 20 November 1778 was pressured by the Spanish crown, and therefore had to sail from Cádiz in early May 1779. He brought along a large group for support which was carefully chosen as they had a well defined political goal: take control of the Guatemalan secular clergy, which was in almost open rebellion.

On 7 October 1779 Francos y Monroy made his public entrance in the new Guatemala City escorted by eight knights; the city was barely beginning to be built and a month earlier, Cortés y Larraz issued a public letter denouncing the arrival of an illegitimate bishop and threatening him with excommunication. Francos y Monroy, however, took immediate measures, such as naming a new priests for the native town of Jocotenango and travelling to the destroyed Santiago de los Caballeros de Guatemala to gather the Santa Rosa nuns and bring them to the new city. He had set his mind on the move of the saint sculptures for November 1779 and spent a lot of money to finish construction of the Carmel and Capuchins convents.

== Death ==
Tired of fighting his successor, Cortés y Larraz fled and went back to Spain in 1779 where he was appointed as bishop of Tortosa. He resigned in 1786 and retired to Zaragoza, Spain, where he died in 1787.

== Notes and references ==
=== Bibliography ===
- Belaubre, Christophe (2013). "Francos y Monroy, Cayetano: Aspectos de la vida del arzobispo de Guatemala que vinó para retomar el control de un clero guatemalteco en estado de rebelión casi abierto" (in Spanish). Archived from the original on 22 July 2017.
- Cadena, Felipe (1774). Breve descripción de la noble ciudad de Santiago de los Caballeros de Guatemala y puntual noticia de su lamentable ruina ocasionada de un violento terremoto el día veintinueve de julio de 1773 (PDF) (in Spanish). Mixco, Guatemala: Oficina de Antonio Sánchez Cubillas.
- Cortés y Larraz, Pedro (2001) [1770]. García, Jesús María; Blasco, Julio Martín (eds.). Descripción Geográfico-Moral de la Diócesis de Goathemala. Corpus Hispanorum de Pace. Segunda Serie (in Spanish). Consejo Superior de Investigaciones Científicas. ISBN 9788400080013. ISSN 0589-8056.
- Juarros, Domingo (1818). Compendio de la historia de la Ciudad de Guatemala. Guatemala: Ignacio Beteta.
- Melchor Toledo, Johann Estuardo (2011). "El arte religioso de la Antigua Guatemala, 1773-1821; crónica de la emigración de sus imágenes" (PDF). Tesis doctoral en Historia del Arte (in Spanish). México, D.F.: Universidad Nacional Autónoma de México. Archived from the original (PDF) on 17 December 2014.
- Ministerio de Educación de El Salvador (1994). Historia de El Salvador (in Spanish). Vol. Tomo I. México D.F.: Comisión Nacional de los Libros de Texto Gratuitos.
- Moncada Maya, J. Omar (2003). "En torno a la destrucción de la Ciudad de Guatemala, 1773. Una carta del Ingeniero Militar Antonio Marín". Biblio 3W. Revista Bibliográfica de Geografía y Ciencias Sociales (in Spanish). VIII (444). Barcelona: Universidad de Barcelona. ISSN 1138-9796. Archived from the original on 23 June 2003.
- Orozco, Fernando (2004). Gobernantes de México (in Spanish). Panorama. p. 484. ISBN 9789683802606.
- Rodríguez Girón, Zoila; Flores, José Alejandro; Garnica, Marlen (1995). Laporte, L.P; Escobedo, H. (eds.). "El real palacio de Antigua Guatemala: arqueología y propuesta de rehabilitación" (PDF). Simposio de investigaciones arqueológicas en Guatemala (in Spanish). Guatemala: Museo Nacional de Arquelogía y Etnología. Archived from the original (PDF) on 14 September 2011.

Catholic Church titles
Preceded by Francisco José de Figueredo y Victoria	Archbishop of Guatemala; 1767-1779	Succeeded by Cayetano Francos y Monroy
