= San Pedro Sacatepéquez, San Marcos =

San Pedro Sacatepéquez
- Municipality of Guatemala

- Location in Guatemala
- Coordinates: 14°58′00″N 91°46′00″W
- Country: Guatemala
- Department: San Marcos

Government
  - Mayor: Carlos Bautista (PRI)

Area
  - Municipality of Guatemala: 44 sq mi (114 km^{2})
- Elevation: 7,640 ft (2,330 m)

Population (2018 census)
  - Municipality of Guatemala: 79,158
  - Density: 1,800/sq mi (694/km^{2})
  - Urban: 49,589
- Climate: Cwb

San Pedro Sacatepéquez (Spanish pronunciation: [sam ˈpeðɾo sakateˈpekes]) is a city, with a population of 49,589 (2018 census), and a municipality in the San Marcos department of Guatemala. The municipality covers an area of 114 km^{2} at an altitude of 2330 metres and has a population of 79,158 (2018 census).

The city of San Pedro was named after Saint Peter Apostle, and a rooster is the official mascot. People born in the City are known as "Shecanos" because of a local pastry "sheca" that is famous throughout Guatemala. The City is located en route to the city of Quetzaltenango in a valley called La Ermita y la Esmeralda and is directly adjacent to the city of San Marcos. There is a strong rivalry with the capital city of the province of San Marcos that has existed from its beginnings. This rivalry manifests itself mostly at sporting events with some events unfortunately turning violent. San Pedro is thought by some to be the real capitol of the department because for many years the majority of businesses were located there as opposed to San Marcos however, universities, private schools and a military school are within San Marcos. The area as a whole is also known for its sweaters and warm clothing. It has a large market near the town square. The Mayan population wears some of the most colorful typical garments in the country, usually bright yellows, greens and blues. The indigenous population in San Marcos speaks both the ancient Mayan language Mam and Spanish.

== History ==
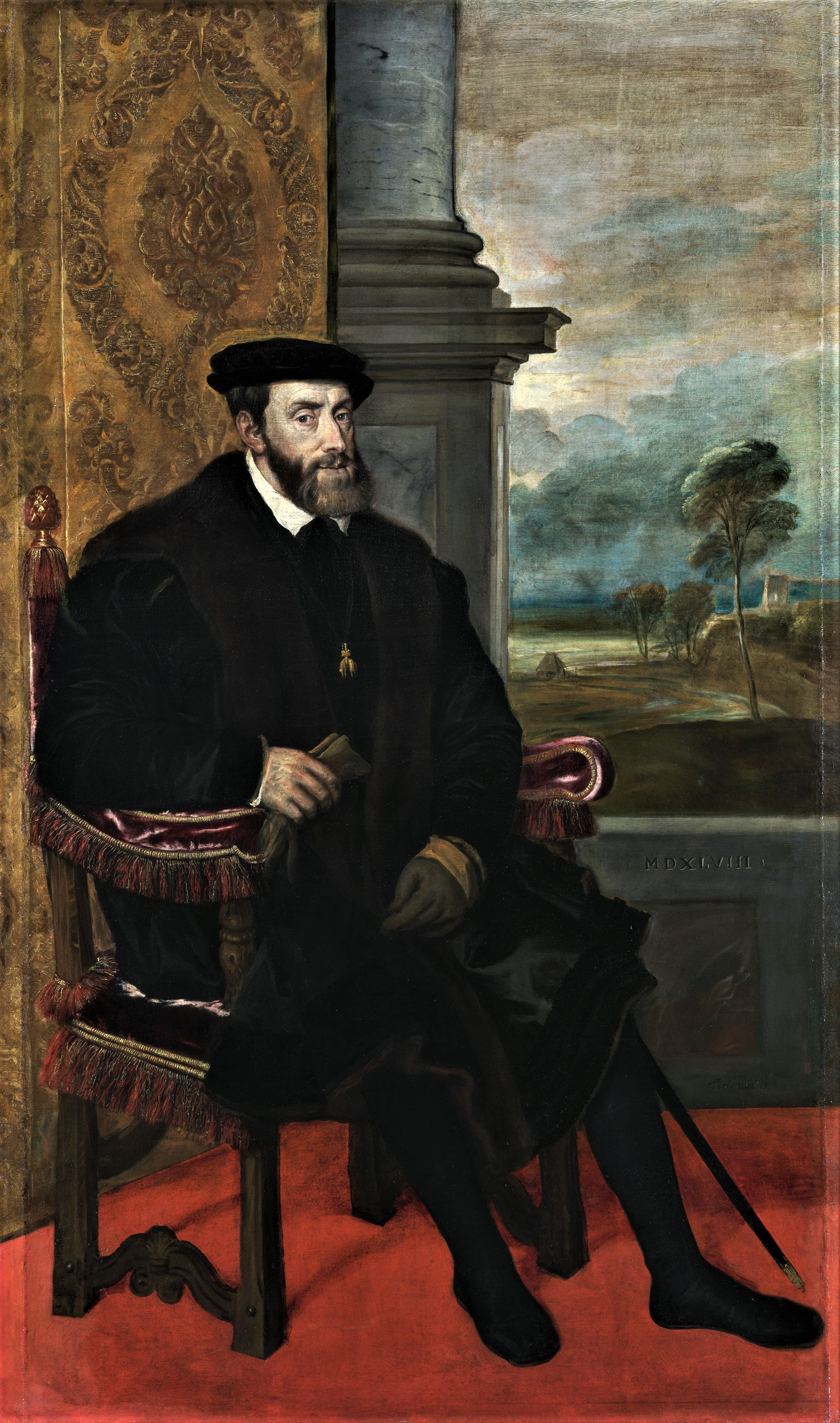
Emperor Carlos V of Spain in 1548. Paintin from Titian.

The first documented historical account of San Pedro Sacatepéquez is from 1 May 1543, when in Barcelona, Spain a Royal letter from emperor Carlos V thanked the services of the people from Sacatepéquez during the pacific conquest of Lacandón and the Verapaz, granting them special privileges.

=== After the Independence of Central America ===
On 13 October 1876, according to decree 165 of the government of Justo Rufino Barrios and considering that it was convenient to improve the condition of the natives and a petition from some leaders from San Pedro Sacatepéquez, then president Barrios authorized that, for legal purposes, the natives from San Pedro Sacatepéquez be declared ladinos so they could use western clothing. (Note: This decree was active until it was cancelled by decree #1719 of 29 August 1935, issued by president general Jorge Ubico.)

=== 1897 Quetzaltenango Revolt ===
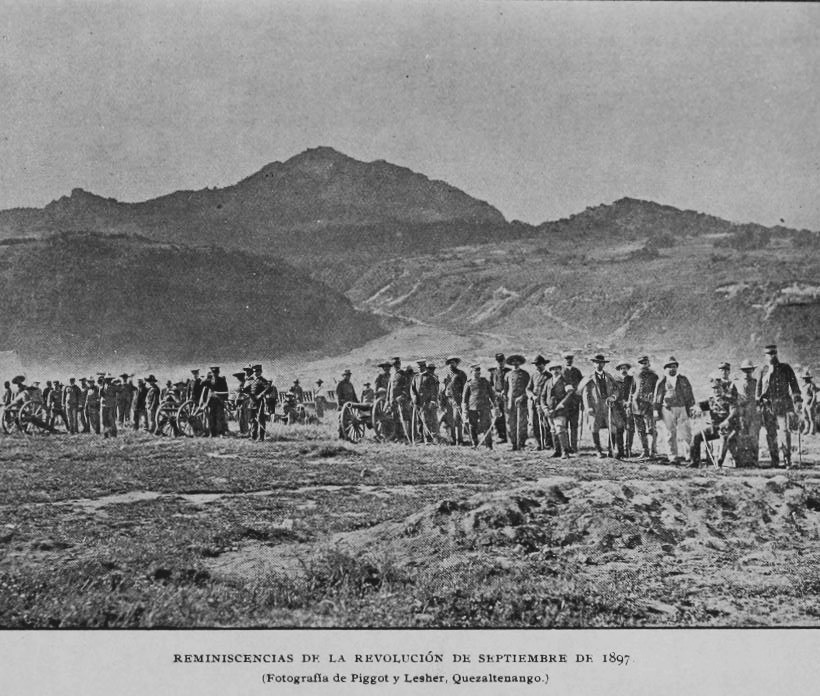
General García León brigade on the Totonicapan fields. Army forces loyal to president Reina Barrios

In September 1897, after the failure of both the interoceanic railroad and the Central American Expo and the deep economic crisis that Guatemala was facing after the plummeting of both coffee and silver international prices, Quetzaltengo people raised in arms against the decision of present José María Reina Barrios to extend his presidential term until 1902. (Note: Back then, the Panama Canal had not been built yet and Reina Barrios had high hopes on getting international investors interested in the interoceanic railroad, which was the main event for the Central American Expo; unfortunately, due to the economic crisis, and bad budgeting, the government could not complete the railroad and after the failure of the Expo, it had to take drastic austerity measures, that included closing schools.) A group of rebels, among them a former Secretary of Reina Barrios's cabinet -Próspero Morales-, began to combat on 7 September 1897 attacking San Marcos; after several battles and some gains, the rebels were definitely defeated on 4 October 1897. As a result, on 23 October 1897, San Pedro Sacatepéquez became the capital of San Marcos Department.

=== 20th century ===
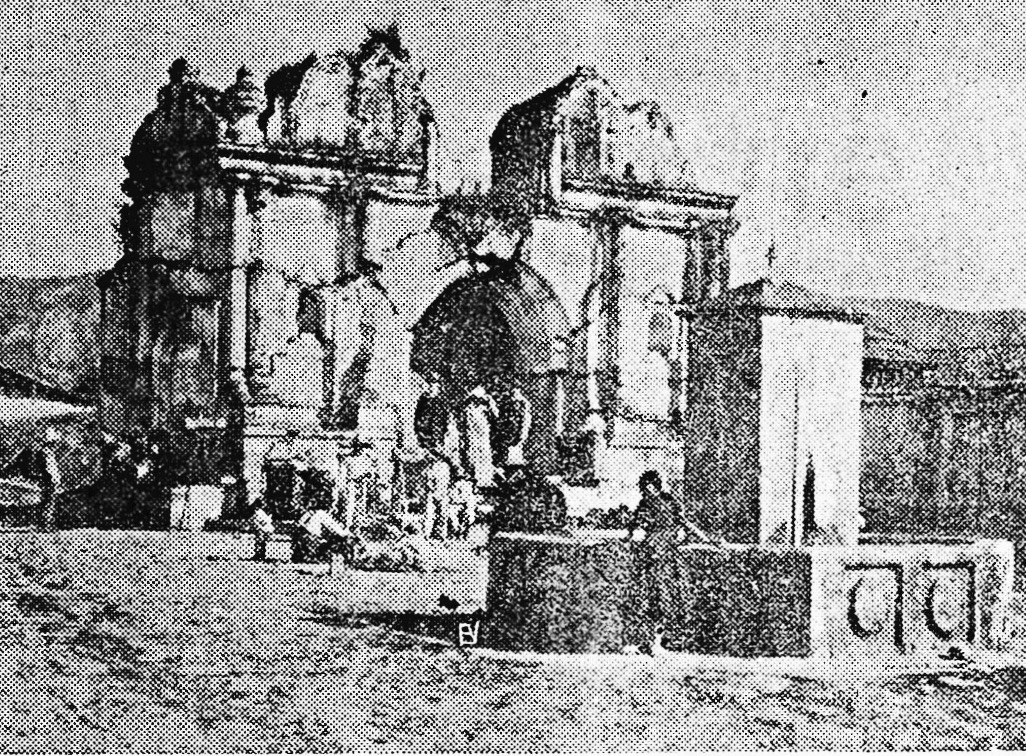
San Pedro Sacatepéquez catholic church ruins in 1925. It was destroyed along the rest of the town by the 1902 Volcán Santa María eruption.

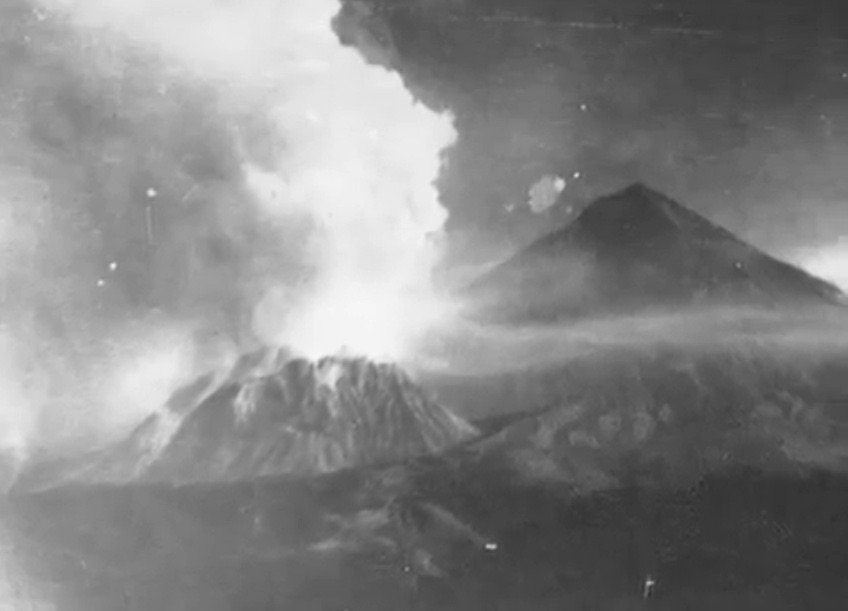
Volcán Santa María eruption in 1902 which destroyed the town.

In 1902 the eruption of the Santa María volcano in the neighboring department of Quetzaltenango was responsible for the destruction of the twin towns of San Marcos and San Pedro Sacatepéquez. Before 1902 the volcano had been dormant for at least 500 years and possibly several thousand years, but its awakening was clearly indicated by a seismic swarm in the region starting in January 1902, which included a major earthquake in April 1902. The eruption began on 24 October, and the largest explosions occurred over the following two days, ejecting an estimated 5.5 cubic kilometres (1.3 cu mi) of magma.

The pumice formed in the climactic eruption fell over an area of about 273,000 square kilometres (105,000 sq mi), and volcanic ash was detected as far away as San Francisco, 4,000 kilometres (2,500 mi) away. The eruption tore away much of the south-western flank of the volcano, leaving a crater about 1 kilometre (0.6 mi) in diameter and about 300 metres (980 ft) deep, stretching from just below the summit to an elevation of about 2,300 metres (7,500 ft). The first evidence of the eruption was a sprinkling of sand on Quezaltenango. The wind then changed from the south to the east and ashes began to fall at Helvetia, a coffee plantation six miles to the South-West. Because of the lack of previous Holocene activity at Santa María, local people did not recognise the preceding seismicity as warning signs of an eruption. At least 5,000 people died as a result of the eruption itself, and a subsequent outbreak of malaria killed many more.

The towns were rebuilt and on 3 December 1926, San Pedro was designated as a city, but on 16 December 1935, it was annexed to San Marcos forming the municipality of La Unión San Marcos. However, this system did not work and La Unión San Marcos was broken apart on 20 July 1945, but San Pedro Sacatepéquez lost the capital of San Marcos Department to the municipality of San Marcos.

On 21 August 1940 the main fair of the town was set to be celebrated on the last week of June, being the main event on 29 June, day of the Apostles Saint Peter and Saint Paul. The celebration is known as "Flor de Retana" (Spanish: Flower of Retana) and the people dresses up with vintage ceremonial clothing to celebrate their ancestors.

== Culture ==
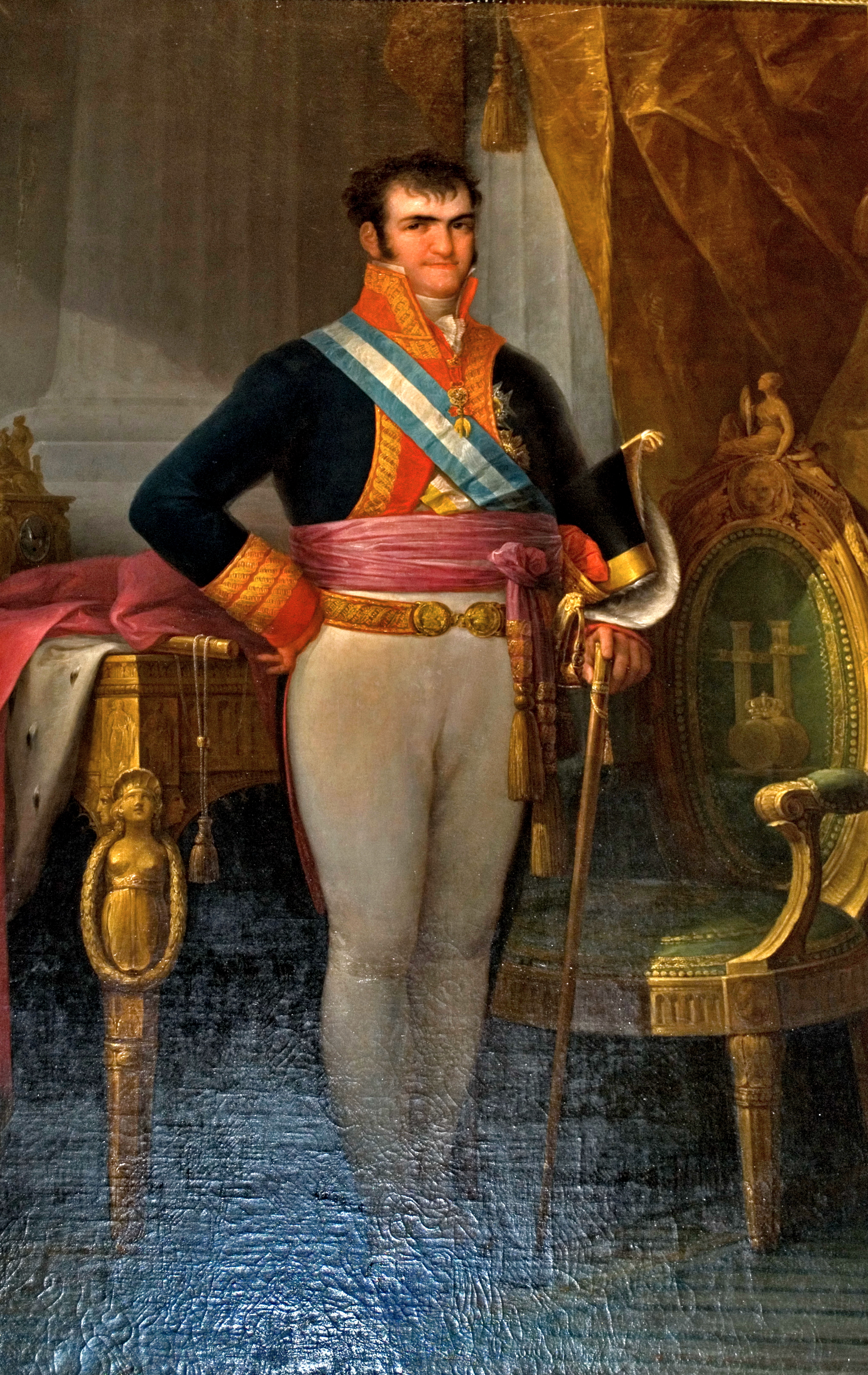
Fernando VII.

=== Catholic church bell ===
The bell is the oldest of its kind in Central America as it was put in place by friar Francisco Bravo, O.P. in 1577. On the top of the bell one can read the inscription "Año de 1577" (Spanish: "Year of 1577") and a Latin prayer "Pro Novis Virgo María alleluya ore tuorpis". (Note: Virgen Mary, in your glory, pray for us insistently.); in the midsection it has a Spanish inscription that read "Siendo comendador el Padre Francisco Bravo, año MDLXXVII" (Spanish: When father Francisco Bravo was in charge of this town, year 1577); and, finally, at the bottom one can read "Ptrus Apostulus et Paulus. Doctor genetium-ipsinos-Docueon. Legetuan Domine". (Note: Peter Apostle and Paul, physician of people. They taught the Word of the Lord.) It is now inside the church, close to the main entrance; it is one meter high, with an outer diameter of 0.95m and is 0.08 m thick; it weighs half a ton. Over the centuries it has developed cracks that rendered it useless for its main purpose.

=== Letter from Carlos V ===
In a Royal communication, dated in Barcelona, Spain in 1543, Spanish Emperor Carlos V, among other things, thanks native chief Pedro from Sacatepéquez his help for friars Pedro de Angulo, Rodrigo de Ladrada and Bartolomé de las Casas, O.P. during the pacific conquest of the Teculiclán and Lacandón provinces (which became the Verapaces), a process known as the "Tezulutlan Capitulations".

=== Silver medal from king Fernando VII ===
With 2.54 cm in diameter and 1 cm thick, this medal was a gift from king Fernando VII to the people of San Pedro Sacatepéquez. On the tail side one can read the inscription "A la fiel generosidad de los indios del reyno de Guatemala" (Spanish: "To the loyal generosity of the Indians of the Kingdom of Guatemala. On the flip side, on top says "Viva Fernando VII rey de España e Indias." (Spanish: Long life to king Fernando VII of Spain and the Indies") and the bottom it reads "Año de 1,809" (Spanish:Year of 1809).

== Sports ==
Deportivo San Pedro football club have been playing in the second tier of Guatemalan football since 1996; its play its home games in the Estadio Municipal San Pedro Sacatepequez.

== Climate ==
San Pedro Sacatepéquez has temperate climate (Köppen: Cwb). But climate change has already begun to heat this municipality as well as the surrounding municipalities.

Climate data for San Pedro Sacatepéquez
Month	Jan	Feb	Mar	Apr	May	Jun	Jul	Aug	Sep	Oct	Nov	Dec	Year
Mean daily maximum °C (°F)	17.5 (63.5)	18.1 (64.6)	19.6 (67.3)	20.7 (69.3)	20.7 (69.3)	19.9 (67.8)	19.9 (67.8)	20.4 (68.7)	19.8 (67.6)	19.1 (66.4)	18.6 (65.5)	18.1 (64.6)	19.4 (66.9)
Daily mean °C (°F)	10.1 (50.2)	10.5 (50.9)	12.0 (53.6)	13.7 (56.7)	14.9 (58.8)	14.9 (58.8)	14.8 (58.6)	14.7 (58.5)	14.7 (58.5)	13.9 (57.0)	12.2 (54.0)	11.3 (52.3)	13.1 (55.7)
Mean daily minimum °C (°F)	2.8 (37.0)	3.0 (37.4)	4.5 (40.1)	6.7 (44.1)	9.2 (48.6)	10.0 (50.0)	9.7 (49.5)	9.0 (48.2)	9.7 (49.5)	8.7 (47.7)	5.9 (42.6)	4.5 (40.1)	7.0 (44.6)
Average precipitation mm (inches)	7 (0.3)	5 (0.2)	28 (1.1)	69 (2.7)	231 (9.1)	345 (13.6)	270 (10.6)	298 (11.7)	306 (12.0)	218 (8.6)	18 (0.7)	14 (0.6)	1,809 (71.2)
Source: Climate-Data.org

== Geographic location ==
San Pedro Sacatepéquez is at 249 km west of Guatemala City and 48 km from Quetzaltenango. However, it is only one km away from San Marcos.

== See also ==
- Carlos V
- Fernando VII
- San Marcos, San Marcos
