= Regular clergy =

Clerics in the Catholic Church who follow a rule of life

Regular clergy, also known as regulars, are clerics in the Catholic Church who follow a rule (Latin: regula) of life, and are therefore also members of religious institutes. Secular clergy are clerics who are not bound by a rule of life.

== Terminology and history ==
The observance of the Rule of Saint Benedict procured for Benedictine monks at an early period the name of "regulars". The Council of Verneuil (755) so refers to them in its third canon, and in its eleventh canon speaks of the "ordo regularis" as opposed to the "ordo canonicus", formed by the canons who lived under the bishop according to the canonical regulations.

There was question also of a "regula canonicorum", or "regula canonica", especially after the extension of the rule which Chrodegang, Bishop of Metz, had drawn up from the sacred canons (766). And when the canons were divided into two classes in the eleventh century, it was natural to call those who added religious poverty to their common life regulars, and those who gave up the common life, seculars. The 821 Chronicle of St. Bertin mentions "sæculares canonici". In fact as the monks were said to leave the world, sometimes those persons who were neither clerics nor monks were called seculars, as at times were clerics not bound by the rule.

Sometimes also the name "regulars" was applied to the canons regular to distinguish them from monks. Thus the collection of Gratian (about 1139) speaks of canons regular, who make canonical profession, and live in a regular canonicate, in opposition to monks who wear the monastic habit, and live in a monastery. But the Decretals of Gregory IX, promulgated 5 September 1234, use the word "regularis" in a more general sense, in book III, ch. xxxi, which is entitled "De regularibus et transeuntibus ad religionem". However in ch. xxxv "De statu monachorum et canonicorum regularium" the distinction returns, disappearing in the corresponding book and chapter of the Decretals of Boniface VIII (3 March 1298), which is entitled merely "De statu regularium" and reappearing in the collection of Clementines (25 October 1317) but with the conjunction vel, which indicates the resemblance between them.

From that time, while the word "religious" is more generally used, the word "regular" was reserved for members of religious orders with solemn vows. Those who have taken simple vows in the Society of Jesus were also regulars in the proper sense according to the Constitution "Ascendente" of Pope Gregory XIII. Before the publication of the Code of Canon Law of 1917, writers were not agreed on the question whether the religious of other orders can properly be called regulars before solemn profession, but it was agreed that novices of religious orders were regulars only in the wider meaning of the word.

In the 1917 Code of Canon Law, the word "regulars" was officially defined as those who have made their vows in a "religion" (what in the 1983 Code is called a religious institute).

== Contemporary roles ==
The Second Vatican Council's Decree concerning the Pastoral Office of Bishops in the Church (1965) set the ministry of religious clergy within the context of the diocesan organisation of the Catholic Church and the pastoral role of the diocesan bishops:

Religious priests are by consecration assumed into the responsibilities of the presbyterate so as to become themselves the prudent cooperators of the episcopal order. Today they can be of even greater help to bishops in view of the greater needs of souls. Therefore, they can be said in a real sense to belong to the clergy of the diocese inasmuch as they share in the care of souls and in carrying out works of the apostolate under the authority of the prelates.

The technical juridical term "regular" does not appear as such in the current 1983 Code of Canon Law, which does, however, use the phrase "canons regular".

== See also ==
- Canon regular
- Cleric regular
