= Rococo architecture in Portugal =

Palace of Queluz, Sintra, begun 1747.

Rococo architecture entered Portugal through the north, while Lisbon, due to the court pomp, remained in the Baroque.

== Description ==
It is an architecture that follows the international taste in decoration, and, as a result of the contrast between dark granite and white walls, has a clearly Portuguese profile. The decoration is naturalist, based mainly in shells and leaves but also with architectural elements and sculpture. Pilgrimage places became fashionable, often built in places of rough prominence, allowing impressive staircases of big scenographic effect. André Soares worked in the region of Braga, and produced some of the main examples such as Falperra Church, Congregados Basilica, the Braga City Hall, and Raio Palace, among many others.The number of buildings and architects is large and, because the north of Portugal was spared from the ravages of the 1755 Lisbon earthquake, there is a large number of buildings.

In the south, as a result of the lower population density, the court taste and also of the consequence of the earthquake there are fewer rococo buildings. But there still remain many examples such as the Palace of Queluz. Designed by Mateus Vicente de Oliveira, it became the residence of the royal family under the reign of Queen Maria I. Made according to the French taste for prince Dom Pedro, King José’s brother, it is characterized by good taste and elegance. It boasts Rococo gardens and water games in a large park. The interior is decorated with paintings, sculptures, mirrors, tile, and gilded woodcarving. The chapel, as a result of the junction of carved wood, marble and coloured stones, reflects a classical taste unusual in the Portuguese Rococo. The building received subsequent extensions during the neoclassical period.

Lisbon’s main Rococo church, the Estrela Basilica, is the last major Rococo building in the city, showing the influence of Palace of Mafra, but has also undeniable similarities with Pombaline style churches, particularly in the front. The elegant towers and dome cannot hide the Pombaline style vocabulary at the façade, despite the sculpture and relieves. The interior is covered with traditional Baroque coloured marbles.

== See also ==
- Rococo in Spain
- Pousada of D. Maria
- Colonial architecture of Brazil
