= Municipal Building =

Municipal Building may refer to the following places:

== United States ==
=== Arkansas ===
- Crossett Municipal Building, Crossett, AR
- Municipal Building (El Dorado, Arkansas), El Dorado, AR
- Texarkana, Arkansas, Municipal Building, Texarkana, AR

=== California ===
- Valley Municipal Building, Van Nuys, CA

=== Colorado ===
- Cañon City Municipal Building, Cañon City, CO

=== Connecticut ===
- Municipal Building (Hartford, Connecticut)

=== Florida ===
- Holly Hill Municipal Building, Holly Hill, FL

=== Georgia ===
- Cochran Municipal Building and School, Cochran, GA

=== Illinois ===
- Berwyn Municipal Building, Berwyn, IL
- St. Charles Municipal Building, St. Charles, IL

=== Iowa ===
- Municipal Building (Ames, Iowa)
- Municipal Building (Des Moines, Iowa), listed on the NRHP in Iowa

=== Kentucky ===
- Junction City Municipal Building, Junction City, KY, listed on the NRHP in Kentucky

=== Louisiana ===
- Bossier City Municipal Building, Bossier City, LA
- Shreveport Municipal Building, Shreveport, LA, listed on the NRHP in Louisiana

=== Maine ===
- Municipal Building (Rumford, Maine), listed on the NRHP in Maine

=== Massachusetts ===
- Fields Corner Municipal Building, Boston, MA
- Norwood Memorial Municipal Building, Norwood, MA
- Reading Municipal Building, Reading, MA
- Westfield Municipal Building, Westfield, MA

=== Michigan ===
- Ishpeming Municipal Building, Ishpeming, MI

=== Minnesota ===
- Kasson Municipal Building, Kasson, MN

=== Mississippi ===
- Municipal Building (Meridian, Mississippi)

=== New Mexico ===
- Las Vegas Municipal Building, Las Vegas, NM, listed on the NRHP in New Mexico

=== New York (state) ===
- Lancaster Municipal Building (Lancaster, New York)
- Bronx Borough Hall, in New York City
- Brooklyn Municipal Building, in New York City
- Manhattan Municipal Building, also known as Municipal Building, in New York City
- Municipal Building (New York, New York)
- Municipal Building (Oneonta, New York)
- Newark Valley Municipal Building and Tappan-Spaulding Memorial Library, Newark Valley, NY

=== North Carolina ===
- Henderson Fire Station and Municipal Building, Henderson, NC
- Hickory Municipal Building, Hickory, NC
- Morehead City Municipal Building, Morehead City, NC
- New Bern Municipal Building, New Bern, NC

=== Ohio ===
- Municipal Building (Springfield, Ohio)
- Norwood Municipal Building, Norwood, OH

=== Oklahoma ===
- Oklahoma City Municipal Building, Oklahoma City, OK, listed on the NRHP in Oklahoma
- Tulsa Municipal Building, Tulsa, OK, listed on the NRHP in Oklahoma

=== Pennsylvania ===
- Indiana Borough 1912 Municipal Building, Indiana, PA
- Municipal Building and Central Fire Station, 340, Scranton, PA

=== South Dakota ===
- Municipal Building-City Hall, Faith, SD

=== Tennessee ===
- Municipal Building (Chattanooga, Tennessee), listed on the NRHP in Tennessee

=== Texas ===
- Bryan Municipal Building, Bryan, TX, listed on the NRHP in Texas

=== Utah ===
- Ogden/Weber Municipal Building, Ogden, UT
- Price Municipal Building, Price, UT, listed on the NRHP in Utah
- Salina Municipal Building and Library, Salina, UT

=== Virginia ===
- Danville Municipal Building, Danville, VA
- Hopewell Municipal Building, Hopewell, VA

=== West Virginia ===
- Municipal Building (Bluefield, West Virginia)

=== Wisconsin ===
- Colfax Municipal Building, Colfax, WI
- Lancaster Municipal Building (Lancaster, Wisconsin)

== Elsewhere ==
- 181-187 Hay Street, Sydney, Australia, an historic building also known as the Municipal Building
- Municipal Building, Singapore
- Municipal Building, Calgary, Canada

== See also ==
- Seat of government
- Municipal Palace (disambiguation)
