= Municipal Palace =

Municipal Palace may refer to the following buildings:

- Chiantla Municipal Palace, Guatemala
- Banca Giuratale (Valletta), Malta
- Banca Giuratale (Mdina), Malta
- Municipal Palace, León, Guanajuato, Mexico
- Municipal Palace of Lima, Peru
- Braga Municipal Palace, Portugal

== See also ==
- Municipal Building
- City Hall (disambiguation)
- Palacio Municipal (disambiguation)
