= Gilded woodcarving in Portugal =

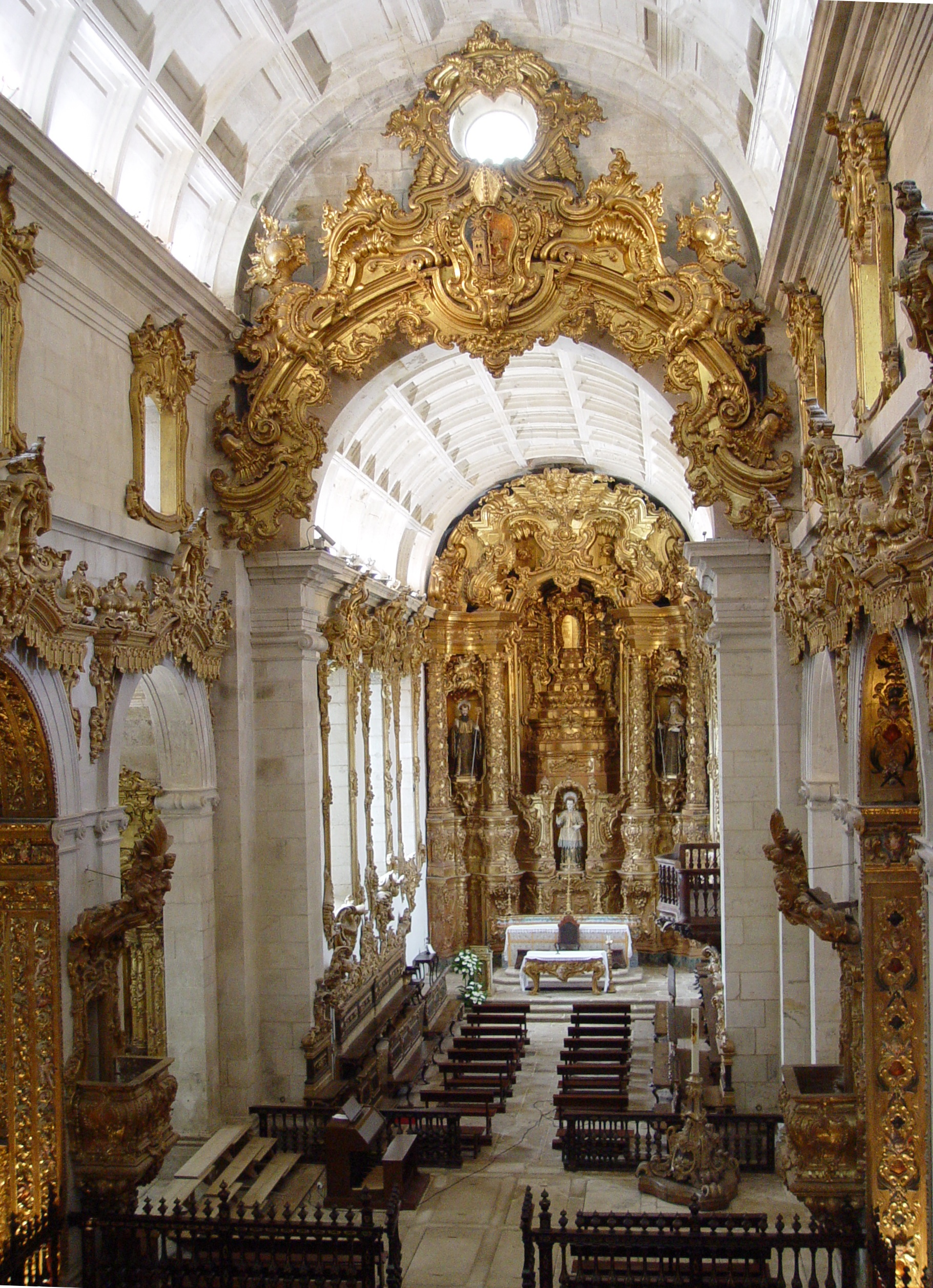
Gilded woodcarving in the monastery of Tibães, an example of Portuguese rococo, by the architect André Soares, 1757–1760, Braga

Gilded woodcarving in Portugal (Portuguese: talha dourada) is, along with azulejos, one of the country's most original and rich artistic expressions. It is usually used in the interior decoration of churches and cathedrals and of noble halls in palaces and large public buildings. An impressive collection of altarpieces are found in Portuguese churches. Originating in the Gothic era, Portuguese gilded woodcarving assumed a nationalist character during the 17th century and reached its height in the reign of King D. João V. In the 19th century it lost its originality and began to disappear with the end of the revival era.

== Comparison ==
Gilded woodcarving is a less expensive and more flamboyant artform than other technically more demanding types of decoration, such as sculpture or painting, although tile is also inexpensive. The amount of gold required is relatively small. It does not require the extensive training of a sculptor or painter. The forms are copied and adapted from decorative architecture and inspiration taken from books. During the 17th century, a typically Portuguese vocabulary developed. After being transported to the empire, it adapted to local traditions and artistic capacities, as is visible in Brazil or in India – mainly in Goa.

Artists take commissions from regional orders to guarantee the activity of their workshop, sometimes making several related works in a specific geographical area. Examples exist in colour, white or natural wood, but without the visual impact of the gilded carvings.

== Gothic, and Renaissance Manueline ==
Gilded woodcarving in Portugal started during the Gothic period following architectural models, taken mainly from sculpture and goldsmithery, using the decorative vocabulary of the style. Gothic arches, pinnacles, columns, etc., are associated with sculpture or painting. The typical form was a wooden structure, with the gold carving kept for the architectural part of the “machine” and the rest of the elements left either in plain wood or covered with colour. In spite of the small number of surviving altarpieces (the overwhelming majority was replaced during the Baroque period), it is known that they followed the international taste, such as the main altarpiece in the old Cathedral of Coimbra.

The Manueline follows the vocabulary of architecture, using mainly the portal structure, giving importance to the heraldic, armillary sphere, Cross of Christ and sculpted naturalistic elements. The main examples, altarpiece and Choir Stalls, from Convent of the Order of Christ in Tomar and Monastery of Alcobaça, disappeared, but the monumental Choir Stalls from Santa Cruz Monastery in Coimbra remains. The wood gilt followed the approach of northern Europe, adjusted with the Portuguese aesthetic at the time and was made by Flemish master Machim.

The Renaissance followed the architectural decoration, but without golden carving, employing painting and sculpture and following the classic imagination from books of the time. The carved decoration in wood was close to the intended stone forms, visible in portals, tombs or even in goldsmithery. The preference for large altarpieces in stone or painting did not allow the development of woodcarving as an autonomous form of expression, leaving it a decorative art. The later Mannerism provided the necessary conditions for autonomous gilded woodcarving to arise.

== Mannerism ==
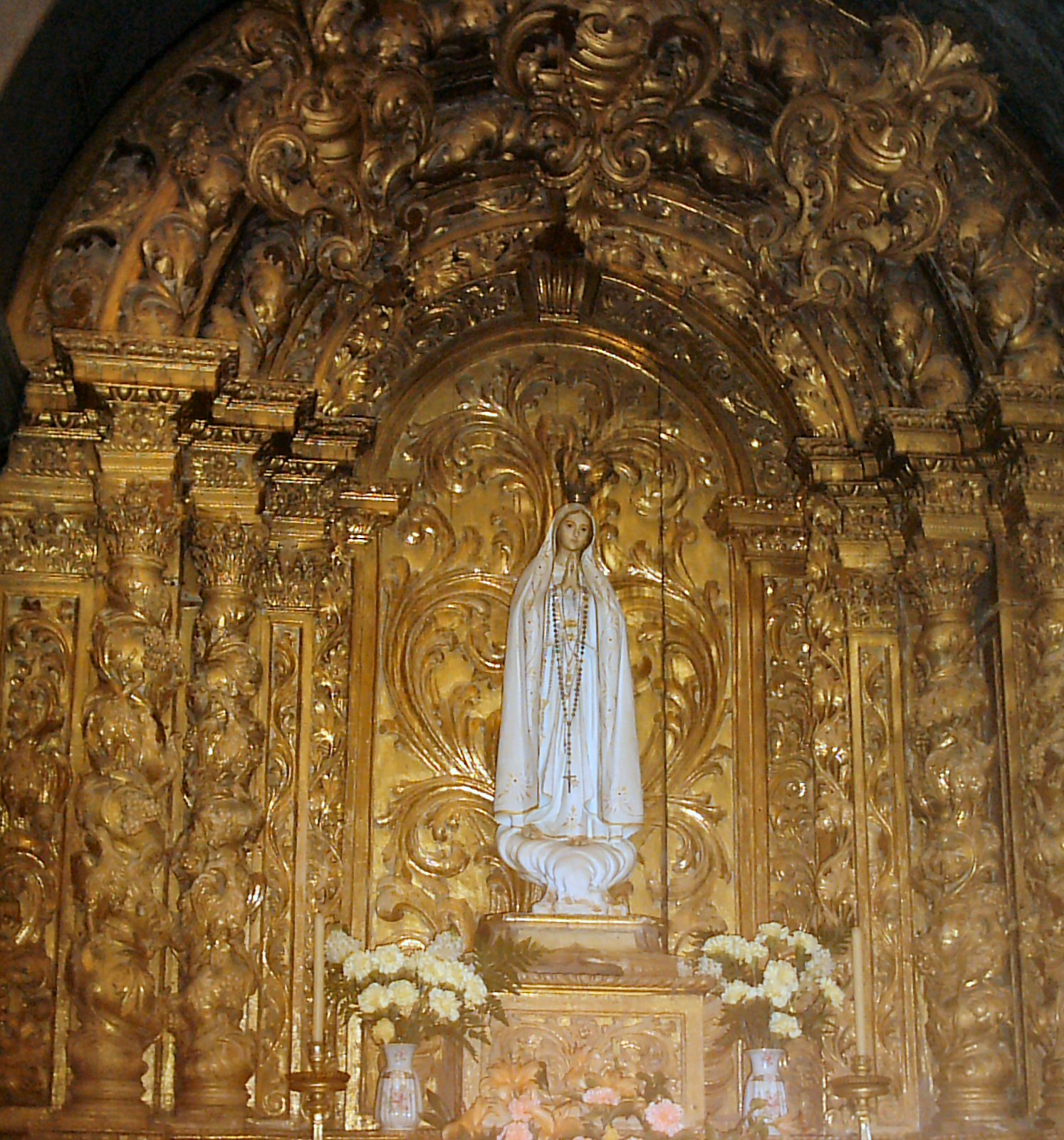
Altar in gilded woodcarving inside the church of Camarate

Economic and other factors led to the expansion of gilt woodcarving during the Mannerist era. The economic crisis at the end of the sixteenth century, the growing importance of the Jesuits, the loss of the spice trade and, finally, the death of King D. Sebastião in Alcácer Quibir, cause a gradual reduction of economic resources and the reduction of major programmes of expensive painting and sculpture, because they were considered a major art, and more subject to the rules imposed by the Council of Trent. Woodcarving was the perfect decorative type for a time of economic and spiritual crisis, a consequence of the rupture between Catholics and Protestants. The woodcarvings dazzled - giving the idea of wealth - and adapted to all directives of the Catholic Church, while essentially exploring the architectural form. The altarpiece became a composition of architectural character, often designed by architects and subsequently adapted by the artist. The carvings often covered an entire wall and operated as a picture frame. Woodcarving gained autonomy and left the simple task of framing works of art.

The set is built into floors, with several kinds of solutions. Triumph arches might be combined with sculpture, usually in the choir, allowing the space behind the decorated altarpiece to be seen. Examples include the monumental little-painted altarpieces of the choir at Church of São Domingos de Benfica and Church of Luz in Carnide - Lisbon and the highly painted Carnide altarpiece, executed by Francisco Venegas with the collaboration of Diogo Teixeira.

The main altarpiece of Church of São Roque in Lisbon belongs to another group, typical of the Jesuitical churches. São Roque in Lisbon is the head of the series for the whole Portuguese empire. It is characterized by its elaborate decoration, well-structured lines, with clear classical references, several floors, columns and well compartmentalised spaces. The scheme was much repeated in Jesuit churches. The Cathedral of Portalegre exhibits an important variation of this scheme. The painting altarpiece is framed by a classic set of columns, reliefs and sculpture.

== The Baroque ==
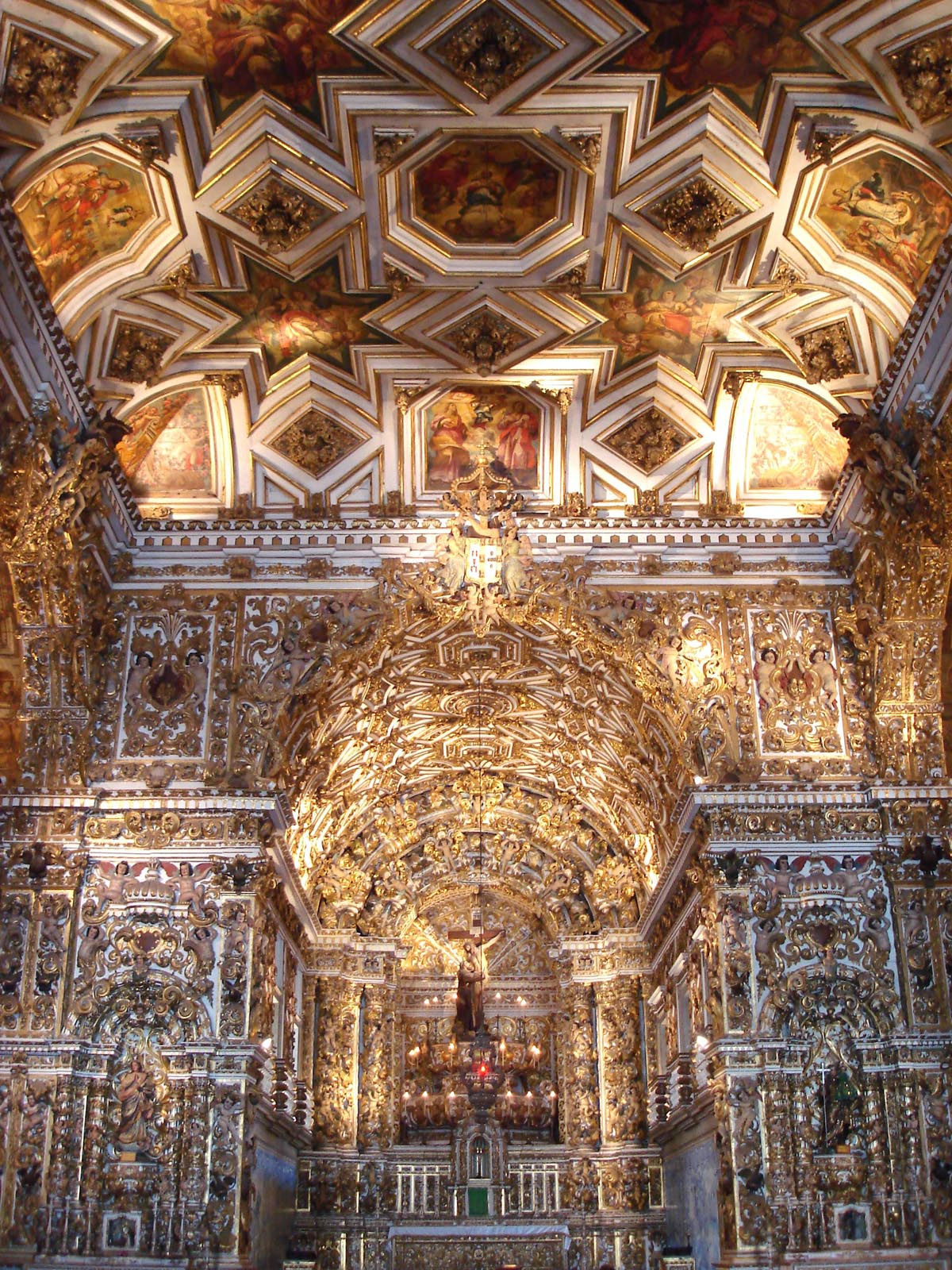
Baroque gilded woodcarving, São Francisco Church and Convent (1708–1752), Brazil

This period was the most monumental phase of woodwork in Portugal and Brazil.

With the end of 60 years of forced Iberian unification under the government of the Spanish kings Felipe II, III and IV, the restoration of independence in 1640 and subsequent war, woodcarving in Portugal detached from Spanish baroque models. In difficult economic times, woodcarving gained in meaning, as sculpture and painting were reduced in altarpieces, leaving behind the classical inspirations, taken from international books arriving through Spain. The inspiration is clearly taken from Romanesque and Manueline portals. The design flowed from the first while the decoration adopted the latter's naturalistic style.

The altarpiece resembles a powerful machine, built with concentric archivolts, classical spiral columns (pseudo salomonic), platforms and throne. The decoration is based mainly on dispersed leaves covering the whole set. The altarpiece is undoubtedly Baroque, although presenting characteristics clearly opposed to the Spanish models.

Iberian peace, and the discovery of Brazilian gold and diamonds make Portugal under King D. João V Europe's richest country, allowing the development of international Baroque art in all forms. Portuguese taste adjusted to international models and was baptised "Joanina". It converted the archivolts to trim cut, incorporated sculpture-like angels, garlands, vegetal-like forms, birds and architectural elements. It kept the spiral columns, gallery and throne. The decor is suggestive of sculpture and spreads throughout the church, covering every available surface - vaults, walls, columns, arches and pulpits. Notable examples are scattered from north to south, but the main ones are the Church of São Francisco (Porto) and Church of Santa Clara (Porto). Both were completely covered in baroque gilded woodcarving giving them the look of a golden cave. The most significant examples in Porto are the following:

- Monastery of Arouca.
- Sacrário of Monastery of Alcobaça.
- Igreja da Pena em Lisboa – main altar.
- Igreja de Santa Catarina em Lisboa – main altar.
- Igreja do convento de Nossa Senhora da Conceição de Marvila in Lisbon.
- Madre de Deus convent in Lisbon.
- Oporto Cathedral – main altar .
- Igreja de Santo Idelfonso no Porto – main altar.
- Church of Monastery of São Bento da Vitória in Oporto – main altar.
- Church of São Francisco (Porto) – a golden cave.
- Church of Santa Clara (Porto) – a golden cave.
- Braga Cathedral – monumental organs.
- Mosteiro de Jesus of Aveiro.
- Igreja de Santo António of Lagos – Choir.

The King owned gilded woodcarving carriages, among which are three baroque carriages used by his embassy to the Pope, now in the Museu Nacional dos Coches (National Carriages Museum), in Lisbon.

== The Rococo ==
King D. João V was succeeded by his son King D. José. The abundance of resources sustained the politics of splendour, based in diamonds and precious metals from Brazil, allowing for an architecture of luxury and modern decorative programmes, after Rococo. During the period Portugal survived its worst natural catastrophe and one of the worst in Europe - the 1755 Lisbon earthquake.

Rococo gilded woodcarving is subdivided into several currents or regional styles, allowing it to maintain variety and originality, from north to south. Shells, angels, volutes, leaves, puti, columns, spiral columns (pseudo-salomonic), painted materials and a lot of gold are its formal vocabulary.

Two major variations developed around Lisbon. Some works followed the royal house, characterized by elegance and the quality of the decorative motives, but with the Rococo vocabulary, and with influences remaining from the Joanina woodcarving and the chapel of São João Baptista in the Church of São Roque. Example include:

- Chapel of the Queluz National Palace – With painted materials simulating colour marbles, some gilded woodcarving, very elegant with a classic touch.
- Main altar in Madre de Deus convent in Lisbon - With Joanina influence, keeping gallery and throne, it has the typical vocabulary of Rococo. It is completely golden and perfectly integrated in the building.

The pombaline churches developed a different expression. The earthquake reconstruction used prefabricated materials. These buildings have internal Rococo decoration, painted materials in wood and plaster, gallery and throne in the main altar, columns, architectural forms, a few golden shapes, some painting (the work of Pedro Alexandrino de Carvalho is the most important) and sculpture. Examples include: Church of Santo António of Lisbon (built in the birthplace of St. Anthony), Church of the Encarnação, Magdalena Church and Basilica of Nossa Senhora dos Mártires. In less destroyed buildings, the aim was to harmonise the pombaline shapes with existing decor.

The non-sacred ("profane") French influence was visible. It was characterized by sumptuous decorations in gilded woodcarvings and/or plaster simulating materials, normally inside palaces. It was popular among the aristocracy. The main example is the throne room of the Queluz National Palace.

In the area of Coimbra a regional school started with the main altarpiece of the Church of the Monastery of Santa Cruz. Structures are Rococo, but the pombaline influence is obvious in painted marbles, columns, gallery and throne. The influence of "Joanina", mainly in the upper conclusion, with cute fronton and angel-like sculptures is visible.

The north of Portugal developed an impressive list of Rococo altarpieces, fusing Rococo and “Joanino”. The works were completely golden, associated with painting or sculpture.

Around Braga, thanks to the work of André Soares another regional school developed, characterized by the fusion of colour and gold, in altarpieces of great elegance and quality. These augur the approaching Classicist period. Examples are:

- Church of the Monastery of Tibães – Main altarpiece, arch of triumph and monumental organ.
- Carmo Church (Porto) - Chapel.
- Church of Nossa Senhora da Vitória (Porto) – Main altarpiece.
- Church of Santa Maria Madalena (Braga) - called Chapel of Falperra – Main altarpiece.

In southern Portugal woodcarving is less common because of the abundance of marble, obviating the need to develop timber structures imitating marble.. Notable examples in the Alentejo and Algarve are different from the rest of the country. This originality is particularly visible in Évora, in:

- Convent of Carmo (Évora)
- Convent of Remédios (Évora) - Absolutely remarkable.
- Convent of São José (Évora)
- Church of Mercês (Évora)
- São Francisco Church (Faro) - Remarkable mixture of gilded woodcarving and tile.

Carriages continued to bear carvings and gilt. The reign of Queen D. Maria I produced the latest major examples exhibited in the Museu Nacional dos Coches.

== Neoclassicism ==
Neoclassicism marked the end of quality woodcarving in Portugal. Few churches were built, supporting few examples. They follow the classical Roman models and because the requirement to respect classic architectural orders, cost their originality. Noteworthy examples include the Church of Ordem Terceira de São Francisco and the altar of Church of Lapa (Porto). Another important factor is the exile of the royal family to Brazil during the French invasion, where the country (The United Kingdom of Portugal and Brazil) concentrate its artistic investments. Seventeen years later, when the King returned, Romanticism was installed and gilded woodcarving had lost its meaning and originality, overwhelmed by the revivalist fashion.
