= Lancaster Municipal Building =

Lancaster Municipal Building may refer to:

- Lancaster Municipal Building (Lancaster, New York), listed on the National Register of Historic Places (NRHP)
- Lancaster Municipal Building (Lancaster, Wisconsin), listed on the NRHP in Grant County, Wisconsin
