= Richland Center City Auditorium =

Auditorium in Richland Center, Wisconsin

- U.S. National Register of Historic Places
- U.S. Historic district – Contributing property
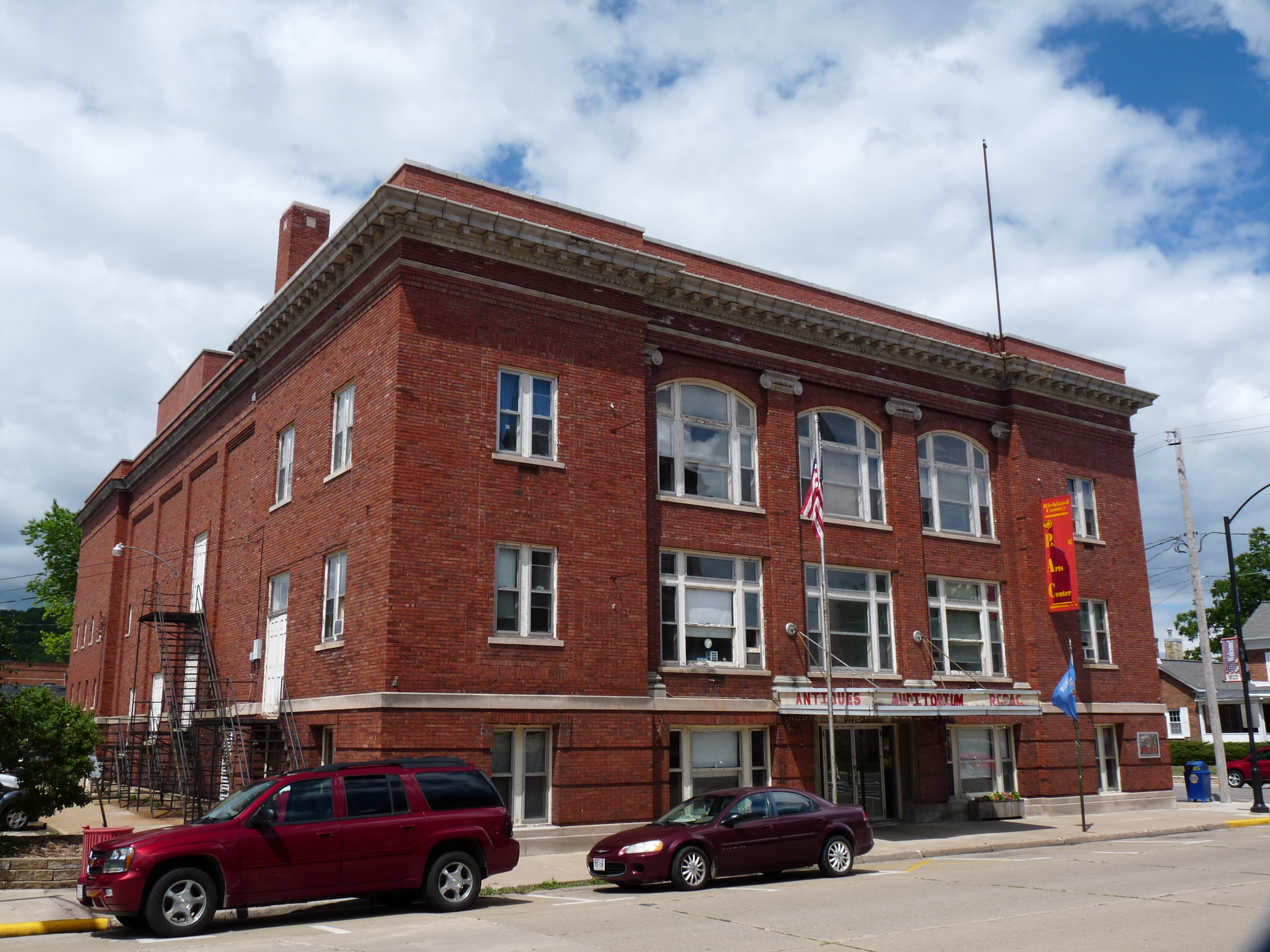
- The building in 2012

- Location within Wisconsin
- Interactive map showing the location of Richland Center City Auditorium
- Location: 182 N. Central Ave., Richland Center, Wisconsin
- Coordinates: 43°20′09″N 90°23′08″W
- Area: 1.4 acres (0.57 ha)
- Built: 1912
- Architect: Percey D. Bentley
- Architectural style: Neoclassical
- Part of: Court Street Commercial Historic District (ID89001955)
- NRHP reference No.: 80000182

Significant dates
- Added to NRHP: August 18, 1980
- Designated CP: November 13, 1989

The Richland Center City Auditorium is a three-story red brick public auditorium in Richland Center, Wisconsin. It was built in 1912 as a combination city hall, theatre, and clubhouse. The building was listed on the National Register of Historic Places in 1980 for its significance in local social and political history. It was also listed as a contributing structure to the Court Street Commercial Historic District in 1989. The auditorium currently houses the Richland County Performing Arts Center.

== History ==
The building is notable as one of the first in Wisconsin to combine the functions of a city hall with a theater under direct municipal management. Several older combination city hall and opera house buildings exist in the state, such as the Prairie du Chien City Hall and Hazel Green Town Hall, but their opera houses were typically leased and privately operated or used for school and volunteer events. The Richland Center chapter of the General Federation of Women's Clubs, a progressive reform and women's suffrage organization, was instrumental in promoting the concept of a mixed-used facility that would meet their city's needs for meeting space and sustainable revenue. The club led a campaign to persuade the all-male electorate to vote to borrow funds for the building in a 1911 city referendum. The club and its supporters also successfully lobbied the Wisconsin legislature to change state law in 1913 order to allow the city to operate the auditorium as an income-generating property.

When the building opened in 1913, it housed the city council chambers, offices for city officials, and meeting rooms for the local women's club and commercial club. The centerpiece of the building was a 926-seat auditorium with a 30 by 50 foot stage and fourteen dressing rooms. The theatre hosted a wide range of public events that attracted audiences from the surrounding countryside. In addition to entertainment offerings such as plays, concerts, and films, the auditorium also hosted educational lectures, school graduations, and political rallies. Notable political speakers in the building's first decade included William Jennings Bryan and William Howard Taft. The building received national publicity as a model of small-town civic enterprise and public management.

Following the success of the Richland Center City Auditorium, other Wisconsin cities built similar mixed-use facilities. Surviving examples include the 1916 Colfax Municipal Building in Colfax, Wisconsin and the 1923 Lancaster Municipal Building, in Lancaster, Wisconsin.

The Richland Center Auditorium continued to house the city government until 1998, when the city moved its offices to a new municipal building. The city subsequently deeded the auditorium to the Richland County Performing Arts Council, a private non-profit organization. The arts council began a restoration of the building in the 2010s and continues to operate the theatre as a performing arts venue.

== Architecture ==
Richland Center hired architect Percey Dwight Bentley of La Crosse, Wisconsin to design the building. Bentley was relatively new to architectural practice and had recently left architectural studies at the Armour Institute without completing a degree. He planned the auditorium in a highly simplified Neoclassical style evident in the concrete Ionic capitals that surmount the brick pilasters on the front facade, as well as in the dentils of the concrete cornice. The exterior otherwise features minimal ormentation, and consists primarily of red brick walls on a stone foundation.

The interior of the theater originally included painted mountain scenery and gold leaf ornamentation. A curved balcony provided additional seating. Much of the original interior decoration was lost in later renovations.
