= Palacio Municipal =

Palacio Municipal may refer to:

== City government headquarters ==
- Palacio Municipal de la Ciudad de Buenos Aires, Argentina
- Palacio Municipal de Zapopan, Jalisco, Mexico
- Palacio Municipal in San Miguel de Cozumel, Quintana Roo, Mexico
- Palacio Municipal de Lima, Peru
- Palacio Municipal de Miraflores, Lima, Peru
- Palacio Municipal (Montevideo), Uruguay
- Palacio Municipal de Caracas, Venezuela

== Sports facilities ==
- Palacio Municipal de Deportes de Granada, Granada, Spain
- Palacio Municipal de Deportes San Pablo, Seville, Spain
- Palacio de los Deportes de León, León, Spain

== Other places ==
- IFEMA Palacio Municipal, in Madrid, Spain
- Palacio Municipal (Mexibús), a BRT station in Nezahualcóyotl, Mexico
