= Court Street Commercial Historic District =

Historic district in Wisconsin, United States

- U.S. National Register of Historic Places
- U.S. Historic district
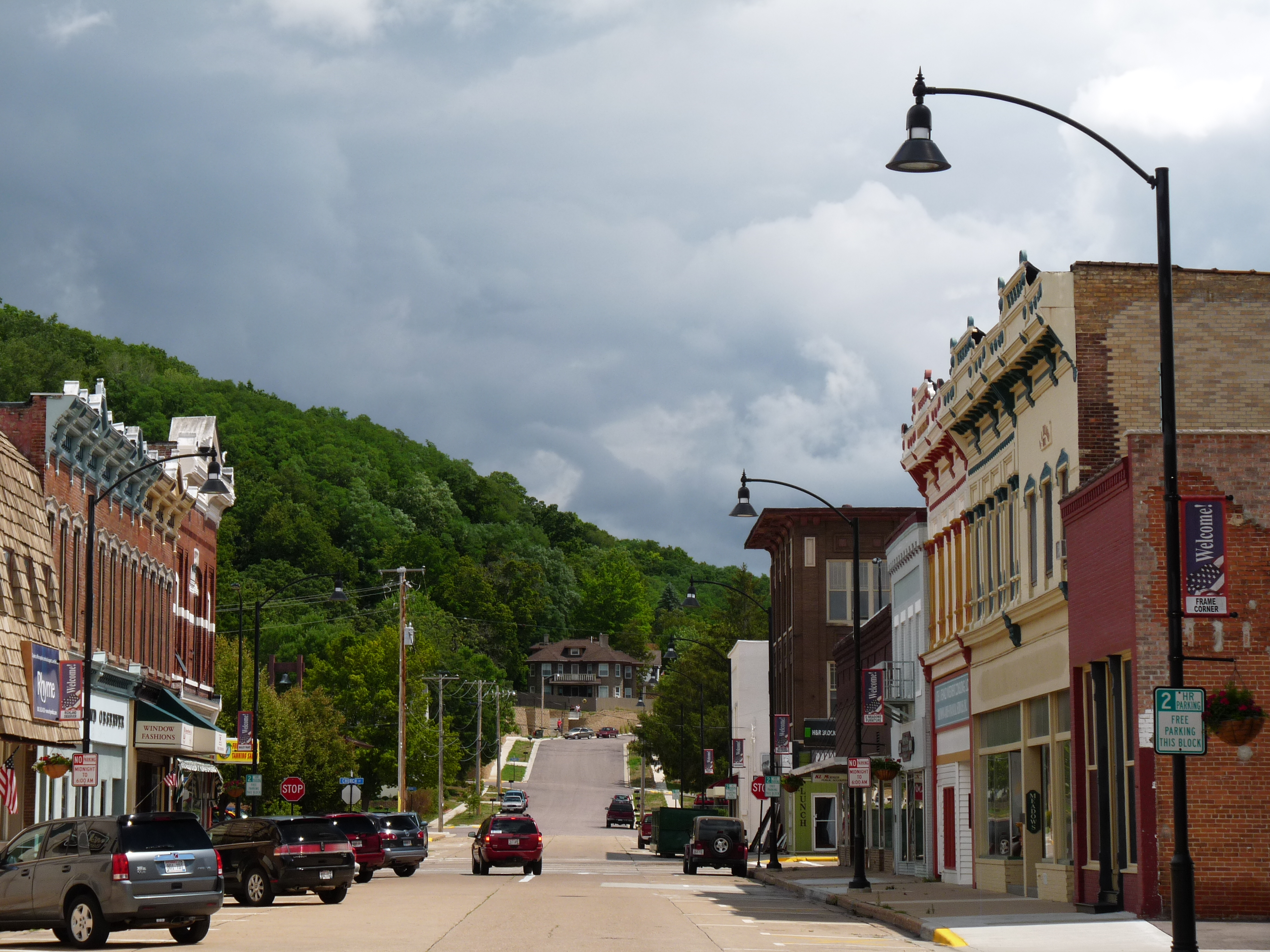
- A portion of the district

- Location within Wisconsin Location within the United States
- Location: Roughly bounded by Mill, Church, Haseltine, and Main Sts., Richland Center, Wisconsin
- Coordinates: 43.336°N 90.385°W
- Area: 11.2 acres (4.5 ha)
- Architect: Multiple
- Architectural style: Late 19th And 20th Century Revivals, Late Victorian, Commercial Style
- NRHP reference No.: 89001955
- Added to NRHP: November 13, 1989

The Court Street Commercial Historic District is a largely intact part of the old downtown of Richland Center, Wisconsin. It was added to the National Register of Historic Places in 1989 - a 11.2 acres (4.5 ha) historic district which included 51 contributing buildings and 20 non-contributing ones. The buildings are commercial, mostly in Late Victorian styles constructed from 1870 to 1938. Most are brick two-story buildings; a few one-story and three-story brick buildings are interspersed.

In 1850 Vermont-born Ira S. Haseltine bought 160 acres along the Pine River and platted a town of Richland Center. A year or two later he got it chosen as the county seat. By 1854 Haseltine had built a dam on the river which powered a sawmill and gristmill, and around this industry a little commercial center had taken shape, with a hotel, a post office, three stores, a blacksmith, and eight homes. By 1858 a newspaper was added, "a hardware store, a wagon shop, a cobbler, and brick yard, a baker, a jewelry store, a cabinet shop, and several tanneries and asheries." Most of this development was near the river, to the west of the current historic district.

The town grew slowly until the mid-1870s due to lack of good transportation. In 1856 the Milwaukee and Mississippi Railroad had built its line along the Wisconsin River valley to the south, bypassing Richland Center, and refused to build a spur up to the town. In the early 1870s the town finally built its own spur 16 miles down the Pine River valley to Lone Rock - 16 miles of wooden narrow-gauge track. With that connection to the outside world completed in 1876, the town began growing faster, with the downtown expanding east into what is now the historic district.

The surrounding farms transitioned from growing wheat to dairy, with Richland Center providing supplies, services and connection to markets for the surrounding countryside. Butter production moved from the farms into town in the 1880s. Banks opened in 1870, 1881 and 1891. Wholesalers in town traded in cheese, groceries, fruits, tobacco, lumber, produce, livestock, poultry, eggs, wool and feed. The city was chartered in 1887, soon providing lighting, fire protection, and public water.

Many of the buildings still standing along Court Street were built in the late 1800s and early 1900s. Many of their storefronts at street level have been remodeled, but the upper stories are largely as originally built, with brick detail and elaborate cornices intact. Following are some examples, roughly in the order built.

- The Park Hotel at 213 S. Central Ave was built of wood in 1873, then veneered with brick in 1900, then expanded in 1926 and 1930. It is three stories, with a square tower on the north end and an octagonal tower on the south. The round arches suggest Romanesque Revival style; the mansard roof on the one tower is from Second Empire style. Now apartments.
- The 1883 H.T. Bailey Store and Opera House at 194 E. Court St. is a large 2-story Italianate-styled building with white stone trim and a bracketed cornice topped with a triangular pediment. It was designed by David Jones of Madison and built of brick from the local Hyatt Brickyard. Bailey initially ran a dry goods store at street level, with storage and a public meeting hall above. In addition to his retail business, Bailey bought wool and pork, but his store didn't make the transition from an exchange system to a credit system, and he went bankrupt in 1899. The meeting hall hosted dances, concerts, minstrel shows, plays, speeches, church events, meetings of the Modern Woodmen, and in 1886 a speech by Susan B. Anthony.
- The 1883 A.A. Bulard Jewelry Store at 155b E Court St. is a 2-story Italianate-influenced brick building with a projecting, bracketed metal cornice. It originally housed a jewelry store, but in 1906 Pratt Brothers bought it for their furniture store.
- The 1885-1892 A.A. Bulard building at 155a E Court St. is another 2-story structure very much like Bulard's building next door at 155b, but the windows on the second story are different, with iron pilasters flanking four recessed windows. It too later became part of Pratt Brothers furniture store.
- The 1889 O.J. Burnham Building at 159 E. Court St. is yet another 2-story structure matching the adjacent Bulard buildings. It housed a produce store until the 1970s.
- The 1889 D.G. James Building at 172 E. Court St. is a 2-story Italianate-influenced building with brackets and modillions supporting a projecting metal cornice. Initially it housed James' harness shop and a bank; later the Richland Observer newspaper office.
- The 1889-92 Burnham and Burnham Drug Store at 182 E. Court St. is a 2-story building matched to the James building next door. Iron columns flank the front door. It housed a drug store until 1962.
- Hartz Building-Mehaffey's Saloon at 131 W. Court St. is a 2-story building built in the late 1880s, cream brick walls ornamented with red brick in the arches above the windows and the cornice. It housed Mehaffey's "upper class" saloon starting in 1892; later a clothing store.
- The 1889 Richland County Courthouse at 179a West Seminary St. sits in its own block separate from the business district. It was designed by J.D. Allen of Madison, with classic Richardsonian Romanesque style in its asymmetry, round arches, and the rough stonework in the lower half. Its red brick came from the local Mininski Brickyard.
- The 1892 Union Block at 100-124 N. Main St. is a 2-story building with walls, pilasters, cornice and parapet all built from brick. It was built as an investment by W.H. Pier and Laura McCarthy, and by 1899 housed a dry goods and clothing store. The Grand Army of the Republic met in the building from 1894 to 1906. T.H. Costello ran a meat market there, Joseph Wolf a shoe store, and the Dieter Brothers a drug store. In 1911 the Dieter Brothers expanded their northern third of the building with an addition to the north in a similar style.
- The 1892 Pier Building and Opera House is an eclectic 2-story brick building with brick pilasters, cornice, and pediment-shaped moldings above the windows. It housed the Coffland Brothers Mercantile Company from 1892 to 1928.
- The 1895 Barnes and Toms Jewelry Store at 155c E Court St. is a 1-story brick building with a wooden store-front with cast iron columns flanking the door, and with brick and a small cornice above. It housed Toms Jewelry store until 1945, and later became part of C. Meadows Furniture Store.
- The 1904 Richland County Sheriff's Office and Jail at 179b West Seminary Street is a Romanesque Revival design by Andrew Lew Porter, red brick with a hipped roof and two corner towers, round with conical roofs.
- The 1911-12 W.H. Pier Building at 195 W. Court St. is a 2-story built of dark brown brick. The street level has been changed extensively, but the second story still shows the Classical Revival/Beaux Arts influence. The building initially housed the post office, and was remodeled as a bank in 1921.

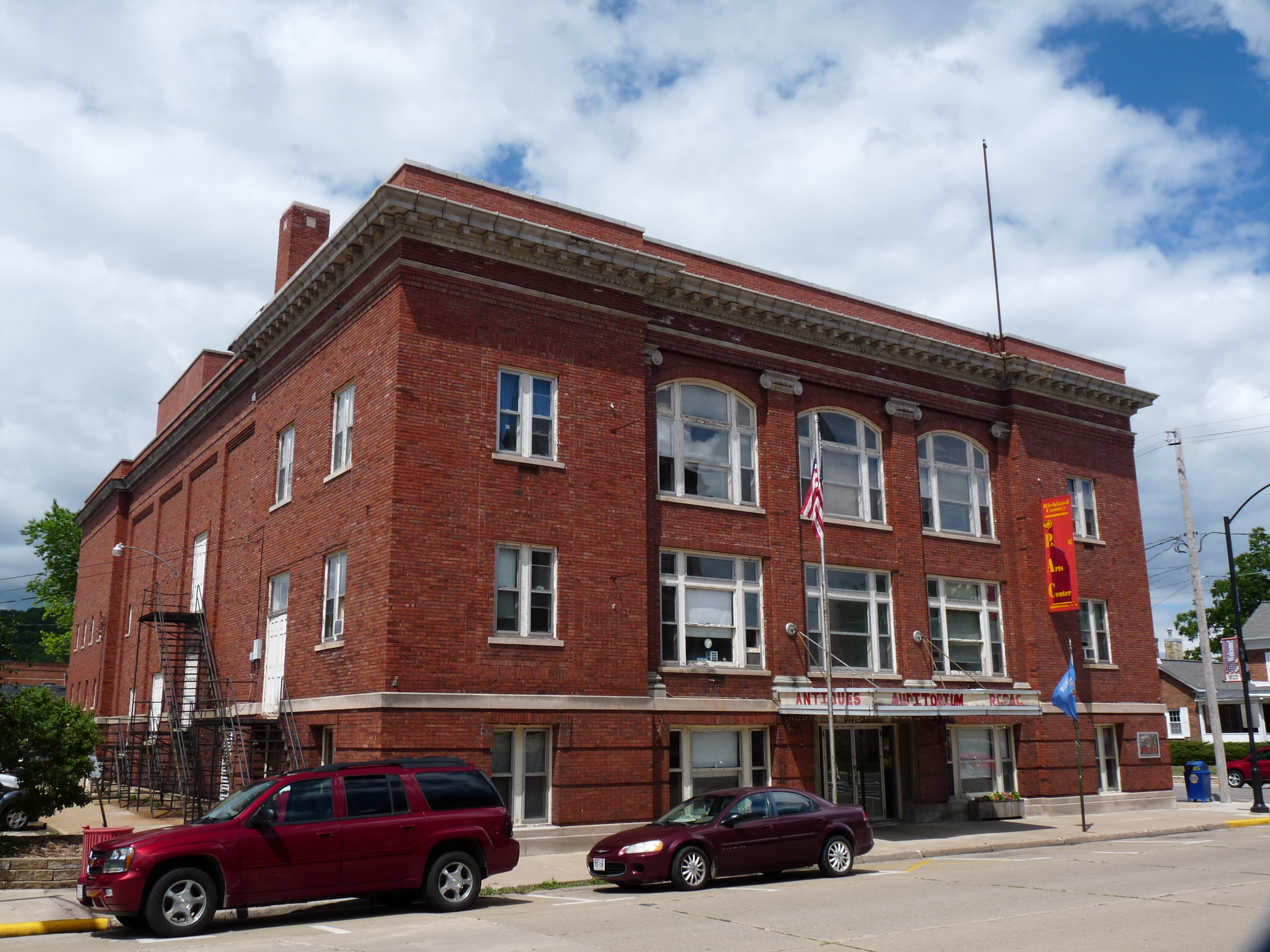
City Auditorium

- The 1911-12 Richland Center City Auditorium at 812 N. Central Ave is a 3-story municipal building designed by Percy Bentley of La Crosse. Before its construction, Wisconsin municipalities were forbade to operate income-generating properties, but the Federated Women's League, including the Richland Center chapter, lobbied the State Legislature to revoke that statute. With that statute gone, the local women spurred the city, and Richland Center was the first city in Wisconsin to take advantage of the rule change. Offices of city officials are in the front of the building, the basement holds a women's club room, the third floor holds meeting rooms and a rec room, and the rest of the building holds a 900-seat auditorium. In the first year, the auditorium hosted 51 events, from which the city made $2000.
- The 1912-13 Edwards Block at 101 S. Church St. is a 3-story building with the window bands of 20th Century Commercial-style. It initially housed a clothes store and the McNitt Business School.
- The 1920 Masonic Temple at 189 N. Central Ave. is a well-preserved 3-story meeting hall designed by Edward Tough in Beaux Arts style.
- The 1920 First National Bank at 108 E. Court St. is a Neoclassical-styled building with colossal Ionic columns and pilasters, designed by A Moorman and Company.
- The 1927 Le Hew Filling Station at 208 S. Church St is a gas station built by Dell Beaty, with a steeply pitched roof that suggests Tudor Revival covered with tiles that suggest Mediterranean Revival.
- The 1928 Klinzing and Banker Plumbing Shop at 130 S. Main St. is a modest 2-story brown brick shop with a recessed facade with a full-length transom and plate glass windows. It still houses a plumbing business.
- The 1935 U.S. Post Office at 213 N. Central Ave. is red brick, Georgian Revival-styled. Inside is a Works Progress Administration mural (see accompanying photos #39 and #40) The mural, titled "The Post Unites America" was painted in 1937 by artist Richard Brooks.
