= Chiantla =

- Municipality
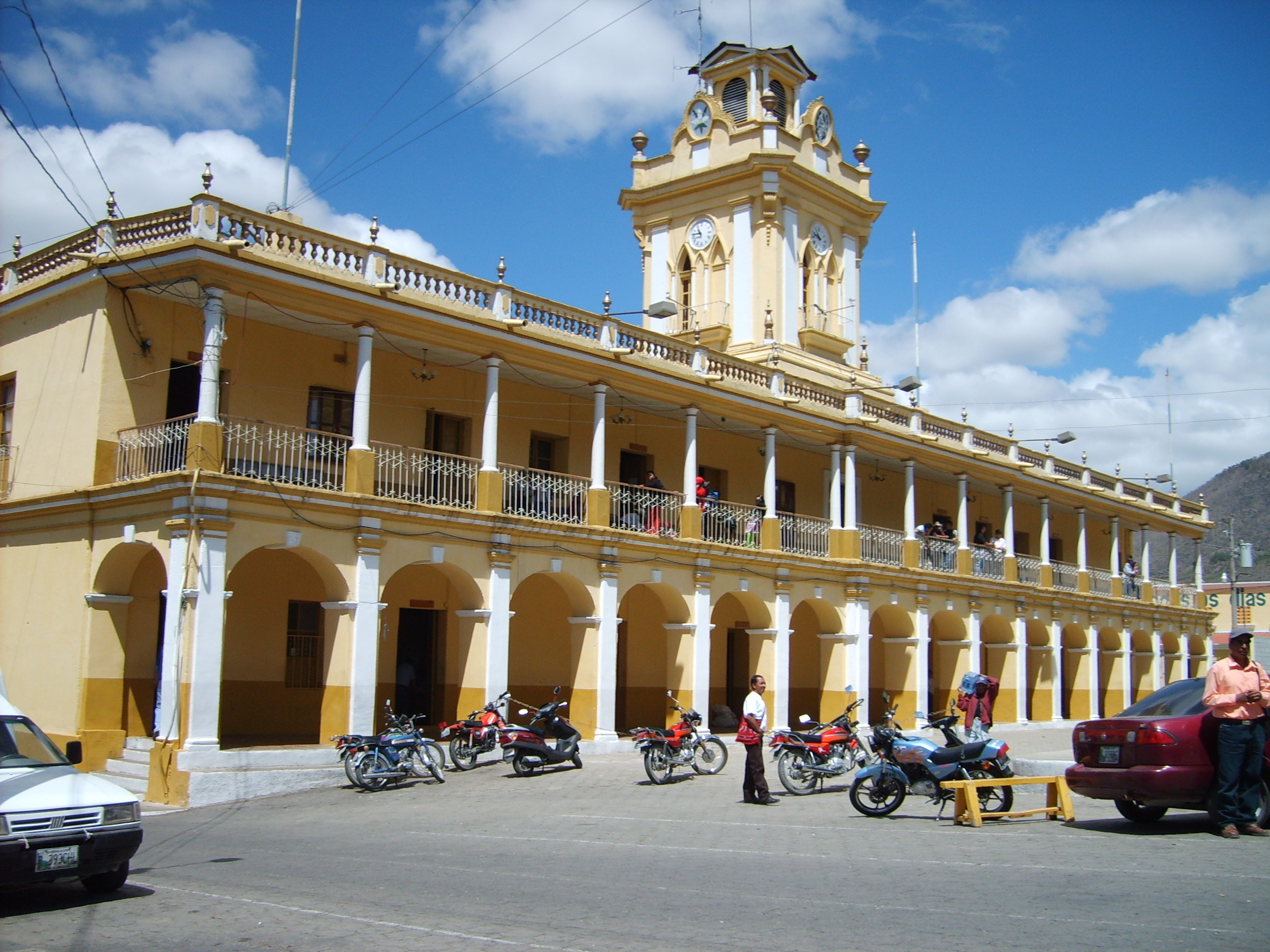
- Chiantla Municipal Palace

- Location in Guatemala
- Coordinates: 15°21′0″N 91°27′0″W
- Country: Guatemala
- Department: Huehuetenango
- Municipality: Chiantla

Government
  - Type: Municipal
  - Mayor: Carlos Armando Alvarado Figueroa (Unidad Nacional de la Esperanza)

Area
  - Municipality: 521 km^{2} (201 sq mi)
- Elevation: 2,000 m (6,600 ft)
- Highest elevation: 3,800 m (12,500 ft)
- Lowest elevation: 1,900 m (6,200 ft)

Population (2018 census)
  - Municipality: 87,447
  - Density: 168/km^{2} (435/sq mi)
  - Urban: 7,208
  - Ethnicities: Ladino Mam
  - Religions: Roman Catholicism Evangelicalism Maya
- Climate: Cwb
- Website: http://www.inforpressca.com/chiantla/

Chiantla (Spanish pronunciation: [ˈtʃjantla]) is a town and municipality in the Guatemalan department of Huehuetenango. The municipality is situated at 2,000 metres above sea level and covers an area of 521 km^{2}. The annual festival is on January 28.

== History ==
=== Mercedarian doctrine ===
Mercedarian coat of arms.

After the Spanish conquest of Guatemala in the 1520s, the "Presentación de Guatemala" Mercedarian province was formed in 1565; originally, the order of the Blessed Virgin Mary of Mercy had gotten from bishop Francisco Marroquín several doctrines in the Sacatepéquez and Chimaltenango valleys, close to the capital Santiago de los Caballeros de Guatemala, but they traded those with the Order of Preachers friars in exchange for the doctrines those had in the Sierra de los Cuchumatanes area. During the first part of the 17th century they also had doctrine in four town close to the city of Santiago, which eventually became city neighborhoods: Espíritu Santo, Santiago, San Jerónimo and San Anton —which was the capital of the Mercedarians, where they had their convent and where their comendador lived.

According to bishop Juan de las Cabezas memoir in 1613 and the bishop Pedro Cortés y Larraz parish visit minutes from 1770, the Mercedarians came to have nine doctrines, and numerous annexes, which were: Santa Ana de Malacatán, Concepción de Huehuetenango, San Pedro de Solomá, Nuestra Señora de la Purificación de Jacaltenango, Nuestra Señora de la Candelaria de Chiantla, San Andrés de Cuilco, Santiago de Tejutla, San Pedro de Sacatepéquez, and San Juan de Ostuncalco.

However, in 1754, due to the borbon reforms implemented by the Spanish kings, the Mercedarins -and the rest of the regular clergy for that matter-, had to transfer their doctrines to the secular clergy, thus losing their Chiantla convent and annexed doctrines.

== Climate ==
At an altitude of approximately 2000m, Chiantla has a climate similar to that of Antigua, though with the extra 600m above sea level it is often a little chillier in the night. The rainy season is from May to October, with mornings starting out warm and humid, followed by heavy rains - and even hail - in the afternoons, which usually dissipate by evening.

== Population ==
The inhabitants of the city are mostly ladino, it is common to hear the languages of Popti, Canjobal, Chuj, and Mam being spoken by street venders, shoppers and residents.

== Economy ==
=== Mining ===
Lead production was noted in the area in 1850. Modern exploration of the Chiantla mining district by Firestone Ventures, a Canadian firm headquartered in Edmonton, has produced a promising prospect for a lead, zinc, silver open pit mine at its Torlon Hill Zinc-Lead-Silver Project west of Chiantla at the site of the Cinco Hermanos workings.

- Photos of the Torlon HIll Zinc project

== Climate ==
Chiantla has a subtropical highland climate (Köppen: Cwb).

Climate data for Chiantla
Month	Jan	Feb	Mar	Apr	May	Jun	Jul	Aug	Sep	Oct	Nov	Dec	Year
Mean daily maximum °C (°F)	21.3 (70.3)	22.5 (72.5)	24.7 (76.5)	25.2 (77.4)	24.4 (75.9)	23.0 (73.4)	22.7 (72.9)	23.2 (73.8)	22.8 (73.0)	21.9 (71.4)	21.7 (71.1)	21.2 (70.2)	22.9 (73.2)
Daily mean °C (°F)	14.6 (58.3)	15.3 (59.5)	17.3 (63.1)	18.1 (64.6)	18.2 (64.8)	17.7 (63.9)	17.2 (63.0)	17.1 (62.8)	17.2 (63.0)	16.5 (61.7)	15.5 (59.9)	14.8 (58.6)	16.6 (61.9)
Mean daily minimum °C (°F)	7.9 (46.2)	8.1 (46.6)	9.9 (49.8)	11.0 (51.8)	12.1 (53.8)	12.4 (54.3)	11.7 (53.1)	11.1 (52.0)	11.6 (52.9)	11.1 (52.0)	9.4 (48.9)	8.5 (47.3)	10.4 (50.7)
Average precipitation mm (inches)	11 (0.4)	11 (0.4)	24 (0.9)	47 (1.9)	112 (4.4)	224 (8.8)	140 (5.5)	139 (5.5)	203 (8.0)	150 (5.9)	38 (1.5)	11 (0.4)	1,110 (43.6)
Source: Climate-Data.org

== Geographic location ==
Chiantla is almost completely surrounded by Huehuetenango Department municipalities. The city of Chiantla is located within the Northwest sector of the department of Huehuetenango. It sits in the mountainside above the city of Huehuetenango, approximately 2 hours from the Mexican border.

== See also ==
- List of places in Guatemala

== Notes and references ==
=== Bibliography ===
- Cortés y Larraz, Pedro (2001) [1770]. García, Jesús María; Blasco, Julio Martín (eds.). Descripción Geográfico-Moral de la Diócesis de Goathemala. Corpus Hispanorum de Pace. Segunda Serie (in Spanish). Consejo Superior de Investigaciones Científicas. ISBN 9788400080013. ISSN 0589-8056.
- Juarros, Domingo (1818). Compendio de la historia de la Ciudad de Guatemala (in Spanish). Guatemala: Ignacio Beteta.
- Pérez, Pedro Nolasco O. de M. (1966). Historia de las Misiones Mercedarias en América (in Spanish). Madrid.
