= Church of Santa Maria Madalena =

Church building in Braga, Portugal

Coordinates: 41.52211°N 8.3878°W

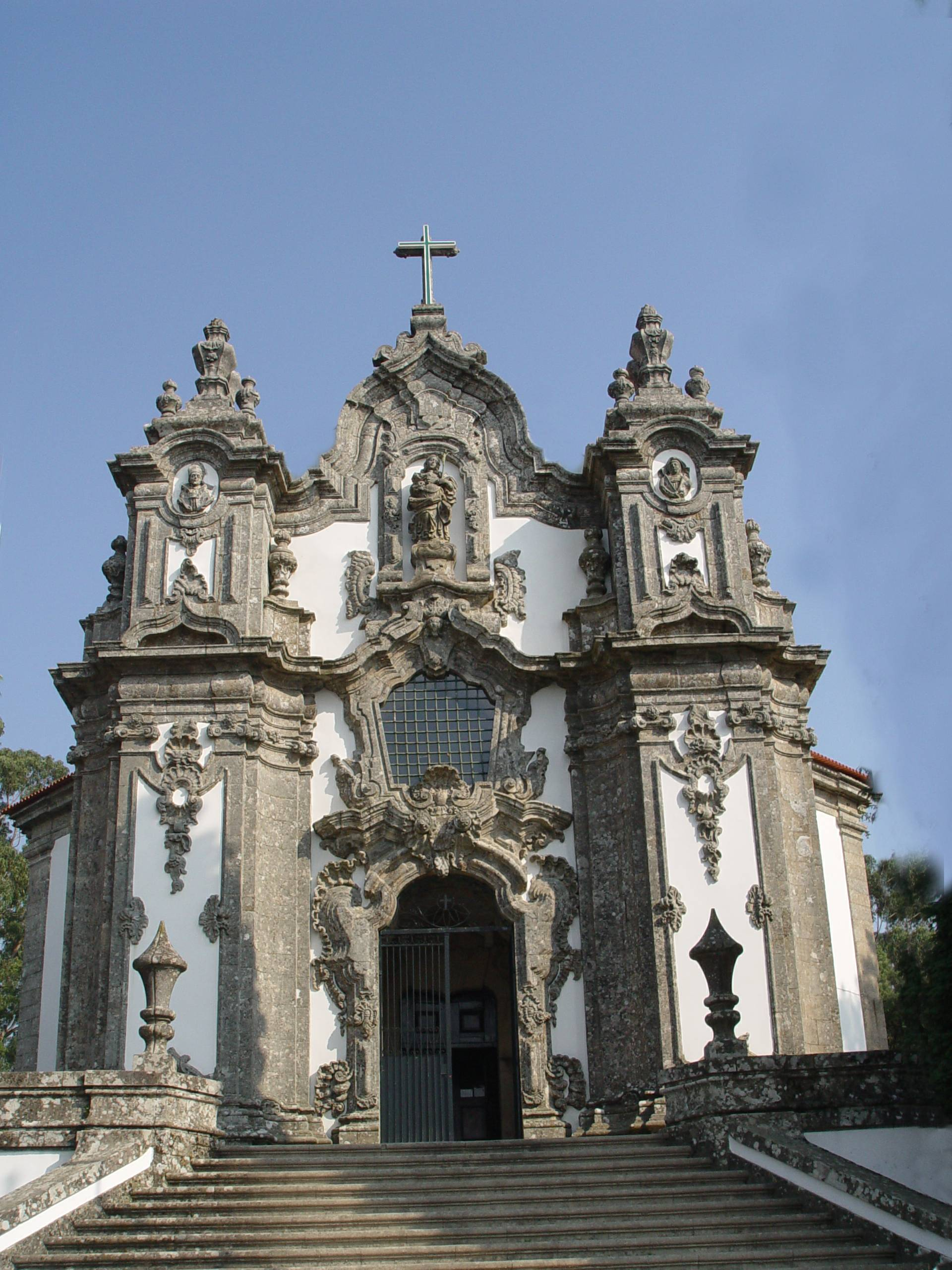
Main facade

The Church of Santa Maria Madalena, also known as Falperra Church, (Portuguese: Igreja da Falperra or Igreja de Santa Maria Madalena) is a Baroque church located in the Falperra Mountains (Serra da Falperra), right in the border between the parishes of Longos (Guimarães) and Nogueira, Fraião e Lamaçães (Braga).

== Description ==
The church was built in the early 18th century, by order of the Archbishop D. Rodrigo de Moura Teles. It was a project by the leading Portuguese sculptor and architect André Soares.

The granite retable-like frontage is exuberantly decorated. Particularly striking is the throne with Saint Mary Magdalene, flanked by two small towers bearing the busts of Saint Martha and Saint Lazarus.
