= Palacio Municipal de Zapopan =

Building in Zapopan, Jalisco, Mexico

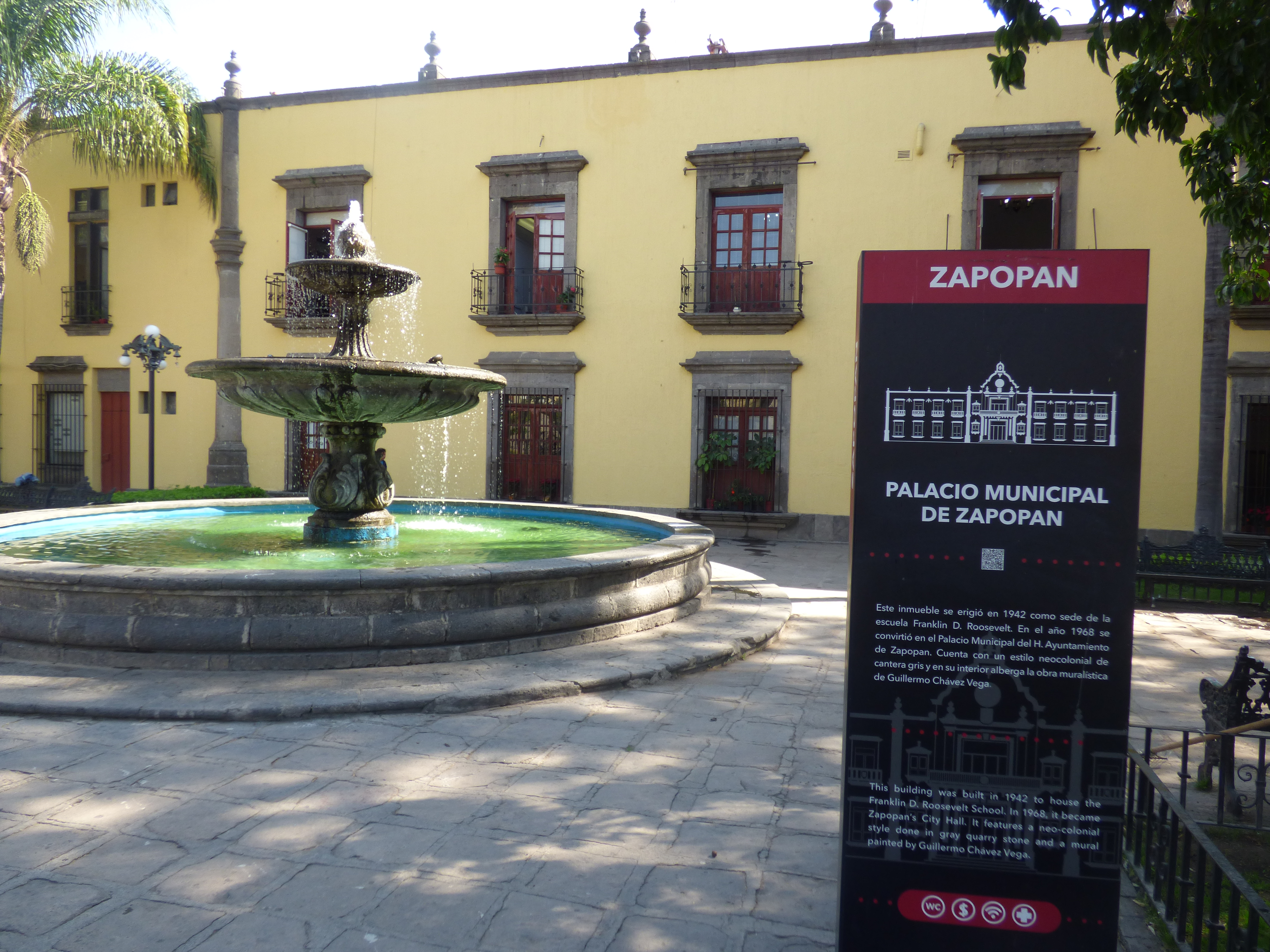

- Location within Mexico

General information
- Location: Zapopan, Jalisco, Mexico
- Coordinates: 20.7218°N 103.3899°W

Palacio Municipal de Zapopan is a historic building in Zapopan, in the Mexican state of Jalisco.
