= André Soares (architect) =

Portuguese sculptor and architect

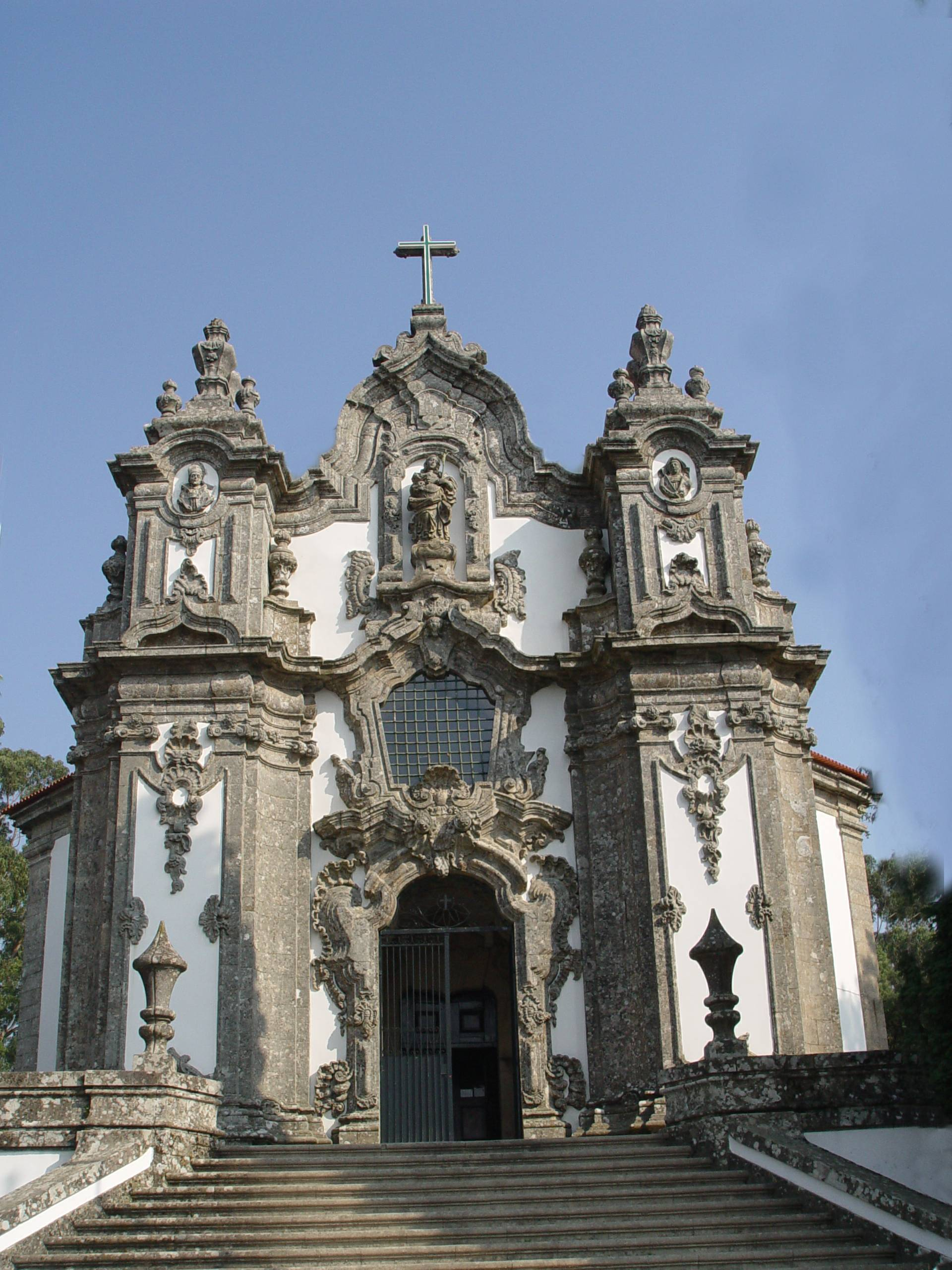
Main façade of the Falperra Church, a project by André Soares.

André Soares Ribeiro da Silva, more commonly known as André Soares (30 November 1720 – 26 November 1769) was a leading Portuguese sculptor and architect active in Northern Portugal during the 18th century.

Born in Braga, most of his work is found in and around this city. As a sculptor, he was responsible for designing the gilt woodwork (talha dourada) altarpieces of the Monastery of Tibães. Outside Braga, his work as an architect includes the audacious Falperra Church (with a heptagonal floorplan), the Santos Passos Church in Guimarães and the Church of Our Lady of Lapa in Arcos de Valdevez, while in Braga he designed the Braga Town Hall, the Palácio do Raio, the Congregados Church, the Arco da Porta Nova (City Gate) among many other structures.

The work of André Soares is characterised by the exuberant decoration and the use of Rococo forms influenced by contemporary Northern European art.
