= Raio Palace =

Palace of Raio
- Palácio do Raio
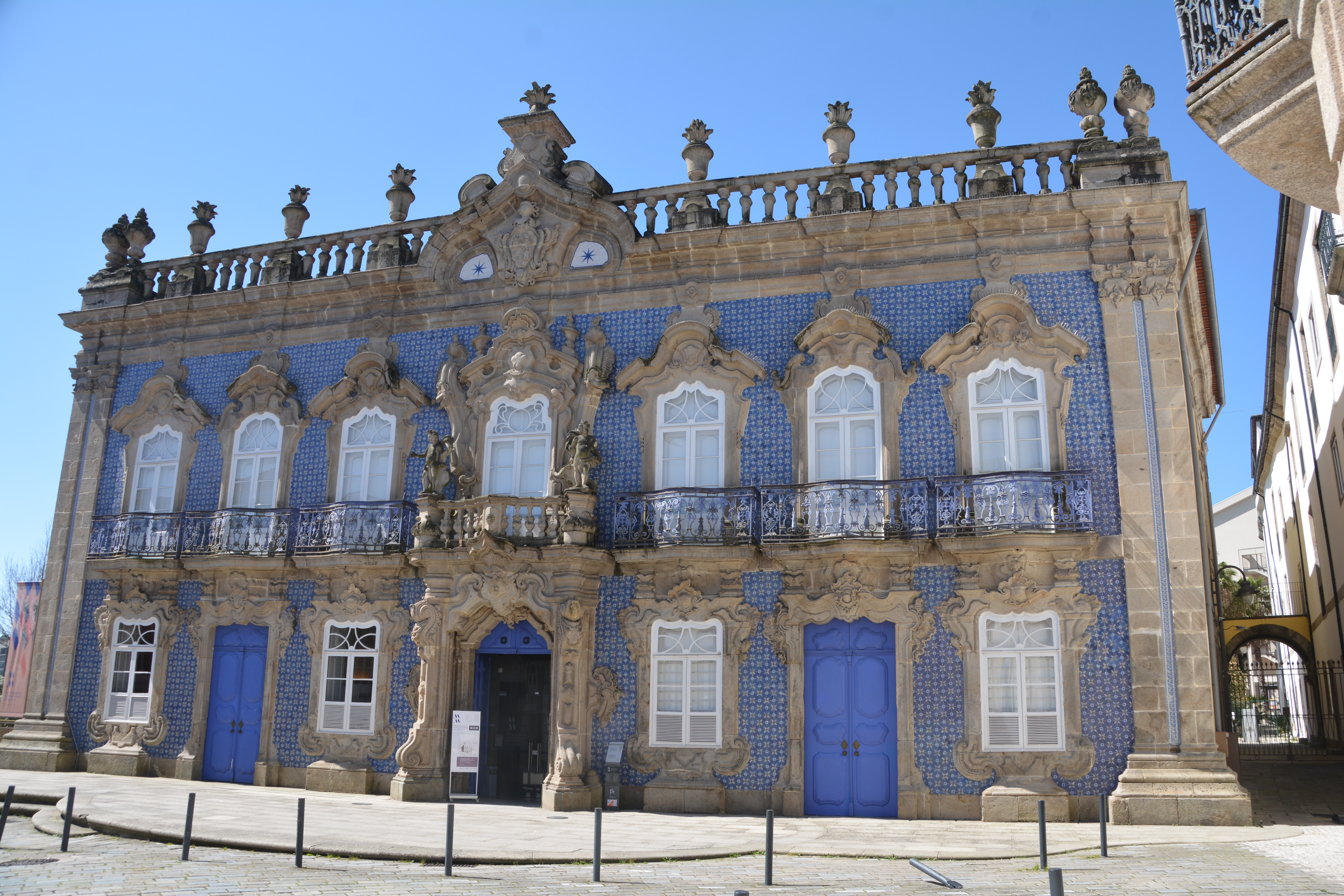
- The front facade of the Raio Palace, from Rua do Raio
- Interactive map of the Palace of Raio area

General information
- Type: Palace
- Architectural style: Baroque
- Location: São José de São Lázaro, Braga, Portugal
- Coordinates: 41°32′54.16″N 8°25′21.46″W
- Opening: c. 1754
- Owner: Portuguese Republic

Technical details
- Material: Granite from Braga and Gondizalves

Design and construction
- Architect: André Soares (architect)

The Palace of Raio (Portuguese: Palácio do Raio) is a Baroque era residence in the urbanized area of the municipality of Braga, in the civil parish of São José de São Lázaro. It is an example of the late Baroque, early Rococo style of decoration by Portuguese architect André Soares, notable for his influence in the northern Baroque movement.

== History ==
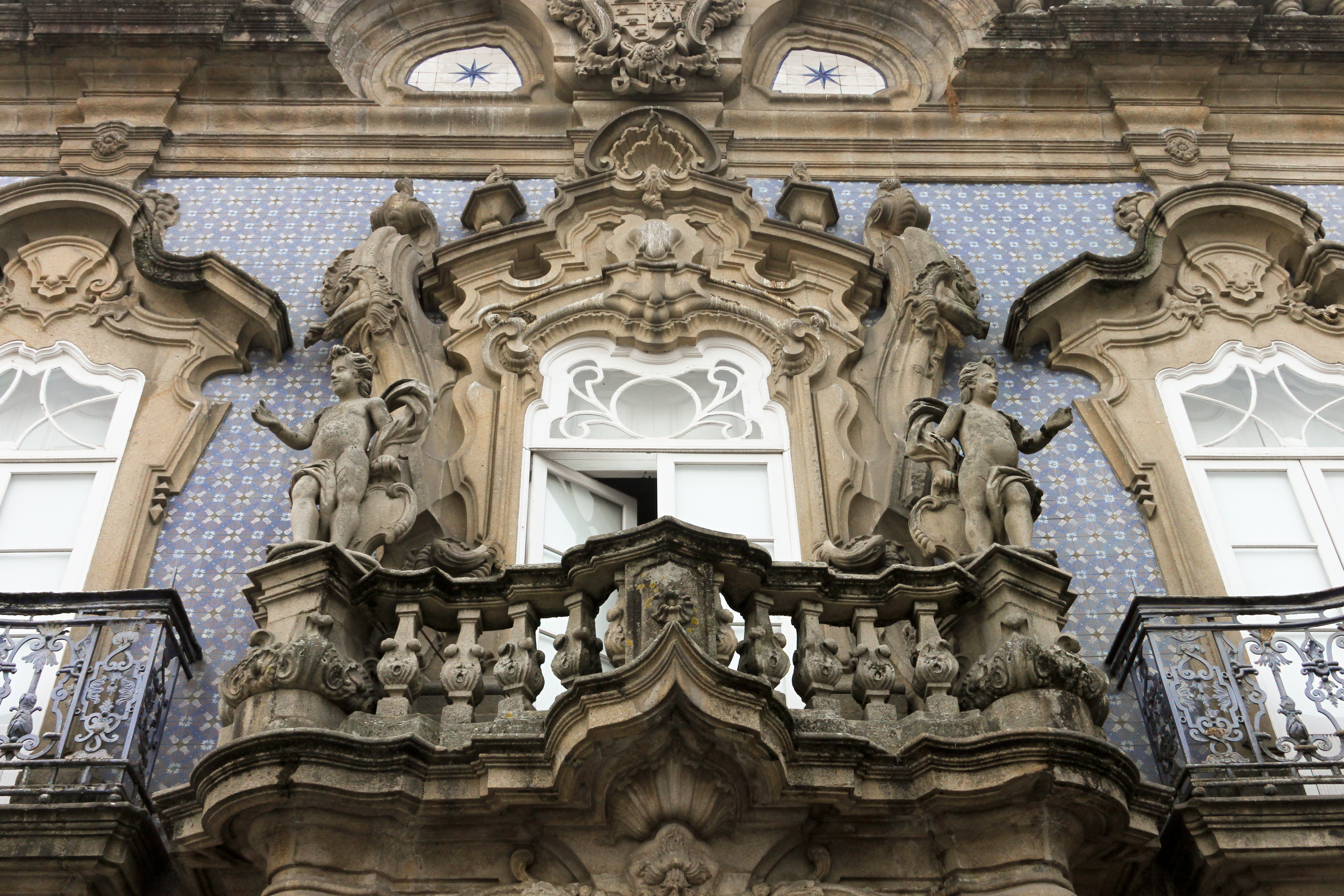
The second-floor balcony with ornate decoration and monolithic lintel, and flanking sculptures

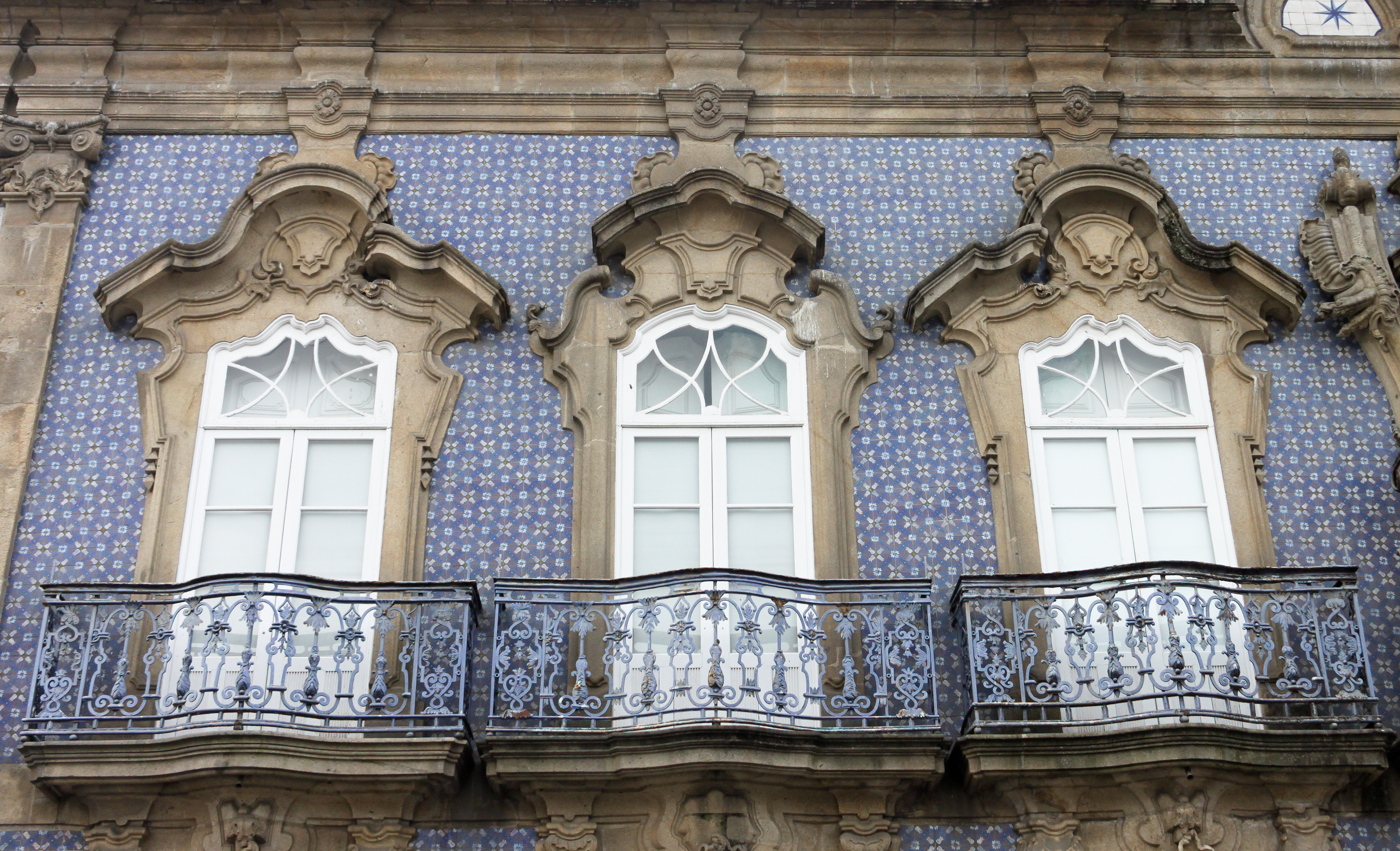
Examples of the flanking windows on the second-floor, less ornate than the central block

The construction of the Palace of Raio was ordered by João Duarte de Faria, a knight of the Military Order of Christ, who was a rich merchant.

The commission was given to André Soares in 1754–1755, an architect already famous in the Braga region for his artistic and engineering projects. Soares reformulated the style first introduced to Porto by Nasoni, basing his interpretations on French-German sketches, "one of the expressions more distinct and powerful of the European Rococo". His work is characterized by the monumental nature of its forms, and for his use of natural elements in the decorative sculptures that permeate the design, including the shells, jars, wreaths and garlands. These elements show the influence of the Augsburg sketches, or the Frenchman Meissonier, among others. In the context of Portuguese art, André Soares was part of the end of the Baroque period, and beginning of the Rococo; his style used the structure of the Baroque, but the decorative style of the Rococo. André Soares had worked on the Sanctuary of Bom Jesus and the Church of Santa Maria Madalena da Falperra, and the Raio Palace is seen as an extension of the "festive character of Falperra".

In 1760, the staircase was painted.

A century later, the residence was acquired by Miguel José Raio, then Viscount of São Lázaro (in 1867), and over time, it became known as the Palace of Raio.

The Escola Profissional de Recuperação do Património de Sintra (Professional School for Recuperation of Sintra Patrimony) intervened in 1993 to repair the doors and windows on this first floor. The group was responsible for repairing the wood frames, cleaning of the stone from damage caused by humidity, completing moulds, installation of artificial stoneworks, reinforcing the structure with cement and reintegration of many of the sculptures. Matos Sequeira, an archeologist, once referred to the facade as similar to a piece of furniture from the court of King Louis XV.

== Architecture ==
The building is located in the urban context of Braga, situated alongside the Hospital of São Marcos and the pavilion sheltering the Fountain of the Idol.

It is a singular block, in the Baroque-style, constructed during the reign of King John V. The palace is a two-story building, consisting of three doors on the main floor flanked by ornate framed windows, and the second-floor consisting of several windows and balconies. The roof is topped by a veranda of balusters, with ornate vegetal pinnacles.

Deeply indented over the main portal is a balcony of balusters that is flanked by two decorative sculptures. The lintel over this second-floor balcony is monolithic. Its cornice, which is exceptionally recessed, and crowned by a balustrade consisting of six flaming sculptures, while four amphorae on its flanks over an Ionic pilasters frame.

The main floor is embellished by frames of carved granite and the outline of the wrought iron balconies. On either side of the main entrance are two lateral doorways—all of which are painted in complementary blue. While the facade is covered in azulejo tile, installed in the 19th century, the whole building is built from fine-grained granite. On the landing, the azulejos were likely designed by Bartolomeu Antunes, owing to the different interpretations of the Rococo: one more traditional from a workshop in Lisbon, and another which predominates a northern agitation, from Braga.

This residence is considered one of the most important public works of André Soares, presenting a facade that is profusely decorated, where the general symmetry contrasts with the asymmetries introduced by the windows. This is particularly true of the central section, which is similar to the models utilized in the Church of Falperra and Municipal Council building of Braga—all which have similar traits. The window over the main doorway connects a curved pediment that is reminiscent of the Church of Santa Maria Madalena, although it is highly projected from the rest of the facade. As Vitor Serrão mentions in his critique, it is across "the sensual and powerful sense of deconstruction that the openings almost announce the art of one Gaudi", and the building "imposes a newness and display, within a sensual Rococo rhythm to the noble staircase like an inviting exotic figure".

In the interior is the noble staircase, with three arches and sculpture of a Turk, comparable to the four statues in the esplanade of the Church of Bom Jesus, who Smith attributes to André Soares (even if they were executed by masons José and António de Sousa).

== See also ==
- List of Baroque residences

== Sources ==
- Almeida, José António Ferreira de (1976), Tesouros de Portugal (in Portuguese), Lisbon, Portugal
- Dionísio, Santana (1986), Guia de Portugal (in Portuguese), vol. 4, Coimbra, Portugal
- Escola Profissional de Recuperação do Património de Sintra, ed. (January 1993), Relatórios da intervenção no portal e janelas do primeiro piso da fachada principal (in Portuguese), vol. 4, Cacém, Portugal
- Aires-Barros, Luís (April 2001), As Rochas dos Monumentos Portugueses: tipologias e patologias (in Portuguese), vol. II, Lisbon, Portugal
- "Santa Casa da Misericórdia", Diário do Minho (in Portuguese), 28 October 2006, p. 2
- Smith, Robert C. (1973), André Soares, arquitecto do Minho [André Soares, Architect of Minho] (in Portuguese), Lisbon, Portugal
- Smith, Robert C. (1968), A Casa da Câmara de Braga (1753–1756)", Bracara Augusta (in Portuguese), Braga, Portugal
- Pereira, José Fermandes (1995), "O barroco do século XVIII", História da Arte Portuguesa (in Portuguese), vol. 3, Lisbon, Portugal
- Serrão, Vitor (2003), O Barroco (in Portuguese), Lisbon, Portugal
