= Chiantla Municipal Palace =

- Palacio Municipal de la Villa de Chiantla
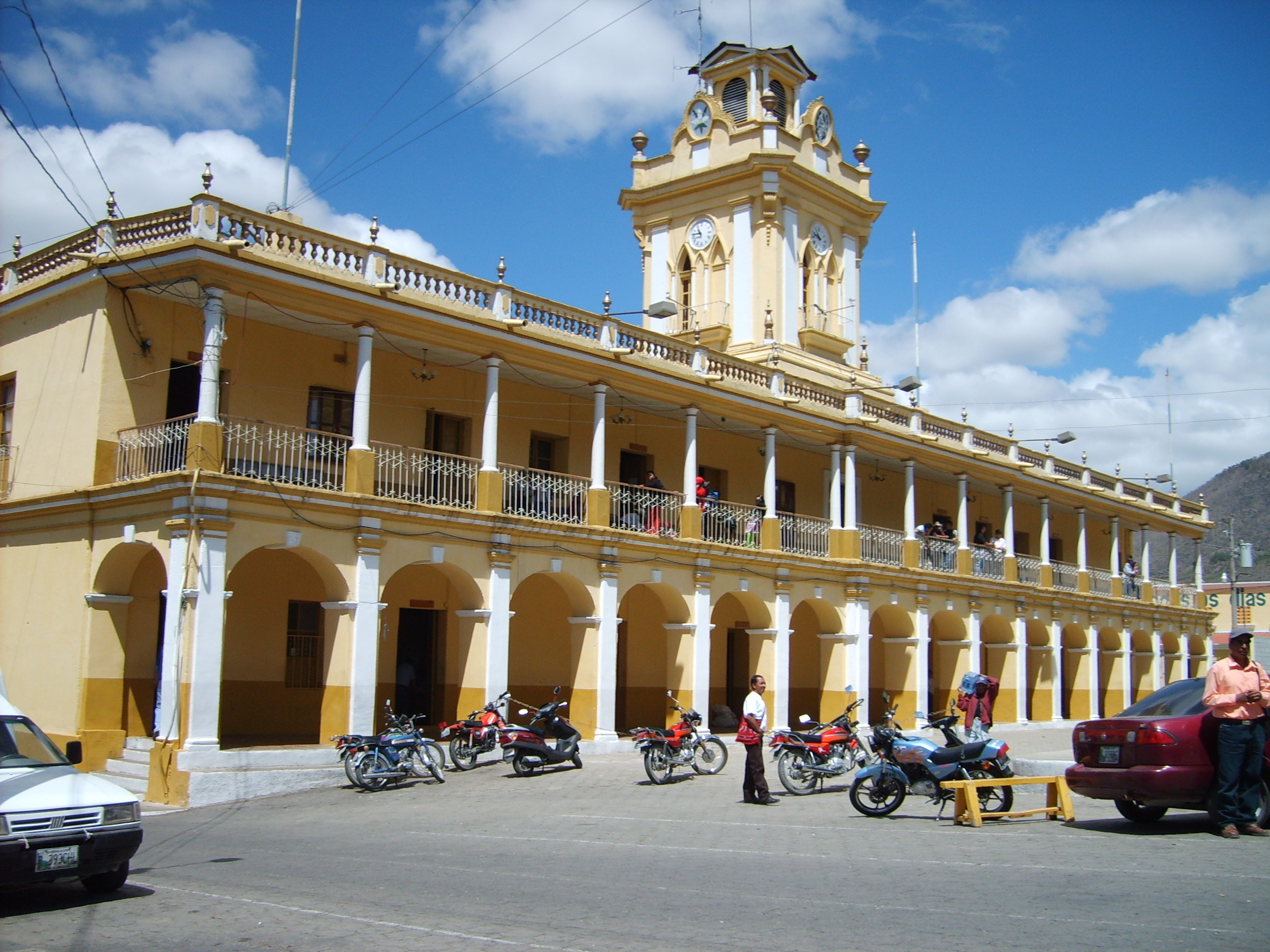
- The Chiantla Municipal Palace

General information
- Type: Government building
- Location: Chiantla, Huehuetenango Department, Guatemala, 4th Avenue, between 6th and 7th Street, Zone 1
- Coordinates: 15.35496°N 91.45845°W
- Construction started: 1882
- Completed: 1886–1887

Technical details
- Material: Calicanto (lime-and-rubble masonry)

The Chiantla Municipal Palace (Palacio Municipal de la Villa de Chiantla) is the municipal government building of Chiantla, a town and municipality in the Huehuetenango Department of Guatemala. Built in the 1880s, it remains the seat of the municipal government and is regarded locally as one of Chiantla's most significant architectural landmarks, second only to the town's colonial-era parish church.

== Location ==
The palace stands on 4th Avenue, between 6th and 7th Street, Zone 1, in the town centre of Chiantla, facing the Parque "La Juventud". Chiantla itself lies roughly 7 km from Huehuetenango, the departmental capital, at an elevation of about 2,000 metres in the foothills of the Sierra de los Cuchumatanes.

== Construction ==
Local histories date construction of the palace and its clock tower to 1882–1886, during the presidential administration of General Justo Rufino Barrios. The master mason in overall charge of the project is named as J. Ramón Sambrano.

The completed building measures approximately 44.48 by 19 metres and is built of calicanto, a traditional lime-and-rubble masonry common in Guatemalan civic architecture of the period. It has double arcade and a clock tower topped by a four-faced clock.

=== Political context ===
Cano Mérida's local history states that Chiantla contributed resources and fighters to Barrios during Guatemala's 1871 Liberal Revolution, and that the palace's construction is often cited locally as one of the era's defining civic monuments as a result.

== The tower clock ==
The palace's tower clock was inaugurated on 10 May 1884, before the rest of the building was complete. It was installed by a clockmaker named Emilio Ordóñez For much of the 20th century the clock was maintained by a single dedicated keeper, Blas Rubén Rodríguez Tello, who cared for it for 50 years.

== The surrounding plaza ==
The open space in front of the palace was originally known as "El Jardín" before later being renamed Parque "La Juventud". A centuries-old calicanto fountain stood in the plaza facing the palace until 1912, when it was replaced by piped drinking water. The old fountain was demolished in 1942 to make way for the Parque Central, which had been built in 1940–1941 and formally inaugurated on 30 June 1941.

== Use of the building ==
The palace's ground floor housed the Municipal Library from its founding in 1945. A local radio station, Radio 100.3 FM "Chiantla Estéreo", began broadcasting from the second floor on 31 July 2005.

== 1982 fire ==
In the early hours of 4 February 1982, during the internal armed conflict in Guatemala, the building was partially destroyed by fire. According to this account, guerrilla fighters attacked the police station housed on the ground floor, killing two police officers, before setting the lower floor alight; the fire spread through the wooden second floor, gutting the police station, an office of the health agency DIGESA, the Municipal Library, and the Treasury office.
