= Congregados Basilica =

Church in Braga, Portugal

Coordinates: 41.551175°N 8.421358°W

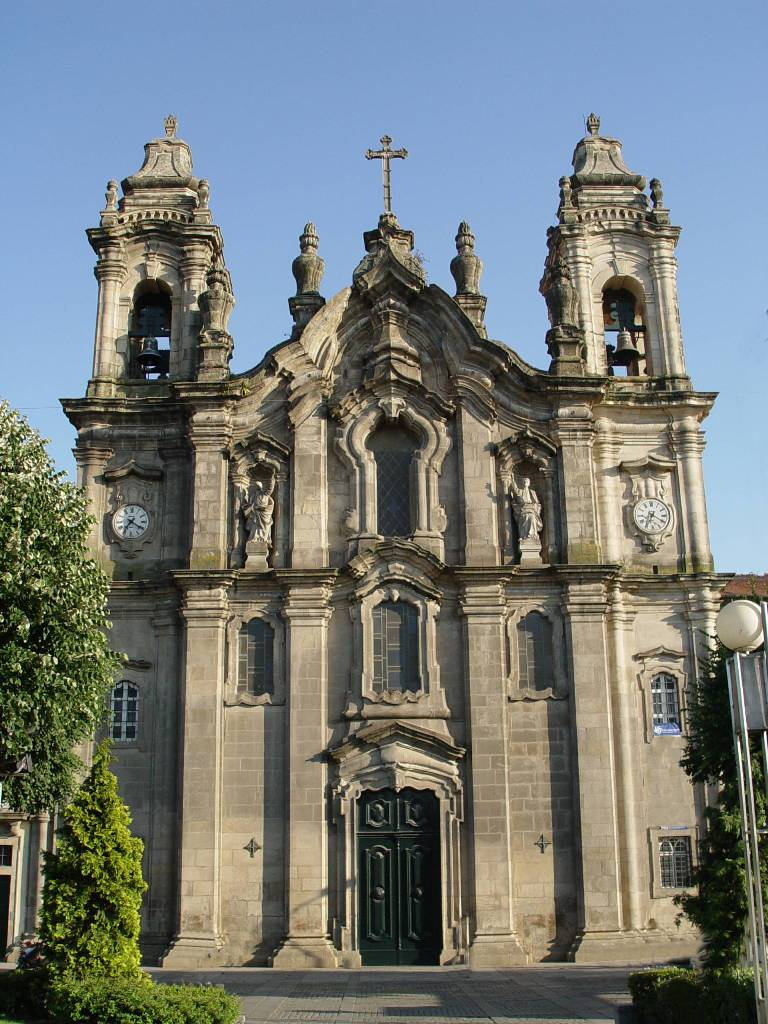
Congregados Church-Braga

The Congregados Basilica in Portuguese, Basílica dos Congregados is a Portuguese 18th-century baroque Basilica in Braga, Portugal.

The church, a project from the architect André Soares, is flanked on the top by two bell towers, one of which was finished in the 1960s.

== Gallery ==
Main façade and twin bell towers

View from the nave toward the high altar

High altar

Side chapels and pulpit
