= Monastery of São Martinho de Tibães =

Coordinates: 41.5559°N 8.4788°W

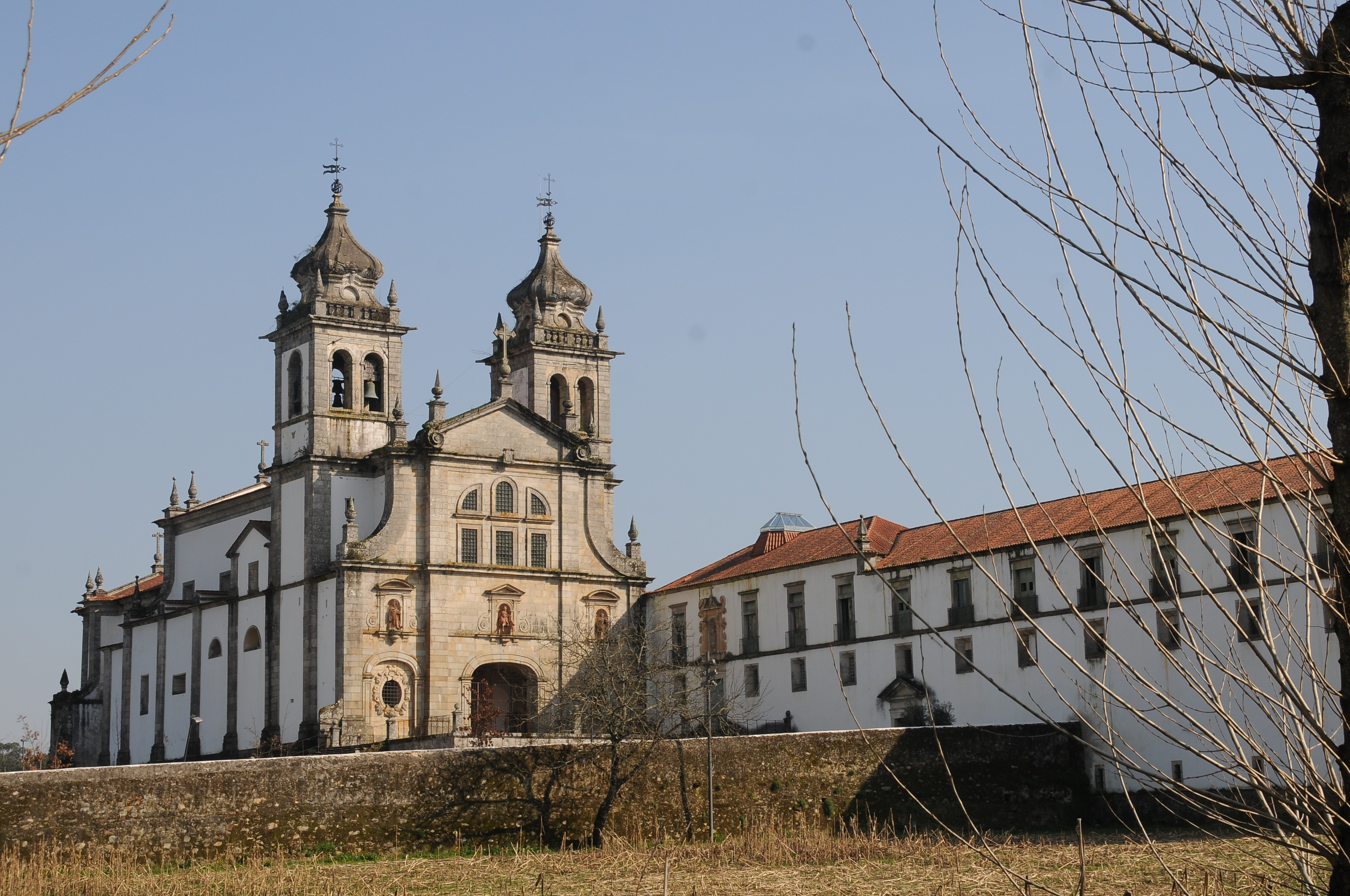
View of the Monastery of Tibães showing the church façade.

The Monastery of St Martin of Tibães (Portuguese: Mosteiro de São Martinho de Tibães) is a monastery in the parish of Mire de Tibães near Braga in northern Portugal. It was the mother house of the Benedictine order in Portugal and Brazil, and it is known for its church's exuberant Rococo interior.

== History ==
The first information about a monastic community in the regio—the Monastery of Dumio, close to Tibães, founded by Saint Martin of Braga—dates from the 6th century.

The Monastery of Tibães was founded around 1060, and its feudal rights were granted by Henry of Burgundy, Count of Portugal, in 1110. During the Middle Ages, after the Kingdom of Portugal became independent, rich and vast properties in the North of the country came into the Monastery's possession. However, due to the extensive reconstruction work carried out in the 17th and 18th centuries, there are no architectural remnants from this early period.

In 1567, the monastery became the mother house of the Order of Saint Benedict for Portugal and the colony of Brazil, with the first general gathering of the Order in Tibães in 1570. In the first half of the 17th century, with the ruined condition of the old monastery and the vast resources at their disposal, the monks began the radical rebuilding that gave origin to the ensemble that exists today. The works began with the refectory and cemetery cloisters and the church, which was built between 1628 and 1661 in Mannerist style by architects Manuel Álvares and João Turriano. By the beginning of the 18th century the monastery's new wings were finished, including the Gate House, the Dormitory, the Guest House, the Chapter House and the Library.

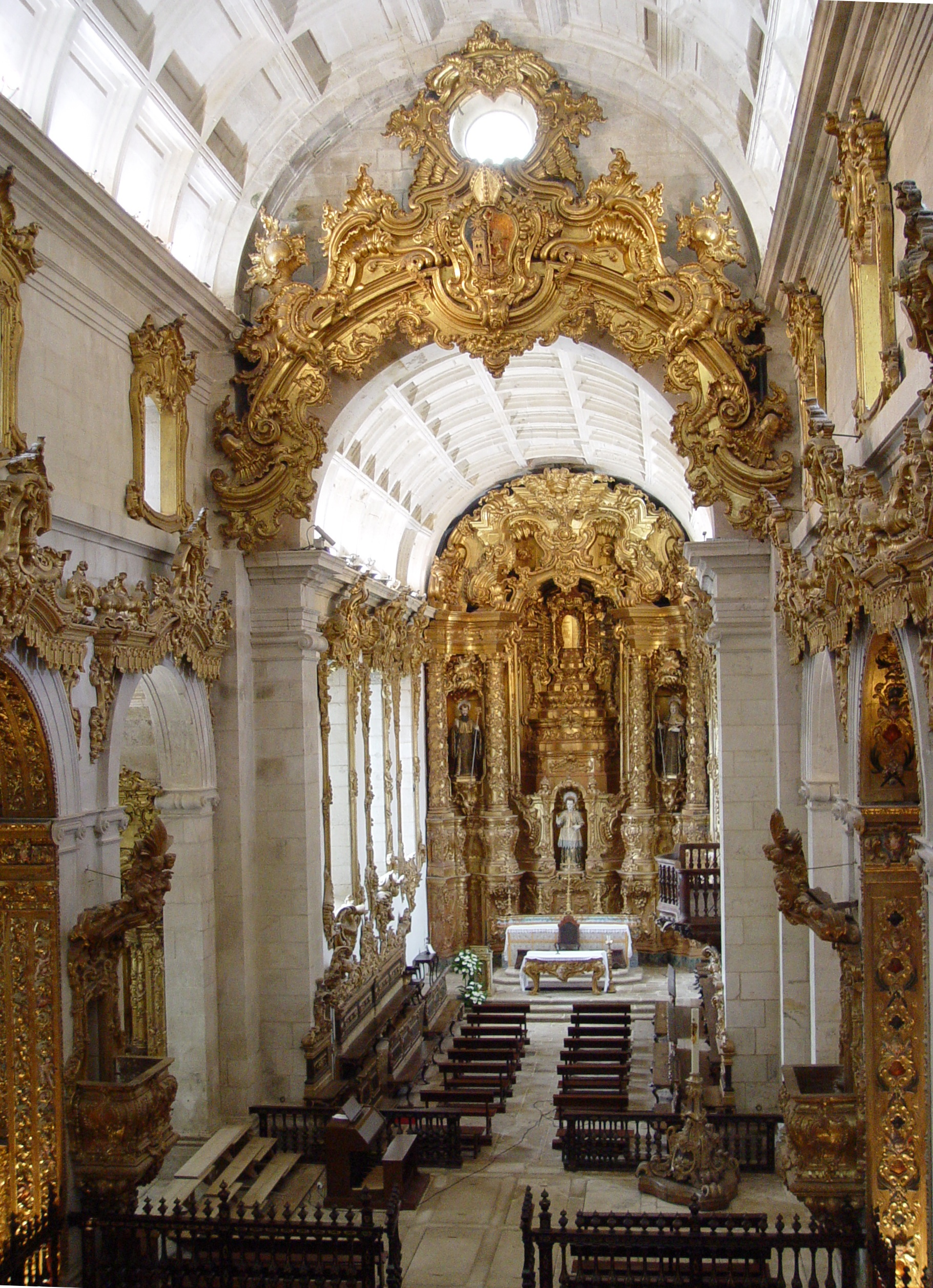
Inner view of the church of the Monastery of Tibães towards the main chapel.

During the 17th and 18th centuries, the monastery was a site of considerable artistic activity and had an enormous influence in the Baroque and Rococo art of Northern Portugal and overseas colonies. In the years 1757-1760, architect André Soares designed the main altarpiece and the woodwork of the triumphal arch of the main chapel, as well as the pulpits and lateral altarpieces, all of which are landmarks in Portuguese Rococo art. The gilded woodwork was sculpted by famed José de Santo António Vilaça. Many statues in the church are by the hand of another celebrated sculptor, Cipriano da Cruz.

After it was sold at auction in 1864, the Tibães Monastery and its surrounding areas fell into decay and ruin. A great part of the ensemble, including the refectory cloister, was destroyed in a fire in 1894. In 1986 the Monastery became state property, and an extensive recovery project was begun that continues to this day.
