= Colfax Municipal Building =

- U.S. National Register of Historic Places
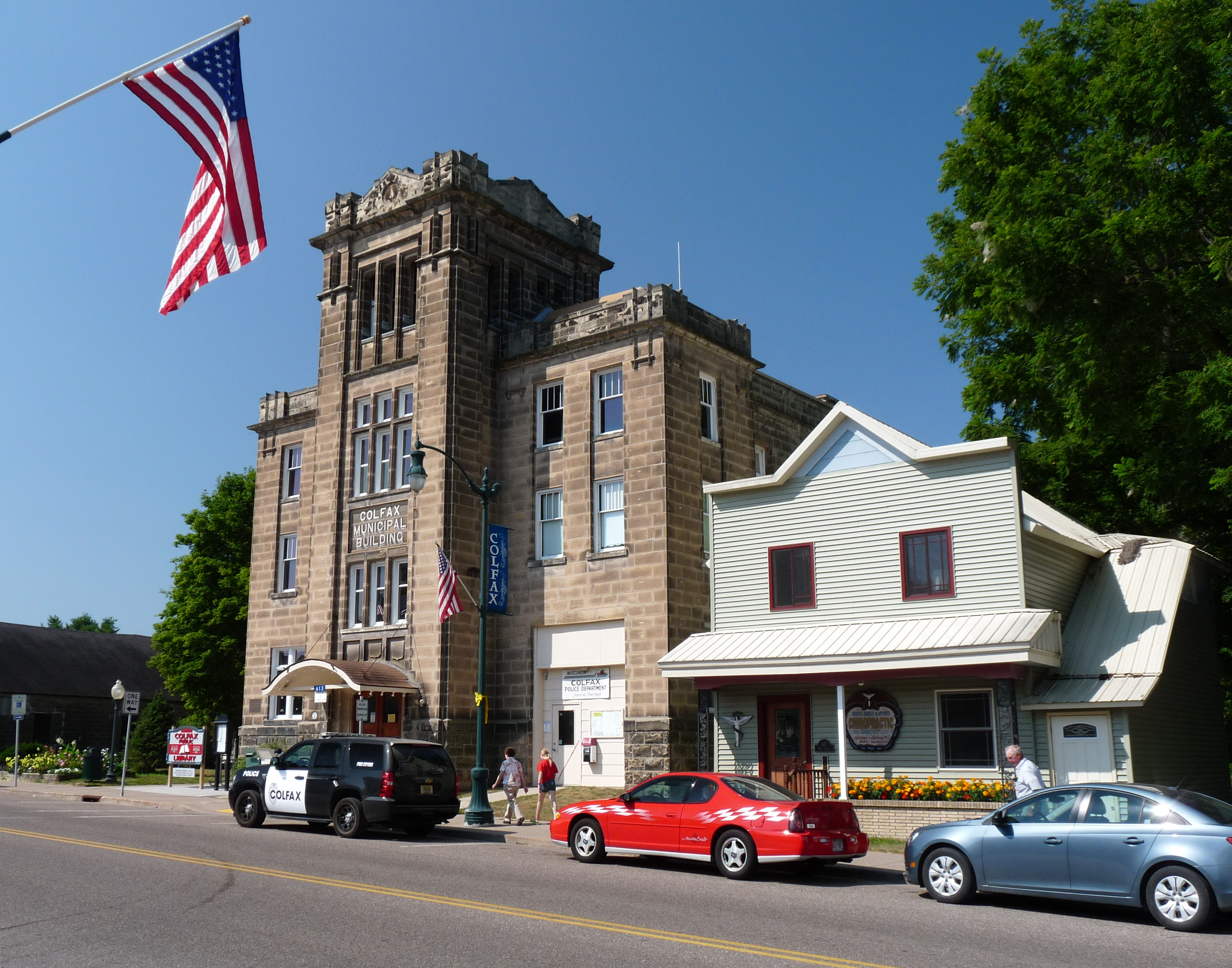

- Location within Wisconsin Location within the United States
- Location: 613 Main St., Colfax, Wisconsin
- Coordinates: 45°0′3″N 91°43′40″W
- Area: less than one acre
- Built: 1916
- Built by: Wisconsin Construction Company
- Architect: Carl Volkman, Carl
- Architectural style: Late 19th And 20th Century Revivals
- NRHP reference No.: 03001542
- Added to NRHP: January 28, 2004

The Colfax Municipal Building is a historic building in Colfax, Wisconsin. The building was designed by Carl Volkman and constructed from 1915 to 1916 by the Wisconsin Construction Company. It incorporates elements of the Beaux-Arts and Late Gothic Revival styles. It was built using local "Colfax sandstone", the sandstone industry having been important to the region at the time. The building served many purposes during its existence; at various points, it housed a police station, a fire station, the village council, an auditorium, and a banquet hall, and the village library still uses the building. Multipurpose buildings of this nature were common in Wisconsin, and the building serves as an example of the role municipal governments played in communities. The building was listed on the National Register of Historic Places on January 28, 2004.
