= Lancaster Municipal Building (Lancaster, Wisconsin) =

- U.S. National Register of Historic Places
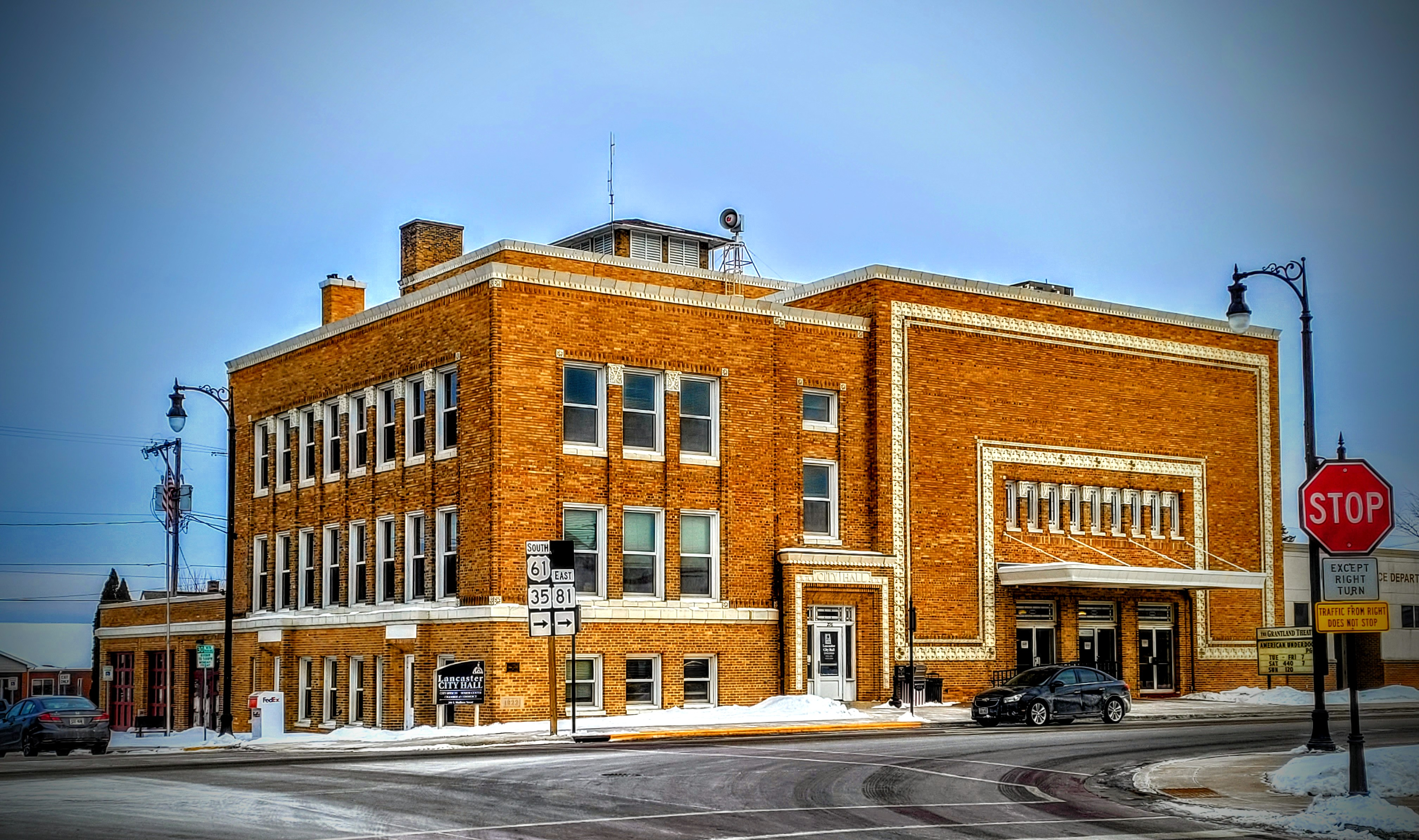

- Location within Wisconsin Location within the United States
- Interactive map showing the location of Lancaster Municipal Building
- Location: 206 S. Madison St. Lancaster, Wisconsin
- Coordinates: 42.8467°N 90.70933°W
- Built: 1923
- Architect: Claude and Starck
- Architectural style: Prairie School
- NRHP reference No.: 83003397
- Added to NRHP: March 10, 1983

The Lancaster Municipal Building is a multi-purpose public building in Lancaster, Wisconsin. It houses the city hall and the Grantland Theatre, a single screen movie theatre and community performance venue. The building was added to the National Register of Historic Places in 1983 for its significance as an example of local Prairie School architecture. The facade features amber colored brick and white terra cotta ornamentation, while the interior includes oak moldings and plaster decoration.

== History ==
Madison architects Claude and Starck designed the building in 1923 to house city offices, meeting rooms, the fire department and a theater. Its cost was reported to be $130,000. The concept of a mixed-use city hall and theater was likely inspired by the Richland Center City Auditorium built in nearby Richland Center, Wisconsin in 1912.

The building has had several modifications since its original construction. The fire department moved to an offsite location in 1996, and the original three-bay fire station now houses a senior center meeting space. A single story addition on the south side of the building, originally built for the fire department, now houses the city police station.
