= Braga City Hall =

- Câmara Municipal de Braga
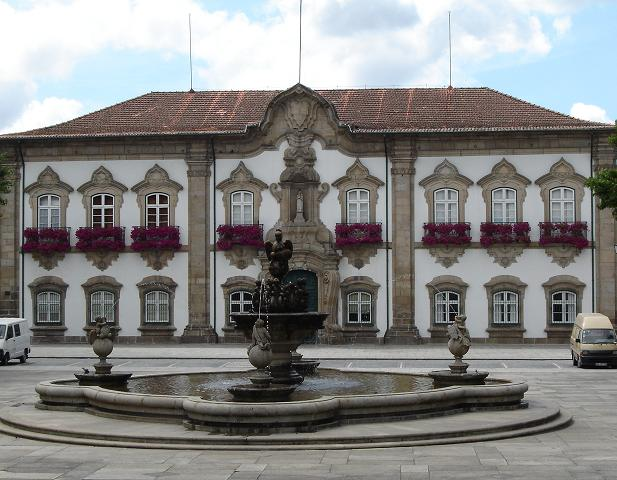
- Main Facade
- Interactive map of the Braga City Hall area

General information
- Location: Portugal
- Coordinates: 41°33′03.6″N 8°25′42.5″W
- Owner: Portuguese Republic

Technical details
- Material: Granite

The Braga Town Hall (in Portuguese Paços do Concelho de Braga) is a landmark building located in Sé parish in the heart of Braga, Portugal. In there is located the headquarters of the Câmara Municipal, the city local government.

== History ==
The current Town Hall, which replaced previous ones, in Renaissance style, was built in the 18th century on the proposal of the then Archbishop of Braga, D. José de Bragança, brother of João V of Portugal.

The building, considered by some experts to be one of the most notable examples of Baroque architecture in the Iberian Peninsula, was built on the site of the old bullring. The project was designed by Braga architect André Soares, being his only work duly documented in the city. Although its construction began in 1753, it was only completely finished in 1865.

It has been classified as a Property of Public Interest since 2002.[1]

== Exterior Features ==
The building has two floors with eight large windows each. The facade presents symmetry between the windows that make up the ground floor and the doors to the balconies on the first floor.

In the central section there is a door-niche-pediment, flanked by strong pilasters, where the portal appears flanked by two large volutes. The doorway was modelled on chair leg designs.

The pediment also highlights several cartouches and the main entrance, topped by an exquisitely carved niche, where the image of Nossa Senhora do Livramento is placed in an acroterium. This sculpture was found in the old Town Hall built next to the Cathedral, demolished in 1775, moving to the Cathedral, where it remained for several years, later occupying the place where it is currently located.
