= List of airports by ICAO code: M =

List of airports by ICAO code: A - B - C - D - EB-EG - EH-EY - FA-FM - FN-FZ - G - H - ~~I~~ - J - KA-KH - KI-KP - KR-KZ - LA-LJ - LK-LZ - M - N - O - P - Q - R - S - T - U - V - W - ~~X~~ - Y - Z

== MB - Turks and Caicos Islands ==
Also see airport category and list.

ICAO	IATA	Airport name	Community	Coordinates
MBAC		Harold Charles International Airport	Ambergris Cay	21°18′02″N 071°38′28″W
MBGT	GDT	JAGS McCartney International Airport (Grand Turk Int'l)	Grand Turk Island	21°26′40″N 071°08′32″W
MBMC	MDS	Middle Caicos Airport	Middle Caicos	21°49′33″N 071°48′09″W
MBNC	NCA	North Caicos Airport	North Caicos	21°55′03″N 071°56′22″W
MBPI	PIC	Pine Cay Airport	Pine Cay	21°52′30″N 072°05′33″W
MBPV	PLS	Providenciales International Airport	Providenciales	21°46′25″N 072°15′57″W
MBSC	XSC	South Caicos Airport	South Caicos	21°30′57″N 071°31′43″W
MBSY	SLX	Salt Cay Airport	Salt Cay	21°20′04″N 071°11′59″W

== MD - Dominican Republic ==
Also see airport category and list.

ICAO	IATA	Airport name	Community	Coordinates	Notes
MDAB	EPS	Arroyo Barril Airport	Samaná	19°11′55″N 069°25′50″W	
MDAD		Azua Dominica Airport	Azua	18°25′28″N 070°43′45″W	
MDAN		Angelina Airport	Cotuí	19°07′52″N 070°13′10″W	
MDBA		Batey Anita Airport	Consuelo	18°41′00″N 069°23′00″W	Closed
MDBC		Batey Cacata Airport	La Romana	18°28′45″N 068°54′51″W	
MDBE		Batey Lechuga Airport	El Seibo	18°35′15″N 069°03′20″W	
MDBG		Baigua Airport	Higüey	18°31′57″N 068°40′10″W	Closed
MDBH	BRX	María Montez International Airport	Barahona	18°15′10″N 071°07′20″W	
MDBL		Batey Luisa Airport	Boca Chica	18°27′03″N 069°35′33″W	Closed
MDCR	CBJ	Cabo Rojo Airport	Pedernales	17°55′45″N 071°38′45″W	
MDCY	AZS	Samaná El Catey International Airport	Samaná	19°16′12″N 069°44′15″W	
MDCZ	COZ	Constanza Airport	Constanza	18°54′27″N 070°43′15″W	
MDDJ	DAJ	Dajabón Airport	Dajabón	19°33′55″N 071°40′30″W	
MDER		El Ranchito Airport	La Vega	19°11′04″N 070°21′59″W	
MDES		Esperanza Airport	Esperanza	19°35′03″N 070°57′25″W	
MDEV		El Valle Airport	El Valle	18°58′35″N 069°22′45″W	Closed
MDHE	HEX	Herrera International Airport	Santo Domingo	18°28′15″N 069°58′09″W	Closed February 2006
MDHN		Enriquillo Airport	Enriquillo	17°52′20″N 071°16′10″W	
MDIG	IGQ	Ingenio Quisqueya Airport	Quisqueya	18°33′03″N 069°23′54″W	
MDJB	JBQ	La Isabela International Airport (Dr. Joaquín Balaguer)	Santo Domingo	18°34′20″N 069°59′08″W	
MDJI		Jimani Airport	Jimaní	18°29′34″N 071°52′11″W	Closed
MDJS		Batey Juan Sanchez Airport	Monte Plata	18°48′36″N 069°47′24″W	Closed
MDLL		Los Llanos de Sabantosa Airport	San José de los Llanos	18°35′47″N 069°31′32″W	
MDLM		Los Montones Airport	San Cristóbal	18°31′15″N 070°05′55″W	
MDLR	LRM	La Romana International Airport	La Romana	18°27′08″N 068°54′40″W	
MDMA		Magdalena Cuya Airport	Higüey	18°30′07″N 068°47′57″W	Closed
MDMC		Osvaldo Virgil Airport	Monte Cristi	19°51′55″N 071°38′43″W	
MDPC	PUJ	Punta Cana International Airport	Punta Cana / Higüey	18°34′00″N 068°21′07″W	
MDPM		Piloto Airport	Guayubín	19°35′52″N 071°12′21″W	
MDPO	EPS	El Portillo Airport	Samaná	19°19′17″N 069°29′45″W	Closed February 2012
MDPP	POP	Puerto Plata Airport (Gregorio Luperón International Airport)	Puerto Plata	19°45′28″N 070°34′12″W	
MDSB	SNX	Sabana de la Mar Airport	Sabana de la Mar	19°03′43″N 069°23′07″W	Closed
MDSD	SDQ	Las Américas-JFPG International Airport (Dr. José Fco. Peña Gómez)	Punta Caucedo (near Santo Domingo)	18°25′46″N 069°40′08″W	
MDSI	ZXD	San Isidro Air Base	San Isidro	18°30′10″N 069°45′45″W	
MDSJ	SJM	San Juan de la Maguana Airport	San Juan de la Maguana	18°50′00″N 071°14′00″W	Closed
MDSM		San Miguel Field	Cotuí	19°03′00″N 070°09′00″W	Closed
MDSP	SPM	Cueva Las Maravillas Airport	San Pedro de Macorís	18°27′05″N 069°10′00″W	
MDST	STI	Cibao International Airport (Santiago Municipal)	Santiago	19°24′22″N 070°36′17″W	
MDWO		Walterio Airport	Monte Cristi	19°45′25″N 071°37′30″W	

== MG - Guatemala ==
Also see airport category and list.

ICAO	IATA	Airport name	Community	Coordinates	Notes
MGAA		Santa Ana Airport	Escuintla	14°14′25″N 090°51′13″W	
MGAI		Nacional Agro Airport	Sayaxché	16°15′18″N 090°09′48″W	
MGAU		Altaventura Airport	Masagua	14°11′35″N 090°46′46″W	
MGBE		Belen Airport	Santa Lucía Cotzumalguapa	14°16′22″N 091°05′35″W	
MGBN		Bananera Airport	Morales, Izabal	15°28′30″N 088°50′15″W	
MGBS		Club Bahia de Santiago Airport	Santiago Atitlán	14°36′26″N 091°14′28″W	
MGBZ		Bello Horizonte Airport	Livingston	15°35′29″N 088°56′45″W	
MGCA		Canillá Airport	Canillá	15°10′14″N 090°51′32″W	
MGCB	CBV	Cobán Airport	Cobán, Alta Verapaz	15°28′10″N 090°24′25″W	
MGCD		Caramelo Airport	Coatepeque	14°33′05″N 092°01′32″W	
MGCK		Chiquibul Airport	Chisec	16°02′05″N 090°23′31″W	
MGCL		Ciudad Luz Airport	San Gabriel	14°30′57″N 091°29′20″W	
MGCN		La Constancia Airport	Panzós	15°18′15″N 089°43′22″W	
MGCP		Champerico Airport	Champerico	14°18′23″N 091°54′00″W	
MGCQ		Chiquimula Airport	Chiquimula	14°49′51″N 089°31′15″W	
MGCR	CMM	Carmelita Airport	Carmelita, El Petén	17°27′45″N 090°03′10″W	
MGCS		Chisec Airport	Chisec	15°48′59″N 090°16′28″W	
MGCT	CTF	Coatepeque Airport	Coatepeque, Quetzaltenango	14°41′40″N 091°52′55″W	
MGCY		Las Cañas Airport	Los Amates	15°24′20″N 089°12′30″W	
MGDI		Desmontadora Nueva Linda Airport	Retalhuleu	14°24′59″N 091°49′00″W	
MGDL		Dos Lagunas Airport	Flores	17°41′31″N 089°31′29″W	Closed
MGDN		Dulce Nombre Airport	Taxisco	14°08′15″N 090°31′22″W	
MGEE		Finca Parque Central Airport	San Francisco	16°44′40″N 089°54′27″W	
MGEF		El Triunfo Airport	Masagua	14°00′55″N 090°46′23″W	
MGEL		Santa Elena Airport	El Estor	15°24′31″N 089°29′39″W	
MGES		Esquipulas Airport	Esquipulas, Chiquimula	14°34′05″N 089°19′30″W	
MGET		Finca El Tesoro Airport	Santa Bárbara	14°27′21″N 091°16′40″W	Closed
MGEV		El Caboa-El Porvenir STOL Airport	Flores	17°03′05″N 089°40′59″W	
MGEX		El Carrizal Airport	Santa Lucía Cotzumalguapa	14°11′46″N 091°08′21″W	
MGFB		Fray Bartolomé Airport	Fray Bartolomé de las Casas	15°48′15″N 089°51′03″W	
MGFI		Finca Ixtan Airport	Champerico	14°16′38″N 091°53′33″W	
MGFX		Finca Xejuyu Airport	Chimaltenango	14°40′35″N 090°47′31″W	
MGGT	GUA	La Aurora International Airport	Guatemala City	14°34′54″N 090°31′36″W	
MGHH		Iztapa Airport	Iztapa	13°55′51″N 090°43′46″W	
MGHT	HUG	Huehuetenango Airport	Huehuetenango, Huehuetenango	15°19′00″N 091°30′20″W	
MGIS		Isabel Airport	Pueblo Nuevo Viñas	14°12′33″N 090°27′22″W	
MGIX		Ixquisis Airport	San Mateo Ixtatán	16°03′45″N 091°25′07″W	
MGJU		Jutiapa Airport	Jutiapa	14°17′29″N 089°56′41″W	
MGLA		La Anchura Airport	Sayaxché	16°31′05″N 090°28′09″W	
MGLC		Los Cuchumatames Airport	Retalhuleu	14°16′05″N 091°47′32″W	Closed
MGLD		Las Delicias Airport	Retalhuleu	14°28′57″N 091°40′48″W	
MGLE		La Estancia Airport	La Libertad	16°48′00″N 090°34′57″W	
MGLF		La Fe Airport	Tiquisate	14°09′49″N 091°27′30″W	
MGLL		La Libertad Airport	La Libertad, El Petén	16°45′00″N 090°08′25″W	
MGLM		Las Margaritas Airport	La Democracia	14°11′12″N 090°58′02″W	
MGLN		Magdalena Airport	La Democracia	14°06′52″N 090°55′36″W	
MGLO		Palo Blanco Primavera Airport	Tiquisate	14°11′12″N 090°58′02″W	
MGLQ		Lanquin Airport	Morales	15°20′44″N 088°52′55″W	
MGLR		La Reforma Airport	Ocós	14°32′11″N 092°11′43″W	
MGLS		San Juan La Selva Airport	Sipacate	13°58′49″N 091°15′46″W	
MGLT		Los Tarros Airport	Santa Lucía Cotzumalguapa	14°23′49″N 090°59′47″W	
MGLU		La Unidad Airport	Colomba	14°41′00″N 091°46′12″W	
MGLY		Finca La Montañesa Airport	La Gomera	14°02′16″N 091°09′07″W	
MGMD		San Miguel Mapan Airport	Patulul	14°16′19″N 091°11′14″W	
MGMG		San Miguel Airport	La Gomera	14°00′49″N 091°12′08″W	
MGML		Malacatán Airport	Malacatán, San Marcos	14°54′28″N 092°05′20″W	
MGMM	FRS	Mundo Maya International Airport	Flores, El Petén	16°54′50″N 089°51′59″W	
MGMN		Mopan Airport	Dolores	16°48′03″N 089°23′36″W	
MGMO		Santa Monica Airport	Sayaxché	16°28′19″N 090°03′31″W	
MGMU		Murcielago Airport	El Estor	15°34′35″N 089°08′43″W	
MGNB		Nebaj Airport	Santa María Nebaj	15°26′49″N 091°09′42″W	
MGNI		Nueva Italia Airport	Flores Costa Cuca	14°37′55″N 091°52′00″W	
MGNM		Nuevo Monaco Airport	Santa Cruz Barillas	15°59′45″N 091°07′54″W	Closed
MGNO		Las Acacias Airport	Nueva Concepción	14°14′06″N 091°16′43″W	
MGNT		Panacte Airport	Panzós	15°19′14″N 089°36′51″W	
MGOA		Monte Alegre Airport	La Gomera	14°05′41″N 091°01′42″W	
MGOX		Pantaleon Airport	Siquinalá	14°20′22″N 090°59′23″W	
MGPB	PBR	Puerto Barrios Airport	Puerto Barrios, Izabal	15°43′50″N 088°35′00″W	
MGPD		Palo Gordo Airport	San Antonio Suchitepéquez	14°30′04″N 091°23′25″W	
MGPG		Playa Grande Airport	Ixcán	15°59′55″N 090°44′30″W	
MGPN		Pueblo Nuevo Airport	Panzós	15°21′38″N 089°35′03″W	
MGPP	PON	Poptún Airport	Poptún, El Petén	16°19′35″N 089°25′00″W	
MGPV		Palo Blanco Airport	Tiquisate	14°06′18″N 091°29′35″W	
MGQC	AQB	Quiché Airport	Quiché, El Quiché	15°00′45″N 091°09′05″W	
MGQZ	AAZ	Quetzaltenango Airport	Quetzaltenango, Quetzaltenango	14°51′55″N 091°30′10″W	
MGRB	RUV	Rubelsanto Airport	Rubelsanto, Alta Verapaz	15°59′30″N 090°26′40″W	
MGRD		Rio Dulce Airport	Livingston	15°40′05″N 088°57′40″W	
MGRF		Monterrico Airport	Taxisco	13°53′41″N 090°29′05″W	
MGRP		San Rafael Olimpo Airport	Cuyotenango	14°34′32″N 091°33′43″W	
MGRT	RER	Retalhuleu Airport / Base Aérea del Sur	Retalhuleu, Retalhuleu	14°31′16″N 091°41′50″W	
MGSH		Sepur Airport	Panzós	15°18′13″N 089°37′38″W	
MGSJ		San José Airport	Puerto San José, Escuintla	13°56′10″N 090°50′09″W	
MGSM		San Marcos Airport	San Marcos, San Marcos	14°57′20″N 091°48′25″W	
MGSN		San Juan La Noria Airport	Tiquisate	14°15′43″N 091°21′28″W	
MGSP		San Patricio Airport	Sayaxché	16°08′52″N 089°56′15″W	
MGST		San Agustin Airport	Patulul	14°29′37″N 091°10′31″W	
MGSY		Semayac Airport	Panzós	15°19′36″N 089°37′10″W	
MGTE		Tehuantepec Airport	Santa Lucía Cotzumalguapa	14°10′08″N 091°05′53″W	
MGTM		Tres Marias Airport	San Luis	16°03′20″N 089°44′46″W	
MGTX		Pataxte Airport	El Estor	15°21′17″N 089°17′45″W	
MGTZ		Tazmania Airport	San José	13°57′44″N 090°52′15″W	
MGVE		Las Vegas Ganaderia Airport	Livingston	15°35′33″N 088°56′16″W	
MGVG		Las Vegas Semillas Airport	Tiquisate	14°08′21″N 091°22′56″W	
MGVS		Las Vegas Frutera del Pacifico Airport	Tiquisate	14°02′04″N 091°27′33″W	
MGZA		Zacapa Airport	Zacapa, Zacapa	14°57′35″N 089°32′20″W	

== MH - Honduras ==
Also see airport category and list.

ICAO	IATA	Airport name	Community	Coordinates	Notes
MHAC		Acensa Airport	Marcovia	13°14′37″N 087°20′29″W	
MHAE		Aerocentro Heliport	San Pedro Sula	15°31′32″N 088°02′18″W	
MHAH		Ahuas Airport	Ahuas	15°28′20″N 084°21′10″W	Closed
MHAL		Lepaguare Agricultural Airport	Juticalpa	14°35′49″N 086°30′27″W	Closed
MHAM		Amapala Airport	Amapala	13°17′02″N 087°37′05″W	Closed
MHAP		Apala Airport	Danlí	14°00′39″N 086°23′21″W	
MHAR		Archaga Airport	Tegucigalpa	14°17′07″N 087°13′45″W	
MHAS		Alas del Socorro Airport	Siguatepeque	14°35′35″N 087°50′26″W	Closed
MHAT		Agua Caliente Airport	Olanchito	15°25′40″N 086°53′42″W	
MHAU		Hacienda Ulua Airport	Silca	14°43′04″N 086°34′15″W	
MHAY		Araslaya Airport	Brus Laguna	15°44′07″N 084°32′36″W	
MHAZ		Azacualpa Sawmill Airport	Juticalpa	14°26′00″N 086°05′21″W	
MHBA		Barbareta Airport	José Santos Guardiola	16°25′59″N 086°08′22″W	
MHBJ		Bijao Choloma Heliport	Choloma	15°42′15″N 087°55′34″W	
MHBL		Brus Laguna Airport	Brus Laguna	15°45′45″N 084°32′35″W	
MHBV		Altos de Bella Vista Heliport	San Pedro Sula	15°30′42″N 088°03′13″W	
MHCB		Cocobila Airport	Brus Laguna	15°53′18″N 084°45′20″W	Closed
MHCD		Cayo Redondo Roatán Heliport	Roatán	15°57′07″N 086°28′30″W	
MHCG		Comayagua Airport	Comayagua	14°34′25″N 088°35′45″W	
MHCI		Chiquerito Airport	Iriona	15°49′55″N 085°01′37″W	Closed
MHCL		Colón Airport	Marcala	14°09′43″N 088°02′04″W	Closed
MHCM		Choloma Airport	San Nicolás	14°53′18″N 088°24′16″W	
MHCN		Concepción Airport	Concepción	14°01′36″N 088°20′39″W	Closed
MHCO		Coco Airport	Puerto Lempira	15°15′10″N 084°14′00″W	
MHCQ		Cristo Te Quiere Airport	Danlí	14°05′00″N 086°38′00″W	Closed
MHCP		Cochino Pequeño Airport	Roatán	15°57′16″N 086°29′55″W	Closed
MHCR		Carta Airport	La Unión	15°01′35″N 086°41′33″W	
MHCS		Coyoles Airport	Olanchito	15°26′45″N 086°40′30″W	
MHCT		Copantl Heliport	San Pedro Sula	15°29′28″N 088°02′13″W	
MHCU		Cauquira Airport	Puerto Lempira	15°19′15″N 083°36′15″W	
MHDS		Diunsa Heliport	San Pedro Sula	15°30′31″N 088°01′10″W	Closed
MHDU		Mocorón Durzuna Airport	Mocorón	14°59′21″N 084°13′15″W	
MHEA	OAN	El Arrayán Airport	Olanchito	15°30′25″N 086°34′35″W	
MHEC		El Cubo Airport	Talanga	14°27′28″N 087°03′31″W	
MHEI		La América Airport	El Progreso	15°38′55″N 087°47′18″W	
MHEL		Barrio El Aterrizaje Airport	El Paraíso	13°52′23″N 086°33′38″W	
MHEN		El Encino Sawmill Airport	Orica	14°39′43″N 086°54′54″W	Closed
MHEO		El Alto Airport	Cedros	14°29′36″N 087°06′23″W	
MHEP		El Pentágono Airport	Arizona	15°35′00″N 087°23′35″W	
MHER		Colonia El Trapiche Heliport	Tegucigalpa	14°04′53″N 087°10′05″W	
MHES		Edi Heliport Airport	San Pedro Sula	15°28′29″N 088°01′36″W	Closed
MHEZ		La Esperanza de Colón Airport	Sonaguera	15°36′35″N 086°08′20″W	
MHFA		Finca San Antonio Airport	Juticalpa	14°35′53″N 086°29′02″W	Closed
MHFC		Fort Cay Airport	José Santos Guardiola	16°24′11″N 086°17′04″W	
MHFD		Finca 12 Airport	El Progreso	15°16′11″N 087°54′10″W	Closed
MHFI		Ficohsa Heliport	San Pedro Sula	15°30′00″N 088°02′59″W	Closed
MHGA		Chumbagua Airport	San Luis	15°10′36″N 088°29′24″W	Closed
MHGB		Guayabillas Airport	Esquías	14°44′48″N 087°22′31″W	Closed
MHGE	CAA	El Aguacate Airport	Catacamas	14°52′30″N 085°46′30″W	
MHGG		Santiago de Puringla Airport	Santiago de Puringla	14°22′03″N 087°54′41″W	Closed
MHGR		Sangrelaya Airport	Iriona	15°58′29″N 085°05′28″W	Closed
MHGS		Celaque Airport	Gracias	14°34′25″N 088°35′45″W	
MHGU		Erandique Gualguire Airport	Erandique	14°14′10″N 088°26′15″W	
MHGV		Ciudad de Naco Heliport	Quimistán	15°20′44″N 088°11′05″W	
MHGY		Guayape Airport	Guayape	14°47′05″N 086°51′48″W	
MHHE		La Herradura Airport	Juticalpa	14°45′18″N 086°00′15″W	Closed
MHHG		Hacienda Galeras Airport	Juticalpa	14°35′56″N 086°27′39″W	Closed
MHIC		Islas del Cisne Airport	Islas del Cisne	17°24′25″N 083°56′00″W	
MHIG		Higuerito Central Airport	Santa Cruz de Yojoa	15°11′18″N 087°56′19″W	
MHIN		Minas de Oro Airport	Minas de Oro	14°47′19″N 087°20′59″W	
MHIP		El Paraíso Omoa Airport	Omoa	15°41′43″N 088°06′31″W	
MHIR		Iriona Airport	Iriona	15°56′21″N 085°08′14″W	
MHIZ		Izapan Airport	Iriona	15°54′37″N 085°10′16″W	
MHJC		Jocón Airport	Jocón	15°17′26″N 086°54′44″W	
MHJE		Nueva Jerusalen Airport	Brus Laguna	15°52′41″N 084°43′35″W	
MHJI		Jicalapa Airport	Gualaco	15°00′25″N 086°03′00″W	
MHJL		Juan Lindo Heliport	San Pedro Sula	15°31′08″N 088°03′04″W	
MHJO		La Joya Airport	Orica	14°48′17″N 086°55′09″W	
MHJQ		Joya del Quebracho Airport	Orica	14°50′20″N 086°57′44″W	
MHJU	JUT	Juticalpa Airport	Juticalpa	14°39′09″N 086°13′13″W	
MHLA		La Alondra Airport	Gualcince	14°06′32″N 088°32′02″W	
MHLC	LCE	Golosón International Airport	La Ceiba	15°44′32″N 086°51′10″W	
MHLE	LEZ	La Esperanza Airport	La Esperanza / Intibucá	14°17′25″N 088°10′30″W	Not to be confused with MHEZ
MHLF		Flefil Airport	Talanga	14°25′24″N 087°07′11″W	
MHLG		La Grecia Airport	Marcovia	13°12′53″N 087°21′49″W	
MHLJ		Las Lajas Airport	Salamá	14°53′41″N 086°34′29″W	Closed
MHLL		Las Lomas Heliport	Tegucigalpa	14°05′23″N 087°10′30″W	
MHLM	SAP	La Mesa International Airport (Ramón Villeda Morales International Airport)	San Pedro Sula	15°27′10″N 087°55′25″W	
MHLN		Limón Airport	Limón	15°51′48″N 085°29′55″W	Closed
MHLP		Mapulaca Airport	Mapulaca	14°02′03″N 088°37′42″W	
MHLR		Los Pinares (El Hatillo) Heliport	Tegucigalpa	14°07′39″N 087°10′52″W	
MHLS		Laguna Seca Airport	San Francisco de Becerra	14°39′07″N 086°04′02″W	Closed
MHLT		Llanos del Tigre Airport	Morocelí	14°04′36″N 086°50′30″W	Closed
MHLU		Luz y Vida Airport	San Luis	15°08′47″N 088°26′40″W	Closed
MHMA	MRJ	Marcala Airport	Marcala	14°09′43″N 088°02′04″W	Closed
MHMC		Hacienda Montecristo Veracruz Heliport	Santa Rosa de Copán	14°52′00″N 088°45′30″W	Closed
MHMI		Las Minitas Airport	Yorito	15°03′04″N 087°14′18″W	Closed
MHMM		San Antonio Malera Airport	San Francisco de Ojuera	14°40′19″N 088°15′18″W	Closed
MHMN		Monica Airport	La Masica	15°39′04″N 087°05′33″W	Closed
MHMO		San Marcos de Ocotepeque Airport	San Marcos	14°24′47″N 088°57′07″W	Closed
MHMP		Marcos Perez Airport	El Progreso	15°17′10″N 087°53′07″W	
MHMS		Las Marias Airport	Brus Laguna	15°40′22″N 084°50′41″W	Closed
MHMT		Manto Airport	Manto	14°54′56″N 086°22′54″W	
MHNB		Noveno Batallón Airport	Danlí	14°02′20″N 086°25′03″W	
MHNC		Nueva Choluteca Airport	Choluteca	13°19′12″N 087°08′57″W	
MHNJ	GJA	Guanaja Airport	Guanaja	16°26′43″N 085°54′24″W	
MHNS		Los Llanos Airport	Marcala	14°12′38″N 088°01′18″W	Closed
MHNV		Nueva Ocotepeque Airport	Nueva Ocotepeque	14°25′50″N 089°11′40″W	
MHOA		El Arrayán Airport	Olanchito	15°30′25″N 086°34′35″W	
MHOC		Coratza Heliport	San Pedro Sula	15°28′21″N 087°59′39″W	Closed
MHOR		Mocorón Airport	Puerto Lempira	15°01′46″N 084°16′17″W	
MHOT		Ocotales Airport	Iriona	15°40′09″N 085°11′40″W	Closed
MHPA		Barra del Patuca Airport	Brus Laguna	15°48′05″N 084°17′48″W	
MHPB		Publigraficos Heliport	San Pedro Sula	15°27′12″N 088°01′19″W	Closed
MHPC		Palacios Airport	Juan Francisco Bulnes	15°57′15″N 084°56′25″W	
MHPD		San Pedro Sula Paper Depot Heliport	San Pedro Sula	15°30′49″N 088°02′06″W	
MHPL	PEU	Puerto Lempira Airport	Puerto Lempira	15°15′45″N 083°46′55″W	
MHPM		Palmeras Heliport Airport	San Pedro Sula	15°31′10″N 088°02′27″W	Closed
MHPR		Palmerola International Airport	Comayagua	14°22′57″N 087°37′16″W	
MHPS		Desvio Potrerillos Airport	Juticalpa	14°35′45″N 086°09′00″W	Closed
MHPU		Puerto Cortes Airport	Puerto Cortes	15°50′20″N 087°55′59″W	Closed
MHPV		El Porvenir Airport	Sabá	15°31′50″N 086°16′30″W	
MHPY		Payasito Airport	Limón	15°52′33″N 085°23′49″W	Closed
MHRA		Rapaco II Airport	Morocelí	14°04′25″N 086°54′36″W	Closed
MHRC		Rio Amarillo Airport	Santa Rita	14°54′58″N 089°00′28″W	
MHRD		Rus Rus II Airport	Puerto Lempira	14°47′14″N 084°22′11″W	
MHRH		Hamer Regional Airport	Sabá	15°33′48″N 086°11′29″W	Closed
MHRI		Tegucigalpa El Rincon Heliport	Tegucigalpa	14°06′56″N 087°10′14″W	
MHRJ		Rancho Jamastran Airport	Danlí	14°03′37″N 086°24′25″W	
MHRM		El Rincón Real Minas Heliport	Tegucigalpa	14°06′50″N 087°10′40″W	
MHRO	RTB	Juan Manuel Gálvez International Airport	Roatán	16°19′02″N 086°31′20″W	
MHRP		Rancho El Paraíso (La Ceiba) Heliport	La Ceiba	15°46′59″N 086°40′22″W	
MHRR		Rus Rus I Airport	Puerto Lempira	14°42′47″N 084°27′09″W	
MHRS		Santa Rosa Airport	La Lima	15°28′07″N 087°49′37″W	Closed
MHRU	RUY	Copán Ruinas Airport	Copán Ruinas	14°55′00″N 089°00′28″W	
MHRY		Raya Airport	Villeda Morales	15°03′59″N 083°17′50″W	
MHSA		San Luis Airport	San Luis	14°44′45″N 087°24′19″W	Closed
MHSB		Santa Bárbara Airport	Santa Bárbara	14°56′17″N 088°14′29″W	Closed
MHSE		Siecsa La Ceiba Heliport	La Ceiba	15°46′52″N 086°45′25″W	
MHSF		San Fernando Airport	Morocelí	14°06′48″N 086°57′10″W	
MHSI		Sico Airport	Iriona	15°49′07″N 085°06′52″W	
MHSJ		San José Airport	Oropolí	13°49′40″N 086°48′37″W	Closed
MHSL		San Lorenzo Airport	San Lorenzo	13°26′32″N 087°27′35″W	
MHSN		Sinaloa Airport	Tocoa	15°41′36″N 085°57′19″W	Closed
MHSP		San Francisco de la Paz Airport	San Francisco de la Paz	14°52′37″N 086°11′29″W	Closed
MHSR	SDH	Santa Rosa de Copán Airport	Santa Rosa de Copán	14°46′38″N 088°46′30″W	Closed
MHSX		Sixatigni Airport	Puerto Lempira	15°11′01″N 084°22′11″W	Closed
MHTA		Tamara Airport	Tegucigalpa	14°10′48″N 087°21′00″W	
MHTB		La Katabila Airport	Puerto Lempira	15°10′30″N 083°40′56″W	
MHTE	TEA	Tela Airport	Tela	15°46′35″N 087°28′30″W	
MHTG	TGU	Toncontín International Airport (Teniente Coronel Hernán Acosta Mejía Airport)	Tegucigalpa	14°03′42″N 087°13′01″W	
MHTI		Tipimuratara Airport	Puerto Lempira	15°00′04″N 083°43′20″W	Closed
MHTJ	TJI	Trujillo Airport	Trujillo	15°55′37″N 085°56′18″W	
MHTL		Talanguita Airport	Cedros	14°29′15″N 087°10′47″W	Closed
MHTM		Santa María Airport	Santa María	14°16′38″N 087°56′12″W	Closed
MHTO		Tocoa Airport	Tocoa	15°39′35″N 085°59′39″W	Closed
MHTR		Trojes Airport	Olanchito	15°24′16″N 086°40′58″W	Closed
MHUC		Auca Airport	Puerto Lempira	14°56′14″N 083°50′39″W	
MHUH		Uhi Airport	Puerto Lempira	15°30′09″N 083°56′19″W	
MHUL		Sulaco Airport	Sulaco	14°54′37″N 087°15′44″W	Closed
MHUN		Guanacastal Airport	Santa Cruz de Yojoa	14°54′56″N 087°50′00″W	Closed
MHUO		La Unión Airport	La Unión, Lempira	14°48′29″N 088°25′12″W	Closed
MHUT	UII	Útila Airport	Útila	16°06′45″N 086°52′50″W	
MHUY		Cucuyagua Airport	San Pedro	14°37′37″N 088°52′35″W	
MHVE		Villa Hermosa Airport	Tambla	14°13′49″N 088°47′58″W	Closed
MHVG		Villa Guadalupe Airport	San José de Colinas	15°02′44″N 088°18′32″W	
MHVR		Volar Heliport	San Pedro Sula	15°26′56″N 088°01′24″W	
MHWA		Wampusirpi I Airport	Wampusirpi	15°09′37″N 084°37′02″W	Closed
MHWD		Wampusirpi II Airport	Wampusirpi	15°09′33″N 084°35′54″W	
MHWP		Waplaya Airport	Puerto Lempira	15°12′47″N 084°04′07″W	Closed
MHWR		Warunta Airport	Ahuas	15°20′55″N 084°14′04″W	
MHWS		Wasma Airport	Ahuas	15°28′39″N 084°25′10″W	Closed
MHWW		Wawina Airport	Ahuas	15°24′58″N 084°28′25″W	Closed
MHYO		Yodeco Airport	Yoro	15°11′00″N 087°04′10″W	
MHYR	ORO	Yoro Airport	Yoro	15°07′40″N 087°08′08″W	
MHYX		Yaxu Airport	Puerto Lempira	15°16′39″N 083°49′13″W	Closed
MHZA		Azacualpa Airport	Dolores, Intibucá	14°15′25″N 088°23′33″W	Closed

== MK - Jamaica ==
Also see airport category and list.

ICAO	IATA	Airport name	Community	Coordinates
MKBS	OCJ	Ian Fleming International Airport	Boscobel, Ocho Rios	18°24′15″N 076°58′08″W
MKJP	KIN	Norman Manley International Airport	Kingston	17°56′08″N 076°47′15″W
MKJS	MBJ	Sangster International Airport	Montego Bay	18°30′13″N 077°54′48″W
MKKJ	POT	Ken Jones Aerodrome	Port Antonio	18°11′55″N 076°32′04″W
MKNG	NEG	Negril Aerodrome	Negril	18°20′24″N 078°20′08″W
MKTP	KTP	Tinson Pen Aerodrome	Kingston	17°59′18″N 076°49′25″W

== MM - Mexico ==
Also see airport category and list.

ICAO	IATA	Airport name	Community	Coordinates	Notes
MMAA	ACA	Acapulco International Airport (General Juan N. Álvarez International Airport)	Acapulco, Guerrero	16°45′22″N 099°45′06″W	
MMAG	AZG	Apatzingán National Airport (Pablo L Sidar National Airport)	Apatzingán, Michoacán	19°05′36″N 102°23′37″W	
MMAL		Agualeguas National Airport	Agualeguas, Nuevo León	26°20′02″N 099°32′33″W	
MMAN	NTR	Monterrey-Del Norte International Airport	Monterrey, Nuevo León	25°51′56″N 100°14′17″W	
MMAS	AGU	Aguascalientes International Airport (Lic. Jesús Terán Peredo International Airport)	Aguascalientes, Aguascalientes	21°42′20″N 102°19′04″W	
MMBT	HUX	Huatulco International Airport (Bahias de Huatulco International Airport)	Huatulco, Oaxaca	15°46′31″N 096°15′45″W	
MMCA	CNA	Cananea Airfield	Cananea, Sonora	31°03′57″N 110°05′48″W	
MMCB	CVJ	Cuernavaca Airport (General Mariano Matamoros International Airport)	Cuernavaca, Morelos	18°50′06″N 099°15′43″W	
MMCC	ACN	Ciudad Acuña International Airport	Ciudad Acuña, Coahuila	29°20′02″N 101°06′03″W	
MMCD		Isla de Cedros Airfield	Cedros Island, Baja California	28°02′15″N 115°11′22″W	
MMCE	CME	Ciudad del Carmen International Airport	Ciudad del Carmen, Campeche	18°39′13″N 091°47′56″W	
MMCG	NCG	Nuevo Casas Grandes Municipal Airport	Nuevo Casas Grandes, Chihuahua	30°23′51″N 107°52′30″W	
MMCH		Chilpancingo National Airport	Chilpancingo, Guerrero	17°34′26″N 099°30′52″W	
MMCL	CUL	Culiacán International Airport (Federal de Bachigualato International Airport)	Culiacán, Sinaloa	24°45′52″N 107°28′28″W	
MMCM	CTM	Chetumal International Airport	Chetumal, Quintana Roo	18°30′17″N 088°19′37″W	
MMCN	CEN	Ciudad Obregón International Airport	Ciudad Obregón, Sonora	27°23′33″N 109°49′59″W	
MMCO	CJT	Copalar Air Force Base	Comitán, Chiapas	16°10′36″N 092°03′01″W	
MMCP	CPE	Campeche International Airport (Ing. Alberto Acuña Ongay International Airport)	Campeche, Campeche	19°49′00″N 090°30′01″W	
MMCS	CJS	Ciudad Juárez International Airport (Abraham González International Airport)	Ciudad Juárez, Chihuahua	31°38′11″N 106°25′43″W	
MMCT	CZA	Chichen Itza International Airport	Chichen Itza, Yucatán	20°38′29″N 088°26′46″W	
MMCU	CUU	Chihuahua International Airport (General Roberto Fierro Villalobos International Airport)	Chihuahua, Chihuahua	28°42′10″N 105°57′42″W	
MMCV	CVM	Ciudad Victoria International Airport (General Pedro J. Méndez International Airport)	Ciudad Victoria, Tamaulipas	23°42′14″N 098°57′23″W	
MMCY	CYW	Celaya Airport (Captain Rogelio Castillo National Airport)	Celaya, Guanajuato	20°32′45″N 100°53′11″W	
MMCZ	CZM	Cozumel International Airport	Cozumel, Quintana Roo	20°30′54″N 086°55′44″W	
MMDA	CUA	Ciudad Constitución Airport	Ciudad Constitución, Baja California Sur	25°03′14″N 111°36′54″W	
MMDM	MMC	Ciudad Mante National Airport	Ciudad Mante, Tamaulipas	22°44′25″N 099°01′05″W	
MMDO	DGO	Durango International Airport (General Guadalupe Victoria International Airport)	Durango, Durango	24°07′27″N 104°31′53″W	
MMEP	TPQ	Tepic International Airport (Amado Nervo International Airport)	Tepic, Nayarit	21°25′10″N 104°50′33″W	
MMES	ESE	Ensenada Airport	Ensenada, Baja California	31°47′43″N 116°36′09″W	
MMGA		Creel Airport (Barrancas del Cobre Airport)	Creel, Chihuahua	27°43′33″N 107°39′15″W	
MMGD		Isla Guadalupe Airport	Isla Guadalupe, Baja California	29°01′23″N 118°16′21″W	
MMGL	GDL	Guadalajara International Airport (Don Miguel Hidalgo y Costilla International Airport)	Guadalajara, Jalisco	20°31′18″N 103°18′40″W	
MMGM	GYM	Guaymas International Airport (General José María Yáñez International Airport)	Guaymas, Sonora	27°58′08″N 110°55′30″W	
MMGR	GUB	Guerrero Negro Airport	Guerrero Negro, Baja California Sur	28°01′33″N 114°01′26″W	
MMGT		Guanajuato Airport	Guanajuato, Guanajuato	20°54′23″N 101°20′30″W	
MMHC	TCN	Tehuacán Airport	Tehuacán, Puebla	18°29′49″N 097°25′11″W	
MMHO	HMO	Hermosillo International Airport (General Ignacio Pesqueira Garcia International Airport)	Hermosillo, Sonora	29°05′45″N 111°02′52″W	
MMHZ		Miguel Carrillo Ayala Aerodrome	Zitácuaro, Michoacán	19°28′00″N 100°26′37″W	Closed
MMIA	CLQ	Colima Airport (Lic. Miguel de la Madrid Airport)	Colima, Colima	19°16′37″N 103°34′38″W	
MMIM	ISJ	Isla Mujeres Airport	Isla Mujeres, Quintana Roo	21°14′42″N 086°44′23″W	
MMIO	SLW	Saltillo Airport (Plan de Guadalupe International Airport)	Saltillo, Coahuila	25°32′58″N 100°55′43″W	
MMIT	IZT	Ixtepec Airport	Ixtepec, Oaxaca	16°26′47″N 095°05′37″W	
MMJA	JAL	Xalapa Airport (El Lencero Airport)	Xalapa, Veracruz	19°28′30″N 096°47′51″W	
MMJC	AZP	Atizapán Jorge Jiménez Cantú National Airport	Mexico City	19°34′29″N 099°17′20″W	
MMLB		Loma Bonita Air Force Station	Loma Bonita, Oaxaca	18°01′21″N 095°51′14″W	
MMLC	LZC	Lázaro Cárdenas Airport	Lázaro Cárdenas, Michoacán	18°00′06″N 102°13′13″W	
MMLM	LMM	Los Mochis International Airport (Federal del Valle del Fuerte International Airport)	Los Mochis, Sinaloa	25°41′06″N 109°04′50″W	
MMLO	BJX	León/Bajío International Airport	Silao, Guanajuato	20°59′36″N 101°28′51″W	
MMLP	LAP	La Paz International Airport (Manuel Márquez de León International Airport)	La Paz, Baja California Sur	24°04′21″N 110°21′44″W	
MMLT	LTO	Loreto International Airport	Loreto, Baja California Sur	25°59′21″N 111°20′54″W	
MMMA	MAM	Matamoros International Airport (General Servando Canales International Airport)	Matamoros, Tamaulipas	25°46′12″N 097°31′31″W	
MMMD	MID	Mérida International Airport (Manuel Crescencio Rejón International Airport)	Mérida, Yucatán	20°56′13″N 089°39′28″W	
MMMG		Mulegé Municipal Airstrip	Mulegé, Baja California Sur	26°54′24″N 111°58′05″W	
MMML	MXL	Mexicali International Airport (General Rodolfo Sánchez Taboada International Airport)	Mexicali, Baja California	32°37′50″N 115°14′29″W	
MMMM	MLM	Morelia International Airport (General Francisco J. Mujica International Airport)	Morelia, Michoacán	19°51′00″N 101°01′32″W	
MMMT	MTT	Minatitlán International Airport	Minatitlán, Veracruz	18°06′13″N 094°34′51″W	
MMMV	LOV	Monclova International Airport (Venustiano Carranza International Airport)	Monclova, Coahuila	26°57′21″N 101°28′12″W	
MMMX	MEX	Mexico City International Airport (Lic. Benito Juárez International Airport)	Mexico City	19°26′10″N 099°04′19″W	
MMMY	MTY	Monterrey International Airport (General Mariano Escobedo International Airport)	Monterrey, Nuevo León	25°46′42″N 100°06′23″W	
MMMZ	MZT	Mazatlán International Airport (General Rafael Buelna International Airport)	Mazatlán, Sinaloa	23°09′41″N 106°15′58″W	
MMNG	NOG	Nogales International Airport	Nogales, Sonora	31°13′34″N 110°58′33″W	
MMNL	NLD	Nuevo Laredo International Airport (Quetzalcóatl International Airport)	Nuevo Laredo, Tamaulipas	27°26′38″N 099°34′14″W	
MMNV	NVJ	Navojoa Airport	Navojoa, Sonora	26°59′25″N 109°24′58″W	
MMOX	OAX	Oaxaca International Airport (Xoxocotlán International Airport)	Oaxaca, Oaxaca	17°00′00″N 096°43′36″W	
MMPA	PAZ	Poza Rica Airport (El Tajín National Airport)	Poza Rica, Veracruz	20°36′09″N 097°27′39″W	
MMPB	PBC	Puebla International Airport (Hermanos Serdán International Airport)	Puebla, Puebla	19°09′29″N 098°22′17″W	
MMPC		Pachuca National Airport (Ingeniero Juan Guillermo Villasana National Airport)	Pachuca, Hidalgo	20°04′38″N 098°46′58″W	
MMPD		Pie de la Cuesta Air Force Base	Acapulco, Guerrero	16°54′37″N 099°59′19″W	
MMPE	PPE	Puerto Peñasco International Airport (Mar de Cortés International Airport)	Puerto Peñasco, Sonora	31°21′07″N 113°18′20″W	
MMPG	PDS	Piedras Negras International Airport	Piedras Negras, Coahuila	28°37′39″N 100°32′07″W	
MMPN	UPN	Uruapan International Airport (Lic. y Gen. Ignacio López Rayón Airport)	Uruapan, Michoacán	19°23′48″N 102°02′21″W	
MMPP		Punta Pescadero Airstrip	Punta Pescadero, Baja California Sur	23°48′12″N 109°42′26″W	
MMPQ	PQM	Palenque International Airport	Palenque, Chiapas	17°32′06″N 092°00′54″W	
MMPR	PVR	Puerto Vallarta International Airport (Licenciado Gustavo Díaz Ordaz International Airport)	Puerto Vallarta, Jalisco	20°40′48″N 105°15′15″W	
MMPS	PXM	Puerto Escondido International Airport	Puerto Escondido, Oaxaca	15°52′36″N 097°05′20″W	
MMQT	QRO	Querétaro Intercontinental Airport (replaced Ing. Fernando Espinoza Gutiérrez International Airport)	Querétaro, Querétaro	20°37′03″N 100°11′08″W	
MMRX	REX	Reynosa International Airport (General Lucio Blanco International Airport)	Reynosa, Tamaulipas	26°00′32″N 098°13′42″W	
MMSC	SZT	San Cristóbal de las Casas National Airport	San Cristobal de las Casas, Chiapas	16°41′24″N 092°31′48″W	Closed 2010
MMSD	SJD	Los Cabos International Airport	San José del Cabo, Baja California Sur	23°09′06″N 109°43′15″W	
MMSF	SFH	San Felipe International Airport	San Felipe, Baja California	30°55′49″N 114°48′59″W	
MMSG		Santa Gertrudis Air Force Base	Santa Gertrudis, Chihuahua	27°47′11″N 105°42′00″W	
MMSL		Cabo San Lucas International Airport	Cabo San Lucas, Baja California Sur	22°56′51″N 109°56′13″W	
MMSM	NLU	Mexico City-AIFA (Felipe Ángeles International Airport)	Mexico City	19°45′24″N 099°00′55″W	
MMSP	SLP	San Luis Potosí International Airport (Ponciano Arriaga International Airport)	San Luis Potosí, San Luis Potosí	22°15′16″N 100°55′51″W	
MMSZ	SCX	Salina Cruz Naval Air Base	Salina Cruz, Oaxaca	16°12′45″N 095°12′05″W	Closed
MMTA		Atlangatepec Air Force Station	Atlangatepec, Tlaxcala	19°31′54″N 098°10′38″W	
MMTB	TGM	Tuxtla Gutiérrez Air Force Base (formerly Francisco Sarabia National Airport)	Tuxtla Gutiérrez, Chiapas	16°44′24″N 093°10′24″W	
MMTC	TRC	Torreón International Airport (Francisco Sarabia International Airport)	Torreón, Coahuila	25°34′05″N 103°24′38″W	
MMTG	TGZ	Tuxtla Gutiérrez International Airport (Angel Albino Corzo International Airport)	Tuxtla Gutiérrez, Chiapas	16°33′49″N 093°01′21″W	
MMTJ	TIJ	Tijuana International Airport (General Abelardo L. Rodríguez International Airport)	Tijuana, Baja California	32°32′27″N 116°58′12″W	
MMTL	TQO	Tulum International Airport	Tulum, Quintana Roo	20°10′20″N 087°39′38″W	
MMTM	TAM	Tampico International Airport (General Francisco Javier Mina International Airport)	Tampico, Tamaulipas	22°17′47″N 097°51′57″W	
MMTN	TSL	Tamuín National Airport	Tamuín, San Luis Potosí	22°02′41″N 098°48′21″W	
MMTO	TLC	Toluca International Airport (Lic. Adolfo López Mateos International Airport)	Toluca, State of Mexico	19°20′13″N 099°33′57″W	
MMTP	TAP	Tapachula International Airport	Tapachula, Chiapas	14°47′40″N 092°22′12″W	
MMTU	TUY	Tulum Naval Air Base	Tulum, Quintana Roo	20°13′38″N 087°26′18″W	Closed
MMTX		Tuxpan Naval Air Base	Tuxpan, Veracruz	19°35′54″N 103°22′20″W	
MMUN	CUN	Cancún International Airport	Cancún, Quintana Roo	21°02′12″N 086°52′37″W	
MMVA	VSA	Villahermosa International Airport (Carlos Rovirosa Pérez International Airport)	Villahermosa, Tabasco	17°59′42″N 092°49′02″W	
MMVR	VER	Veracruz International Airport (General Heriberto Jara International Airport)	Veracruz, Veracruz	19°08′45″N 096°11′14″W	
MMZC	ZCL	Zacatecas International Airport (General Leobardo C. Ruiz International Airport) (La Calera Airport)	Zacatecas, Zacatecas	22°53′50″N 102°41′13″W	
MMZH	ZIH	Ixtapa-Zihuatanejo International Airport	Zihuatanejo, Guerrero	17°36′05″N 101°27′37″W	
MMZM	ZMM	Zamora National Airport	Zamora, Michoacán	20°02′42″N 102°16′33″W	
MMZO	ZLO	Manzanillo International Airport (Playa de Oro International Airport)	Manzanillo, Colima	19°08′41″N 104°33′31″W	
MMZP		Zapopan Air Force Base	Zapopan, Jalisco	20°44′00″N 103°27′32″W	

== MN - Nicaragua ==
Also see airport category and list.

ICAO	IATA	Airport name	Community	Coordinates	Notes
MNAL		Alamikamba Airport	Alamikamba, Prinzapolka RAAN (Zelaya)	13°30′50″N 084°14′50″W	
MNAM		Altamira Airport	Altamira, Boaco	12°08′10″N 085°42′55″W	
MNBC		Boaco Airport	Boaco, Boaco	12°28′09″N 085°39′45″W	Closed
MNBL	BEF	Bluefields International Airport	Bluefields, RAAS (Zelaya)	11°59′27″N 083°46′27″W	
MNBR		Los Brasiles Airport	Los Brasiles, Managua	12°11′24″N 086°21′14″W	
MNBZ	BZA	San Pedro Airport	Bonanza, RAAN (Zelaya)	14°02′10″N 084°37′30″W	
MNCE	ECI	Emerald Coast Airport	Tola, Rivas	11°25′40″N 086°02′00″W	
MNCH		Chinandega Airport	Chinandega, Chinandega	12°38′22″N 087°08′15″W	
MNCI	RNI	Corn Island Airport	Corn Island, RAAS (Zelaya)	12°10′17″N 083°03′38″W	
MNCT		Corinto Airport	Corinto, Chinandega	12°28′44″N 087°10′38″W	
MNDM		Dos Montes Airport	Dos Montes, León	12°48′02″N 086°08′54″W	
MNEP		La Esperanza Airport	La Esperanza, RAAS (Zelaya)	12°11′58″N 084°16′30″W	
MNES		Estelí Airport	Estelí, Estelí	13°06′42″N 086°21′48″W	Closed
MNFC		Punta Huete Airport (Panchito)	Punta Huete, San Francisco Libre, Managua	12°21′12″N 086°11′00″W	
MNFF		El Bluff Airport	El Bluff, RAAS (Zelaya)	11°59′30″N 083°41′22″W	Closed
MNHG		Hato Grande Airport	Hato Grande, Chontales	11°58′55″N 085°26′00″W	
MNJG		Jinotega Airport	Jinotega, Jinotega	13°05′09″N 085°59′16″W	Closed
MNJU		Juigalpa Airport	Juigalpa, Chontales	12°04′25″N 085°24′07″W	Closed
MNKW		Karawala Airport	Karawala, RAAS (Zelaya)	12°56′04″N 083°34′38″W	
MNLL		Las Lajas Airport	Las Lajas, Granada	12°09′11″N 085°54′30″W	
MNLN		León Airport (Fanor Urroz)	León, León	12°25′45″N 086°54′10″W	
MNMA		Macantaca Airport	Macantaca (Makantaca), RAAN (Zelaya)	13°19′19″N 084°09′16″W	Closed
MNMG	MGA	Managua International Airport (Augusto Cesar Sandino International Airport)	Managua, Managua	12°08′29″N 086°10′05″W	
MNMR		Montelimar Airport	San Rafael del Sur, Managua	11°48′20″N 086°30′40″W	
MNMT		La Cumplida Airport	La Cumplida, Matagalpa	12°59′45″N 085°51′10″W	
MNNG	NVG	Nueva Guinea Airport	Nueva Guinea, RAAS (Zelaya)	11°41′12″N 084°27′30″W	Closed
MNOM		Ometepe Airport	Ometepe, Rivas	11°31′25″N 085°42′05″W	
MNPA		Palcasa Airport	El Castillo, Río San Juan	11°04′00″N 084°24′35″W	
MNPC	PUZ	Puerto Cabezas Airport	Puerto Cabezas, RAAN (Zelaya)	14°02′15″N 083°23′12″W	
MNPG		Pikin Guerrero Airport	Pikin Guerrero, Chontales	11°55′20″N 085°20′20″W	
MNPP		El Papalonal Airport	El Papalonal, León	12°28′15″N 086°28′25″W	
MNRS		Rivas Airport	Rivas, Rivas	11°25′40″N 085°50′19″W	Closed
MNRT		Rosita Airport	Rosita, RAAN (Zelaya)	13°53′30″N 084°24′30″W	
MNRV		Morgan's Rock Airport	San Juan del Sur, Rivas	11°18′55″N 085°54′30″W	
MNSC		San Carlos Airport	San Carlos, Río San Juan	11°08′00″N 084°46′20″W	
MNSI	SIU	Siuna Airport	Siuna, RAAN (Zelaya)	13°43′50″N 084°46′40″W	
MNSN		San Juan de Nicaragua Airport	San Juan de Nicaragua, Río San Juan	10°55′14″N 083°42′30″W	
MNWP	WSP	Waspam Airport	Waspam, RAAN (Zelaya)	14°44′25″N 083°58′10″W	

== HP - Panama ==
Also see airport category and list.

ICAO	IATA	Airport name	Community	Coordinates	Notes
MPAC		Achutupo Airport	Achutupo	09°11′21″N 077°59′39″W	
MPAI		Ailigandí Airport	Ailigandí	09°13′05″N 078°01′59″W	
MPAR		Arenas Airport	Mariato	07°22′10″N 080°50′47″W	
MPBO	BOC	Bocas del Toro "Isla Colón" International Airport (José Ezequiel Hall International Airport)	Bocas del Toro	09°20′27″N 082°15′00″W	
MPBR		Finca Blanco Airport	Rodolfo Aguilar Delgado	08°23′28″N 082°52′08″W	
MPCA		Caledonia Airport	Tubualá	08°54′05″N 077°41′36″W	
MPCE	CTD	Chitré Alonso Valderrama Airport	Chitré	07°59′15″N 080°24′35″W	
MPCH	CHX	Captain Manuel Niño International Airport	Changuinola	09°27′32″N 082°32′55″W	
MPCJ		Corazón de Jesús Airport	Corazón de Jesús	09°27′05″N 078°34′59″W	
MPCL		Calzada Larga Airport	Calzada Larga	09°10′00″N 079°32′43″W	
MPCM		Chame Airport	Chame	08°35′20″N 079°53′23″W	
MPCO		Coiba Airport	Montijo	07°30′26″N 081°41′53″W	
MPCS		Casaya Airport	San Miguel	08°31′14″N 079°01′11″W	
MPDA	DAV	Enrique Malek International Airport	David	08°23′30″N 082°26′04″W	
MPEJ	ONX	Enrique Adolfo Jiménez Airport	Colón	09°21′24″N 079°52′03″W	
MPES		La Especial Airport	24 de Diciembre	09°04′39″N 079°20′48″W	
MPFC		Finca 45 Airport	24 de Diciembre	09°32′33″N 082°44′01″W	
MPFE		Fernando Eleta Airport	Isla Pedro Gonzalez	08°24′40″N 079°06′40″W	
MPGA	GHE	Garachiné Airport	Garachiné	08°04′05″N 078°21′59″W	
MPGU		Augusto Vergara Airport	Guararé	07°51′26″N 080°16′34″W	
MPHH		Santo Tomás Hospital Heliport	Calidonia	08°58′14″N 079°31′56″W	
MPHM		Megapolis Heliport	San Francisco	08°58′39″N 079°31′04″W	
MPHT		The Panama Clinic Heliport	San Francisco	08°58′42″N 079°30′43″W	
MPHU		Punta Barco Heliport	San Carlos	08°31′03″N 079°54′56″W	
MPFS		Fort Sherman Airport	Fort Sherman	09°21′47″N 079°57′11″W	
MPIO		Ingenio Ofelina Airport	Natá	08°17′57″N 080°30′48″W	
MPIR		Importadora Ricamar Heliport	Río Abajo	09°01′27″N 079°29′46″W	
MPJE	JQE	Jaqué Airport	Jaqué	07°31′05″N 078°09′25″W	
MPLA		Las Lajas Airport	Lajas Adentro	08°14′05″N 081°52′59″W	
MPLP	PLP	Captain Ramon Xatruch Airport	La Palma	08°24′25″N 078°08′30″W	Closed
MPLY		Lago Bay Airport	Hicaco	07°41′15″N 081°12′09″W	
MPMA		Mamitupo Airport	Ailigandí	09°11′05″N 077°58′59″W	
MPMB		Missions Beyond Aviation Airport	Las Lajas	08°14′37″N 081°51′51″W	
MPMC		Chame Mayor Airport	Chame	08°35′31″N 079°52′09″W	
MPMF		Miraflores Airport	La Palma	08°20′20″N 078°07′55″W	
MPMG	PAC	Albrook "Marcos A. Gelabert" International Airport	Panama City	08°58′24″N 079°33′20″W	
MPMI	NMG	San Miguel Airport	San Miguel	08°27′25″N 078°56′00″W	
MPMN		Mansucum Airport	Tubualá	09°03′05″N 077°48′36″W	
MPMU		Mulatupo Airport	Tubualá	08°56′44″N 077°44′00″W	
MPOA	PUE	Puerto Obaldia Airport	Puerto Obaldia	08°40′10″N 077°25′03″W	
MPOG		Ustupu-Ogobsucum Airport	Ailigandí	09°08′05″N 077°56′59″W	
MPOR		Ocean Reef Heliport	San Francisco	08°58′00″N 079°30′14″W	
MPPA	BLB	Panamá Pacífico International Airport (formerly Howard Air Force Base)	Balboa	08°54′54″N 079°35′58″W	
MPPD		Captain Justiniano Montenegro Airport	Pedasí	07°32′05″N 080°02′36″W	
MPPH	PYC	Playón Chico Airport	Ailigandí	09°18′25″N 078°14′07″W	
MPPI	BFQ	Piña Airport	Puerto Piña	07°35′29″N 078°10′41″W	
MPPN		Guillermo Palm Airport	Penonomé	08°30′16″N 080°21′38″W	
MPPU		Punta Cocos Airport	La Esmeralda	08°13′30″N 078°54′15″W	
MPRA		Colonel Raúl Arias Espinoza Airport	Saboga	08°37′42″N 079°02′04″W	
MPRE	ELE	El Real Airport	El Real de Santa María	08°06′26″N 077°43′32″W	
MPRG		Captain Reynaldo Guiraud Airport	Santa Fe	08°30′41″N 081°05′19″W	
MPRP		Reserva Punta Patiño Airport	La Palma	08°15′12″N 078°16′41″W	
MPRS		Río Sidra Airport	Narganá	09°25′05″N 078°49′59″W	
MPRZ		Río Azúcar Airport	Narganá	09°25′05″N 078°36′59″W	
MPSA	SYP	Ruben Cantu Airport	Santiago	08°05′10″N 080°56′43″W	
MPSB	SAX	Sambú Airport	Sambú	08°01′35″N 078°12′35″W	
MPSE		Islas Secas Airport	San Lorenzo	07°59′18″N 082°02′00″W	
MPSJ	SIC	Isla San José Airport	Isla San José	08°15′43″N 079°04′39″W	
MPSM	RIH	Scarlett Martínez International Airport (Río Hato Airport)	Rio Hato	08°22′33″N 080°07′40″W	
MPSR		Ingenio Santa Rosa Airport	Aguadulce	08°11′48″N 080°39′31″W	
MPSS		Finca 67 Airport	Changuinola	09°26′03″N 082°29′52″W	
MPTO	PTY	Tocumen International Airport	Panama City	09°04′17″N 079°23′01″W	
MPTU	TUW	Tubualá Airport	Tubualá	08°55′05″N 077°42′59″W	
MPUP	UTU	Ustupo Airport	Ailigandí	09°08′18″N 077°56′02″W	
MPVC		Álvardo Berroa Airport	Volcán	08°46′13″N 082°39′52″W	
MPVR	PVE	El Porvenir Airport	El Porvenir	09°33′30″N 078°56′50″W	
MPWN	NBL	Wannukandi Airport	Wannukandi, Guna Yala	09°16′25″N 078°08′20″W	

== MR - Costa Rica ==
Also see airport category and list.

ICAO	IATA	Airport name	Community	Coordinates	Notes
MRAD		Damas Airport	Parrita	09°27′28″N 084°12′29″W	
MRAF	ACO	Cobano Airport	Cóbano	09°41′32″N 085°05′45″W	
MRAG		Altagracia Airport	Cajón	09°19′58″N 083°34′57″W	
MRAJ		Aranuez Airport	Pitahaya	10°03′23″N 084°48′30″W	
MRAL		Altomonte Airport	El General	09°21′49″N 083°37′34″W	
MRAM		Amubri Airport	Telire	09°31′20″N 082°57′09″W	
MRAN	FON	La Fortuna Arenal Airport	La Fortuna	10°28′09″N 084°34′44″W	
MRAO	TTQ	Barra de Tortuguero Airport	Tortuguero	10°34′02″N 083°30′50″W	
MRAR		Atirro Airport	La Suiza	09°50′37″N 083°39′05″W	
MRAZ		Distrito 3 Gayacara Airport	Guaycará	08°41′00″N 083°06′21″W	
MRBA	BAI	Buenos Aires Airport	Buenos Aires	09°09′46″N 083°19′49″W	
MRBB		Babilonia Airport	Alegría	10°08′00″N 083°35′00″W	Closed
MRBC	BCL	Barra del Colorado Airport	Barra del Colorado	10°46′06″N 083°35′08″W	
MRBN		Batán Airport	Batán	10°05′14″N 083°19′23″W	
MRBO		Boca Naranjo Airport	Quepos	09°25′23″N 084°06′54″W	
MRBP		Barra de Parismina Airport	Reventazón	10°18′09″N 083°20′45″W	
MRBT		Barra de Tortuguero Airport	Colorado	10°34′08″N 083°30′54″W	
MRCA	CSC	Codela Airport	Pocora	10°09′38″N 083°35′35″W	
MRCC	OTR	Coto 47 Airport	Coto 47	08°36′00″N 082°58′02″W	
MRCD		Cangrejo Verde Airport	Laurel	08°30′00″N 082°59′00″W	
MRCE		Carate Airport	Puerto Jiménez	08°26′31″N 083°27′33″W	
MRCH		Chacarita Airport	Chacarita	09°58′53″N 084°46′21″W	
MRCI		Ciruelas Airport	Pijije	10°30′25″N 085°21′19″W	
MRCJ		Cajuela Airport	San Isidro de El General	09°23′20″N 083°41′16″W	
MRCL		Coyolar Airport	Curubandé de Liberia	10°40′04″N 085°30′38″W	
MRCO		El Cerrito Airport	Liberia	10°28′50″N 085°32′00″W	
MRCR	PLD	Carrillo Airport	Puerto Carrillo	09°52′14″N 085°28′52″W	
MRCT		Catsa Airport	Liberia	10°31′09″N 085°33′19″W	
MRCV		Cabo Velas Airport	Playa Grande	10°21′15″N 085°51′14″W	
MRDC		Duacarí 2 Airport	Duacarí	10°21′06″N 083°37′51″W	
MRDK	DRK	Bahía Drake Airport (Drake Bay Airport)	Bahia Drake	08°43′08″N 083°38′30″W	
MRDM		Dos Marías Airport	Paquera	09°55′32″N 084°59′26″W	
MRDO		Dieciocho Airport (military)	Dieciocho	08°54′12″N 083°25′35″W	
MRDV		Dole Venecia Airport	Pital	10°25′18″N 084°16′05″W	
MREA		El Amparo Airport	El Amparo	10°50′59″N 084°39′45″W	
MREC		El Carmen de Siquirres Airport	El Carmen	10°12′06″N 083°28′16″W	
MRED		El Descanso de Pocosol Airport	Pocosol	10°52′08″N 084°31′43″W	
MREJ		El Jaguar Airport	Puerto Jiménez	08°25′06″N 083°21′43″W	
MREL		El Palmar Airport	Pitahaya	10°01′57″N 084°47′52″W	
MREP		El Porvenir Airport	Sardinal	10°30′42″N 085°37′42″W	
MRET		Esterillos Airport	Parrita	09°31′34″N 084°27′16″W	
MRFC		Flying Crocodile Airport	Sámara	09°53′03″N 085°33′56″W	
MRFD		Finca Delicias Airport	Puerto Cortés	08°57′28″N 083°33′01″W	
MRFI		Nuevo Palmar Sur Airport	Nuevo Palmar Sur	08°55′00″N 083°30′25″W	
MRFL		Florencia Airport	Florencia	10°22′54″N 084°29′21″W	
MRFM		Finca Manu Airport	Matama	09°49′39″N 083°03′57″W	
MRFP		Frutex-Pital Airport	Aguas Zarcas	10°26′51″N 084°22′08″W	Closed
MRFS		Finca 63 Airport	Finca 63	08°39′10″N 083°03′57″W	
MRGF	GLF	Golfito Airport	Golfito	08°39′13″N 083°10′53″W	
MRGL		La Gloriosa Airport	Venecia	10°20′11″N 084°15′56″W	
MRGP	GPL	Guápiles Airport	Guápiles	10°13′02″N 083°47′49″W	
MRHM		Hacienda Rancho Monterreal Airport	Liberia	10°32′58″N 085°31′46″W	
MRHP		Hacienda La Pacifica Airport	Cañas	10°27′09″N 085°08′58″W	
MRHR		Hacienda Rosa María Airport	Nacascolo	10°49′24″N 085°37′01″W	
MRIA	PBP	Punta Islita Airport	Corozalito	09°51′22″N 085°22′15″W	
MRIS		Las Islas Airport	Puerto Viejo	10°33′27″N 083°58′18″W	
MRJO		Hacienda Jacó Airport	Garabito Canton	09°33′34″N 084°33′37″W	
MRLA		La Zampoña Airport	Diriá	10°18′34″N 085°29′55″W	
MRLB	LIR	Daniel Oduber Quirós International Airport	Liberia	10°35′42″N 085°32′40″W	
MRLC	LSL	Los Chiles Airport	Los Chiles	11°02′04″N 084°42′23″W	
MRLD		Loma Linda Airport	Naranjo de Alajuela	10°06′37″N 084°23′56″W	Closed
MRLE		Laurel Airport	Laurel	08°26′25″N 082°54′30″W	
MRLF		La Flor Airport	La Flor	10°39′00″N 085°32′05″W	
MRLI		La Ligia Airport	Parrita	09°30′32″N 084°20′00″W	
MRLJ		La Javilla Airport	Bejuco	09°48′41″N 085°17′40″W	
MRLM	LIO	Limón International Airport	Limón	09°57′28″N 083°01′22″W	
MRLN		La Guinea Airport	Filadelfia de Guanacaste	10°25′18″N 085°28′17″W	
MRLP	LSP	Las Piedras Airport	Cañas	10°21′20″N 085°12′17″W	
MRLR		La Roca Airport	San Miguel	10°20′43″N 085°06′18″W	
MRLT		Las Trancas Airport	Las Trancas, Guanacaste	11°00′22″N 085°11′06″W	
MRLV		La Cueva Airport	Cañas Dulces	10°40′53″N 085°31′37″W	
MRLY		La Yolanda Airport	Jacó	09°32′54″N 084°33′11″W	
MRMA		Montealto Airport	Mansión	10°04′40″N 085°16′14″W	
MRMC		Murciélago Airport	Santa Elena	10°54′37″N 085°43′08″W	
MRMJ		Mojica Airport	Bagaces	10°24′59″N 085°11′02″W	
MRMO		Moravia de Chirripó Airport	Chirripó	09°49′57″N 083°26′28″W	
MRMR		Monte Reina Airport	Sámara	09°53′58″N 085°33′02″W	
MRNC	NCT	Nicoya Guanacaste Airport	Nicoya	10°08′21″N 085°26′44″W	
MRNI		La Bonita Airport	Daniel Flores	09°23′22″N 083°40′40″W	
MRNS	NOB	Nosara Airport	Nosara	09°58′34″N 085°39′10″W	
MROC	SJO	Juan Santamaría International Airport	San José	09°59′35″N 084°12′33″W	
MRPA		Palo Arco Airport	Palo Arco	09°51′07″N 085°14′15″W	
MRPD		Pandora Airport	Pandora	09°43′56″N 082°59′00″W	
MRPJ	PJM	Puerto Jiménez Airport	Puerto Jimenez	08°32′07″N 083°18′04″W	
MRPK		Papa Kilo Airport	Bahía Ballena	09°09′49″N 083°44′08″W	
MRPM	PMZ	Palmar Sur Airport	Palmar Sur	08°57′01″N 083°28′06″W	
MRPN		Pelón Nuevo Airport	Liberia	10°29′08″N 085°25′04″W	
MRPQ		Pillique Airport	Filadelfia de Guanacaste	10°27′10″N 085°33′37″W	
MRPR		Playón Sur Airport	Parrita	09°34′43″N 084°20′40″W	
MRPS		Granos de Oro Airport	Cartagena	10°18′54″N 085°40′33″W	
MRPT		Playa Caletas Agricultural Airport	Bejuco	09°45′01″N 085°15′02″W	
MRPV	SYQ	Tobías Bolaños International Airport	San José	09°57′27″N 084°08′19″W	
MRPY		Playa Ballena Airport	Bahía Ballena	09°07′22″N 083°42′17″W	
MRQA		Quebrada Azul Airport	Florencia	10°24′46″N 084°29′12″W	
MRQP	XQP	Quepos La Managua Airport	Quepos	09°26′34″N 084°07′47″W	
MRRA		Harry Both Airport	Veintisiete de Abril	10°11′07″N 085°48′58″W	
MRRF	RFR	Rio Frio Airport	Rio Frio / Progreso	10°19′30″N 083°53′14″W	
MRRH		Rancho Humo Airport	San Antonio	10°18′50″N 085°20′41″W	
MRRX		Roxana Farms Airport	Rita	10°18′33″N 083°45′27″W	
MRSA		San Alberto Airport	Siquirres	10°08′53″N 083°29′30″W	
MRSC		Codela San Carlos Airport	Aguas Zarcas	10°27′36″N 084°20′52″W	
MRSG		Santa Clara de Guapiles Airport	Humo	10°17′17″N 083°42′47″W	
MRSH		Shiroles Airport	Bratsi	09°35′12″N 082°57′28″W	
MRSI		San Isidro de El General Airport	San Isidro de El General	09°20′55″N 083°42′45″W	
MRSL		Salama Airport	Salama	10°18′14″N 085°26′25″W	
MRSN		Sirena Aerodrome	Corcovado National Park	08°28′40″N 083°35′30″W	
MRSO		Santa Maria de Guacimo Airport	Santa Maria de Guacimo	10°16′15″N 083°35′00″W	
MRSQ		Sarapiquí Airport	Puerto Viejo	10°28′16″N 083°54′26″W	
MRSS		Somosaguas Airport	Brunka	09°14′08″N 083°23′39″W	
MRST		San Agustín Airport	Chomes	10°03′56″N 084°52′35″W	
MRSV	TOO	San Vito de Java Airport	San Vito	08°49′37″N 082°57′32″W	
MRSX		Sixaola Airport	Sixaola	09°30′14″N 082°37′53″W	
MRTA		Tico Wings Airport	Tamarindo	10°20′08″N 085°47′56″W	
MRTB		Ticabán Airport	Rita	10°23′46″N 083°49′46″W	
MRTG		Taboga Airport	Bebedero	10°22′00″N 085°09′59″W	
MRTL		Talolinga Airport	San Antonio	10°18′35″N 085°28′01″W	
MRTM	TNO	Tamarindo Airport	Tamarindo	10°18′56″N 085°48′44″W	
MRTR	TMU	Tambor Airport	Tambor	09°44′21″N 085°00′58″W	
MRTS		Santa Teresa Airport	Santa Teresa	09°41′25″N 085°10′58″W	
MRTY		Tranquility Seaplane Base	Puerto Jiménez	08°30′04″N 083°17′45″W	
MRUP	UPL	Upala Airport	Upala	10°53′31″N 085°00′58″W	
MRYT		Yucatica Piñera Parismina Airport	Roxana	10°20′19″N 083°40′12″W	

== MS - El Salvador ==
Also see airport category and list.

ICAO	IATA	Airport name	Community	Coordinates	Notes
MSAC		La Aramuaca Airport	San Miguel	13°26′53″N 088°07′12″W	
MSBS		Barrillas Airport	Usulután	13°15′55″N 088°29′55″W	
MSCD		Ceiba Doblada Airport	Ceiba Doblada	13°12′47″N 088°36′10″W	
MSCH		La Chepona Airport	La Chepona	13°11′10″N 088°24′24″W	
MSCM		Corral de Mulas Airport	Corral de Mulas	13°12′20″N 088°32′50″W	
MSCN		Casas Nuevas Airport	Jiquilisco	13°18′35″N 088°30′25″W	
MSCR		La Carrera Airport	Jiquilisco	13°19′45″N 088°31′15″W	
MSCS		Las Cachas Airport	Cangrejera	13°28′00″N 089°11′29″W	
MSEJ		El Jocotillo Airport	Acajutla	13°34′45″N 089°44′01″W	
MSES		Espiritu Santo Airport	Espiritu Santo	13°13′10″N 088°33′15″W	
MSET		El Jagüey Airfield	El Tamarindo	13°09′45″N 087°54′17″W	
MSJC		El Jocotillo Airport	Acajutla	13°34′45″N 089°44′01″W	
MSLC		La Cabaña Airport	La Cabaña	14°00′35″N 089°11′05″W	
MSLD		Los Comandos Airport	San Francisco Gotera	13°43′35″N 088°06′25″W	
MSLM		Las Mesas Airport	Panchimalco	13°29′13″N 089°11′34″W	
MSLP	SAL	El Salvador International Airport (San Óscar Arnulfo Romero y Galdámez International)	San Salvador	13°26′27″N 089°03′20″W	
MSPT		El Platanar Airport	El Platanar	13°35′13″N 088°17′50″W	
MSRC		El Ronco Airport	El Ronco	14°19′07″N 089°30′25″W	Closed
MSSA		El Palmer Airport	Santa Ana	13°58′21″N 089°34′14″W	Closed
MSSJ		Punta San Juan Airport	Corral de Mulas	13°10′40″N 088°28′25″W	
MSSM		El Papalon Airport	San Miguel	13°26′40″N 088°07′40″W	
MSSN		San Ramon Airport	La Unión	13°11′51″N 087°57′39″W	
MSSS	ILS	Ilopango International Airport	San Salvador	13°41′30″N 089°07′32″W	
MSZT		El Zapote Airport	El Zapote	13°42′29″N 090°01′35″W	

== MT - Haiti ==
Also see airport category and list.

ICAO	IATA	Airport name	Community	Coordinates
MTCA	CYA	Antoine Simon Airport	Les Cayes	18°16′16″N 073°47′18″W
MTCH	CAP	Cap-Haïtien International Airport	Cap-Haïtien	19°43′59″N 072°11′41″W
MTJA	JAK	Jacmel Airport	Jacmel	18°14′28″N 072°31′07″W
MTJE	JEE	Jérémie Airport	Jérémie	18°39′48″N 074°10′20″W
MTPP	PAP	Toussaint Louverture International Airport	Port-au-Prince	18°34′31″N 072°17′42″W
MTPX	PAX	Port-de-Paix Airport	Port-de-Paix	19°56′05″N 072°50′50″W

== MU - Cuba ==
Also see airport category and list.

ICAO	IATA	Airport name	Community	Coordinates	Notes
MUBA	BCA	Gustavo Rizo Airport	Baracoa, Guantánamo	20°21′55″N 074°30′22″W	
MUBR		Las Brujas Airport	Cayo Santa Maria, Villa Clara	22°37′16″N 079°08′50″W	
MUBY	BYM	Carlos Manuel de Céspedes Airport	Bayamo, Granma	20°23′47″N 076°37′17″W	
MUCA	AVI	Máximo Gómez Airport	Ciego de Ávila, Ciego de Ávila	22°01′37″N 078°47′22″W	
MUCB		Caibarién Airport	Caibarién, Villa Clara	22°30′23″N 079°28′11″W	Closed
MUCC	CCC	Jardines del Rey Airport	Cayo Coco, Ciego de Ávila	22°27′40″N 078°19′43″W	
MUCF	CFG	Jaime González Airport	Cienfuegos, Cienfuegos	22°09′00″N 080°23′51″W	
MUCL	CYO	Vilo Acuña Airport (Juan Vitalio Acuña Airport)	Cayo Largo del Sur, Isla de la Juventud	21°36′58″N 081°32′44″W	
MUCM	CMW	Ignacio Agramonte International Airport	Camagüey, Camagüey	21°25′13″N 077°50′51″W	
MUCO		Colón Airport	Colón, Matanzas	22°42′40″N 080°55′22″W	
MUCU	SCU	Antonio Maceo Airport	Santiago de Cuba, Santiago de Cuba	19°58′12″N 075°50′08″W	
MUFL		Florida Airport	Florida, Camagüey	21°29′59″N 078°12′10″W	
MUGM	NBW	Leeward Point Field (US Naval Station Guantanamo Bay)	Guantánamo Bay, Guantánamo	19°54′23″N 075°12′25″W	United States Military
MUGT	GAO	Mariana Grajales Airport	Guantánamo, Guantánamo	20°05′07″N 075°09′29″W	
MUGV		Guardalavaca Airport	Guardalavaca, Holguín	21°06′40″N 075°49′20″W	
MUHA	HAV	José Martí International Airport (Rancho-Boyeros Airport)	Havana, Havana (La Habana)	22°59′21″N 082°24′33″W	
MUHG	HOG	Frank País Airport	Holguín, Holguín	20°46′44″N 076°18′44″W	
MUKW	VRO	Kawama Airport	Varadero, Matanzas	23°07′25″N 081°18′07″W	
MULB		Ciudad Libertad Airport	Havana, Havana (La Habana)	23°05′38″N 082°26′17″W	Military
MULM	LCL	La Coloma Airport	Pinar del Río, Pinar del Río	22°20′11″N 083°38′32″W	
MUMA	UMA	Punta de Maisí Airport	Maisí, Guantánamo	20°14′35″N 074°08′50″W	
MUMG		Managua Airport	Managua; Havana	22°58′12″N 082°16′30″W	Military
MUML		Mariel Airport	Mariel, Havana (La Habana)	23°00′26″N 082°46′03″W	Closed
MUMO	MOA	Orestes Acosta Airport	Moa, Holguín	20°39′14″N 074°55′20″W	
MUMZ	MZO	Sierra Maestra Airport	Manzanillo, Granma	20°17′20″N 077°05′12″W	
MUNB	QSN	San Nicolás de Bari Airport	San Nicolás de Bari, Havana (La Habana)	22°45′23″N 081°55′15″W	
MUNC	ICR	Nicaro Airport	Nicaro	20°41′19″N 075°31′53″W	Closed
MUNG	GER	Rafael Cabrera Mustelier Airport	Nueva Gerona, Isla de la Juventud	21°50′05″N 082°47′02″W	
MUOC		Cayo Coco Airport	Cayo Coco, Ciego de Ávila	22°30′58″N 078°30′32″W	Closed
MUPB	UPB	Playa Baracoa Airport	Havana, Havana (La Habana)	23°01′58″N 082°34′46″W	Military
MUPR	QPD	Pinar del Río Airport	Pinar del Río, Pinar del Río	22°25′17″N 083°40′42″W	Closed
MUSA		San Antonio de los Baños Air Base	San Antonio de los Baños, Havana (La Habana)	22°52′18″N 082°30′34″W	
MUSC	SNU	Abel Santamaría Airport	Santa Clara, Villa Clara	22°29′32″N 079°56′37″W	
MUSJ	SNJ	San Julian Air Base	Pinar del Río, Pinar del Río	22°05′43″N 084°09′07″W	
MUSL		Joaquín de Agüero Airport (Santa Lucia Airport)	Santa Lucia, Camagüey	21°30′34″N 077°01′13″W	
MUSN	SZJ	Siguanea Airport	Isla de la Juventud	21°38′33″N 082°57′18″W	
MUSS	USS	Sancti Spíritus Airport	Sancti Spíritus, Sancti Spíritus	21°58′12″N 079°26′34″W	
MUTD	TND	Alberto Delgado Airport	Trinidad, Sancti Spíritus	21°47′18″N 079°59′50″W	
MUVR	VRA	Juan Gualberto Gómez Airport	Varadero, Matanzas	23°02′04″N 081°26′07″W	
MUVT	VTU	Hermanos Ameijeiras Airport	Victoria de Las Tunas, Las Tunas	20°59′16″N 076°56′09″W	

== MW - Cayman Islands ==
Also see airport category and list.

ICAO	IATA	Airport name	Community	Coordinates	Notes
MWCB	CYB	Sir Charles Kirkconnell International Airport	Cayman Brac	19°41′13″N 079°52′58″W	
MWCC		Ritz Carlton Heliport	George Town, Grand Cayman	19°20′09″N 081°22′37″W	
MWCD		Camana Bay Heliport	George Town, Grand Cayman	19°19′17″N 081°22′31″W	
MWCF		Frank Sound Airfield	George Town, Grand Cayman	19°18′02″N 081°11′35″W	Closed
MWCG		George Town Heliport (Metropolitan Area)	George Town, Grand Cayman	19°18′11″N 081°22′59″W	
MWCL	LYB	Edward Bodden Airfield (Little Cayman Airport)	Little Cayman	19°39′36″N 080°05′20″W	
MWCR	GCM	Owen Roberts International Airport	George Town, Grand Cayman	19°17′33″N 081°21′33″W	
MWCW		Windmill Hill Heliport	Old Man Bay, Grand Cayman	19°20′55″N 081°08′47″W	

== MY - Bahamas ==
Also see airport category and list.

ICAO	IATA	Airport name	Community	Coordinates	Notes
MYAF	ASD	Andros Town International Airport (Fresh Creek Airport)	Andros Town, Andros	24°41′53″N 077°47′44″W	
MYAG		Castaway Cay Airport	Castaway Cay (Gorda Cay), Abaco	26°05′26″N 077°32′24″W	Private
MYAK	TZN	South Andros Airport (Congo Town Airport)	Congo Town, Andros	24°09′32″N 077°35′23″W	
MYAM	MHH	Leonard M. Thompson International Airport	Marsh Harbour, Abaco	26°30′41″N 077°05′01″W	
MYAN	SAQ	San Andros Airport	Nicholls Town, Andros	25°03′14″N 078°02′57″W	
MYAO		Mores Island Airport (Moores Island Airport)	Moore's Island, Abaco	26°19′05″N 077°33′44″W	
MYAP	AXP	Spring Point Airport	Spring Point, Acklins	22°26′31″N 073°58′15″W	
MYAS		Sandy Point Airport	Sandy Point, Abaco	26°00′17″N 077°23′44″W	
MYAT	TCB	Treasure Cay Airport	Treasure Cay, Abaco	26°44′43″N 077°23′28″W	
MYAW	WKR	Walker's Cay Airport	Walker's Cay, Abaco	27°15′38″N 078°24′08″W	
MYAX		Spanish Cay Airport	Spanish Cay, Abaco	26°57′01″N 077°32′38″W	
MYBC	CCZ	Chub Cay International Airport	Chub Cay, Berry Islands	25°25′02″N 077°52′51″W	
MYBG	GHC	Great Harbour Cay Airport	Great Harbour Cay, Berry Islands	25°44′18″N 077°50′25″W	
MYBO		Ocean Cay Airport	Ocean Cay, Bimini	25°25′23″N 079°12′34″W	Private
MYBS	BIM	South Bimini Airport	South Bimini, Bimini	25°42′00″N 079°15′55″W	
MYBT		Cistern Field	Cistern Cay, Berry Islands	25°46′47″N 077°53′08″W	
MYBW		Big Whale Cay Airport	Big Whale Cay, Berry Islands	25°24′07″N 077°47′18″W	
MYBX		Little Whale Cay Airport	Little Whale Cay, Berry Islands	25°26′59″N 077°45′34″W	Private
MYCA	ATC	Arthur's Town Airport	Arthur's Town, Cat Island	24°37′47″N 075°40′28″W	
MYCB	TBI	New Bight Airport	New Bight, Cat Island	24°18′55″N 075°27′09″W	
MYCC		Cat Cay Airport	North Cat Cay, Bimini	25°33′19″N 079°16′34″W	Private
MYCH		Hawks Nest Airport (Hawk's Nest Creek Airport)	Hawks Nest, Cat Island	24°09′15″N 075°31′13″W	
MYCI	CRI	Colonel Hill Airport (Crooked Island Airport)	Colonel Hill, Crooked Island	22°44′43″N 074°10′57″W	
MYCP		Pitts Town Airport (Pitts Town Point Airport)	Pitts Town, Crooked Island	22°49′47″N 074°20′47″W	
MYCS		Cay Sal Airport	Cay Sal	23°41′34″N 080°23′15″W	Private
MYCX		Cutlass Bay Airport	Cutlass Bay, Cat Island	24°08′57″N 075°23′53″W	
MYCZ		Autec Heliport	Andros Town, North Andros, Andros	24°42′34″N 077°46′22″W	
MYEB		Black Point Airport	Black Point, Exuma	24°05′21″N 076°23′53″W	
MYEC	CEL	Cape Eleuthera Airport	Cape Eleuthera, Eleuthera	24°47′25″N 076°17′41″W	Closed
MYEF	GGT	Exuma International Airport	Moss Town, Exuma	23°33′45″N 075°52′39″W	
MYEG		George Town Airport	George Town, Exuma	23°28′00″N 075°46′54″W	Closed
MYEH	ELH	North Eleuthera Airport	North Eleuthera, Eleuthera	25°28′32″N 076°40′53″W	
MYEL		Lee Stocking Airport	Lee Stocking, Exuma	23°46′32″N 076°06′13″W	
MYEM	GHB	Governor's Harbour Airport	Governor's Harbour, Eleuthera	25°17′05″N 076°19′52″W	
MYEN	NMC	Norman's Cay Airport	Norman's Cay, Exuma	24°35′40″N 076°49′12″W	
MYER	RSD	Rock Sound International Airport	Rock Sound, Eleuthera	24°53′42″N 076°10′35″W	
MYES	TYM	Staniel Cay Airport	Staniel Cay, Exuma	24°10′11″N 076°26′21″W	
MYGD		Deep Water Cay Airport	Deep Water Cay, Grand Bahama	26°37′57″N 077°55′19″W	
MYGF	FPO	Grand Bahama International Airport (Freeport International Airport)	Freeport, Grand Bahama	26°33′32″N 078°41′44″W	
MYGM		Grand Bahama Aux AF Airport	High Rock, Grand Bahama	26°37′55″N 078°21′35″W	
MYGW	WTD	West End Airport	West End, Grand Bahama	26°41′12″N 078°58′44″W	
MYIG	IGA	Inagua Airport (Matthew Town Airport)	Matthew Town, Inagua	20°58′30″N 073°40′01″W	
MYLD	LGI	Deadman's Cay Airport	Deadman's Cay, Long Island	23°10′43″N 075°05′37″W	
MYLM		Cape Santa Maria Airport	Cape Santa Maria, Long Island	23°38′56″N 075°19′24″W	Closed
MYLR		Hard Bargain Airport	Long Island	23°00′40″N 074°54′21″W	
MYLS	SML	Stella Maris Airport	Stella Maris, Long Island	23°34′59″N 075°16′08″W	
MYMM	MYG	Mayaguana Airport	Mayaguana	22°22′50″N 073°00′40″W	
MYNN	NAS	Lynden Pindling International Airport (formerly Nassau International Airport)	Nassau, New Providence	25°02′10″N 077°28′08″W	
MYPI	PID	New Providence Airport	Paradise Island, New Providence	25°04′45″N 077°17′36″W	Closed
MYRD	DCT	Duncan Town Airport	Duncan Town, Ragged Island	22°10′55″N 075°43′46″W	
MYRP		Port Nelson Airport	Port Nelson, Rum Cay	23°41′00″N 074°50′11″W	
MYSM	ZSA	San Salvador Airport (Cockburn Town Airport)	Cockburn Town, San Salvador Island	24°03′47″N 074°31′25″W	
MYTC		Torch Cay Airport	Torch Cay, Exuma	23°23′51″N 075°29′50″W	
MYXA		Fowl Cay Airport	Fowl Cay, Exuma	24°16′15″N 076°32′28″W	
MYXC		Hog Cay Airport	Hog Cay, Long Island	23°36′04″N 075°20′21″W	
MYXD		Leaf Cay Airport	Leaf Cay, Exuma	24°08′58″N 076°28′23″W	
MYXF		Little Darby Island Airport	Little Darby Island, Exuma	23°51′29″N 076°13′23″W	
MYXH		Sampson Cay Airport	Sampson Cay, Exuma	24°12′59″N 076°28′43″W	
MYXI		Scotland Cay Airport	Scotland Cay, Abaco Islands	26°38′31″N 077°04′03″W	

== MZ - Belize ==
Also see airport category and list.

ICAO	IATA	Airport name	Community	Coordinates	Notes
MZAM		H.E. Alfredo Martinez Airstrip	Chan Pine Ridge	18°02′49″N 088°35′02″W	
MZBA		Belize Aquaculture Airstrip	Santa Cruz	16°39′09″N 088°22′15″W	
MZBB		Blackbird Caye Airstrip	Turneffe Atoll	17°19′08″N 087°47′52″W	
MZBE	TZA	Sir Barry Bowen Municipal Airport	Belize City	17°31′00″N 088°11′41″W	
MZBG	BGK	Big Creek Airport	Big Creek	16°31′13″N 088°24′36″W	
MZBL		Blue Creek Agricultural Airstrip	Blue Creek	17°54′07″N 088°59′13″W	
MZBP	BCV	Hector Silva Airstrip	Belmopan	17°16′10″N 088°46′34″W	
MZBZ	BZE	Philip S. W. Goldson International Airport	Belize City	17°32′58″N 088°17′31″W	
MZCF	SQS	Matthew Spain Airport	San Ignacio	17°11′09″N 089°00′35″W	
MZCK	CUK	Caye Caulker Airport	Caye Caulker	17°44′06″N 088°01′58″W	
MZCP	CYC	Caye Chapel Airport	Caye Chapel	17°41′02″N 088°02′42″W	
MZCS		Cisco Heliport	Belize City	17°29′47″N 088°14′05″W	
MZCZ	CZH	Corozal Airport (Ranchito Airport)	Corozal	18°22′54″N 088°24′42″W	
MZGC		Grand Caribe Heliport	San Pedro Town	17°56′47″N 087°56′45″W	
MZGJ		Chan Chich Airstrip	Gallon Jug	17°34′00″N 089°03′00″W	
MZGP		Grand Caribe Hospital Heliport	San Pedro Town	17°56′52″N 087°56′37″W	
MZHB		Hill Bank Airstrip	Indian Creek Colony	17°41′42″N 088°42′15″W	
MZHD		Hidden Valley Airstrip	Hidden Valley	17°03′48″N 088°51′45″W	
MZJC		Johnny Chan Chen Airstrip	Chan Chen	18°26′26″N 088°27′12″W	Closed
MZJW		Cisco Farm Airstrip	Santa Marta	17°04′08″N 088°35′36″W	
MZKT	SVK	Silver Creek Airport	Silver Creek	16°43′42″N 088°22′09″W	
MZLA		Lamanai Airstrip	Indian Church	17°44′43″N 088°39′29″W	
MZLH		Northern Two Cayes Airstrip	Northern Caye	17°27′13″N 087°29′53″W	
MZMF	CYD	San Ignacio Town Airstrip (Maya Flats Airport)	San Ignacio	17°06′18″N 089°06′04″W	
MZML	MDB	Melinda Airport	Hope Creek	17°00′09″N 088°18′05″W	Emergency use only
MZPB	DGA	Dangriga Airport (Pelican Beach Airstrip)	Dangriga	16°58′57″N 088°13′50″W	
MZPG	PND	Punta Gorda Airport	Punta Gorda	16°06′08″N 088°48′29″W	
MZPL	PLJ	Placencia Airport	Placencia	16°32′13″N 088°21′42″W	
MZPR		Privassion Airport	Privassion Enclave	17°02′20″N 088°57′17″W	
MZRD		Rio Dorado Airstrip	Indian Creek, Toledo	16°18′42″N 088°49′34″W	
MZRS		Royal Shrimp Farm Airstrip	George Town, Stann Creek	16°35′58″N 088°25′24″W	
MZSJ	SJX	Sarteneja Airport	Sarteneja	18°21′21″N 088°07′51″W	
MZSL	MZE	Manatee Airport (Spanish Lookout Airport)	Spanish Lookout	17°16′42″N 089°01′26″W	
MZSP	SPR	John Greif II Airport	San Pedro	17°54′50″N 087°58′16″W	
MZSV	INB	Independence Airport (Mango Creek Airport/Savannah Airport)	Independence and Mango Creek	16°32′04″N 088°26′29″W	
MZTH	ORZ	Alfredo Martinez Chan Pine Ridge Airstrip (Tower Hill Airport)	Orange Walk Town	18°02′49″N 088°35′03″W	
