= Santa Lucia Airport (disambiguation) =

Santa Lucia Airport refers to Felipe Ángeles International Airport (IATA: NLU), near Mexico City.

Santa Lucia Airport may also refer to:

- Hewanorra International Airport (IATA: UVF, ICAO: TLPL), near Vieux Fort, Saint Lucia
- Joaquín de Agüero Airport (ICAO: MUSL) near Santa Lucia, Camagüey province, Cuba
- Santa Lucía Airport (Chile), in Santa Lucía, Chile
