= Nueva Concepción, Escuintla =

Nueva Concepción
- Municipality and town
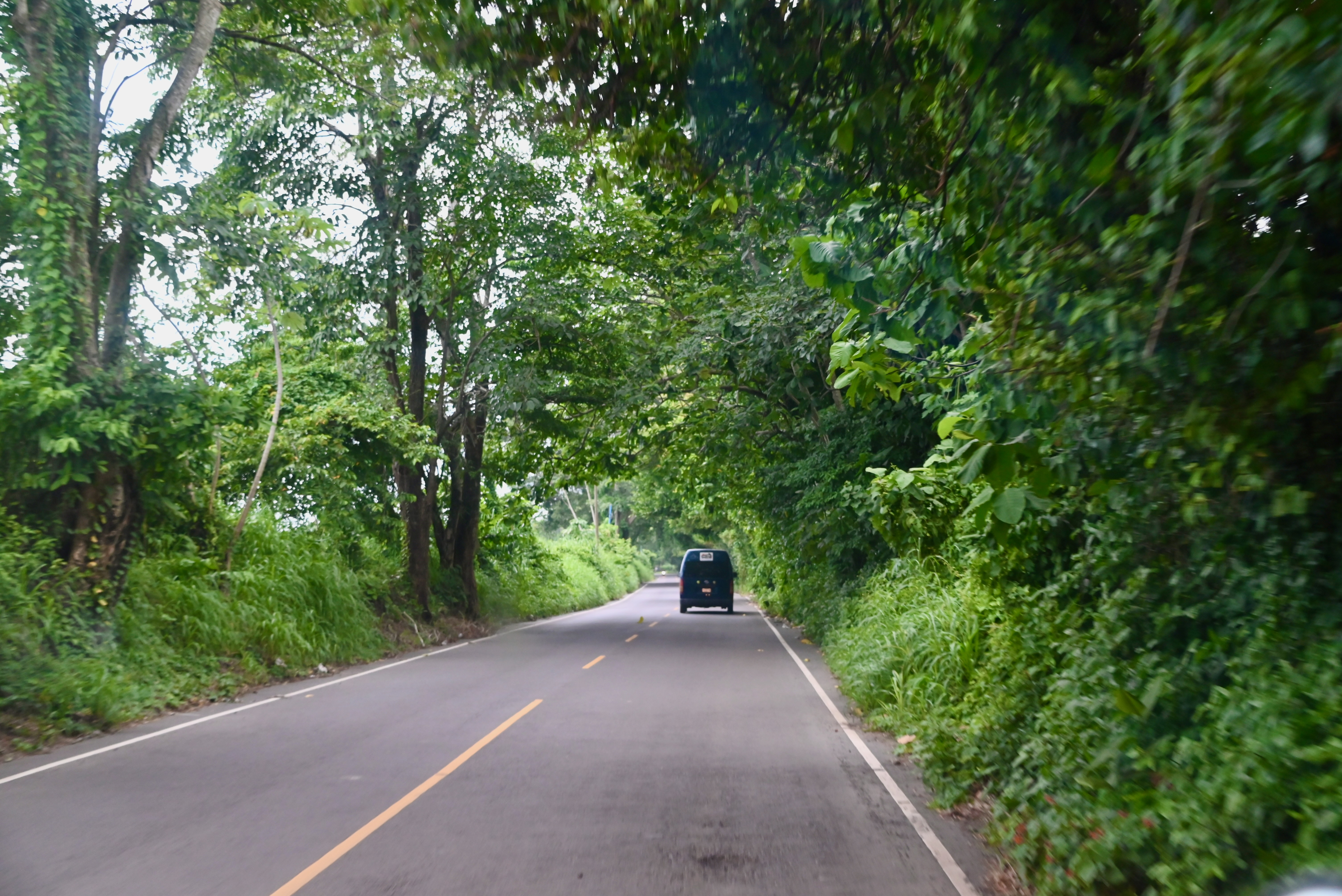

- Location in Guatemala
- Coordinates: 14°11′59″N 91°17′59″W
- Country: Guatemala
- Department: Escuintla

Area
  - Total: 215.6 sq mi (558.4 km^{2})

Population (2023)
  - Total: 83,170
  - Density: 385.8/sq mi (148.9/km^{2})
- Climate: Aw

Nueva Concepción (Spanish pronunciation: [ˈnweβa konseβˈsjon]) is a city and a municipality in the Escuintla department of Guatemala. It covers an area of approximately 558.4 km^{2} (215.6 sq mi). As per 2023 estimates, it has a population of about 83,170 inhabitants.

== History ==
Nueva Concepción was earlier part of the municipality of Santa Ana Mixtán, which was merged Tiquisate on 5 March 1947. The town was designed and established during the reign of Carlos Castillo Armas in 1956, and was planned by Jacobo Arbenz Guzmán. It was one of the municipalities that was created by the government decree on 15 February 1974, and became effective from 21 May of the same year.

== Geography ==
Nueva Concepción is a municipality in the Escuintla Department in Guatemala. It is spread over an area of 558.4 km^{2} (215.6 sq mi). It lies in the northern part of the department, about 93 km (58 mi) from the departmental capital of Escuintla and 150 km (93 mi) from the national capital of Guatemala city. It borders the municipalities of Patulul to the north, La Gomera to the east, Tiquisate to the west, and Pacific Ocean to the south.

Located at an elevation of 55.3 m (181 ft) above sea level, Nueva Concepción has a tropical monsoon climate (Köppen climate classification: Am). The municipality has an average annual temperature of 25.8 °C (78.4 °F), and receives about 122.13 mm (4.808 in) of rainfall annually.

== Demographics ==
The municipality had an estimated population of 83,170 inhabitants in 2023. The population consisted of 42,217 males and 40,953 females. About 29.5% of the population was below the age of fourteen, and 5.8% was over the age of 65 years. Majority of the population (78.4%) was classified as urban, while 21.6% lived in rural areas. About 81.8% of the inhabitants were born in the same municipality. Ladinos (98.0%) formed the major ethnic group, with Maya (1.7%) forming a small minority. The municipality had a literacy rate of 83.6%, and Spanish (98.5%) was the most spoken language.
