= Brus Laguna Airport =

- IATA: BHG; ICAO: MHBL

Summary
- Airport type: Public
- Serves: Brus Laguna
- Elevation AMSL: 19 ft / 6 m
- Coordinates: 15°45′45″N 84°32′35″W

Map
- Location of the airport in Honduras

Runways
Direction	Length		Surface
Direction	m	ft	Surface
14/32	700	2,297	Grass
- Sources: GCM Google Maps

Brus Laguna Airport (IATA: BHG, ICAO: MHBL) is an airstrip serving the town of Brus Laguna in Gracias a Dios Department, Honduras. The runway is just south of the town.

== See also ==
- Transport in Honduras
- List of airports in Honduras
- Talk:Brus Laguna Airport
