= San Miguel Field =

- IATA: none; ICAO: MDSM

Summary
- Airport type: Public
- Location: Cotuí, Dominican Republic
- Elevation AMSL: 429 ft / 131 m
- Coordinates: 19.05°N 70.15°W

Map

Runways
Direction	Length		Surface
Direction	ft	m	Surface
	155	47	Unpaved

San Miguel Field is located in Cotuí, the capital of the Sánchez Ramírez province in the Dominican Republic. It serves as a simple runway only for emergency landings and to support other operations at Angelina Airport.
