= Ingenio Quisqueya Field =

Ing. Quisqueya Airport
- IATA: none; ICAO: MDIG

Summary
- Airport type: Aerodrome
- Location: San Pedro de Macorís
- Elevation AMSL: 324 ft / 39 m
- Coordinates: 18°33′03″N 69°23′54″W
- Interactive map of Ing. Quisqueya Airport

Runways
Direction	Length		Surface
Direction	ft	m	Surface
	900	155	Asphalt

Ingenio Quisqueya Airport is located in Quisqueya, San Pedro de Macorís, Dominican Republic. Another runway in San Pedro, it is utilized for private and sport aviation. When it was inaugurated, it served as a cargo airport for the Ingenio Quisqueya, hence the name.

== See also ==
- Cueva Las Maravillas Airport

== Sources ==
- Airports DR
