= Mocorón =

- Village
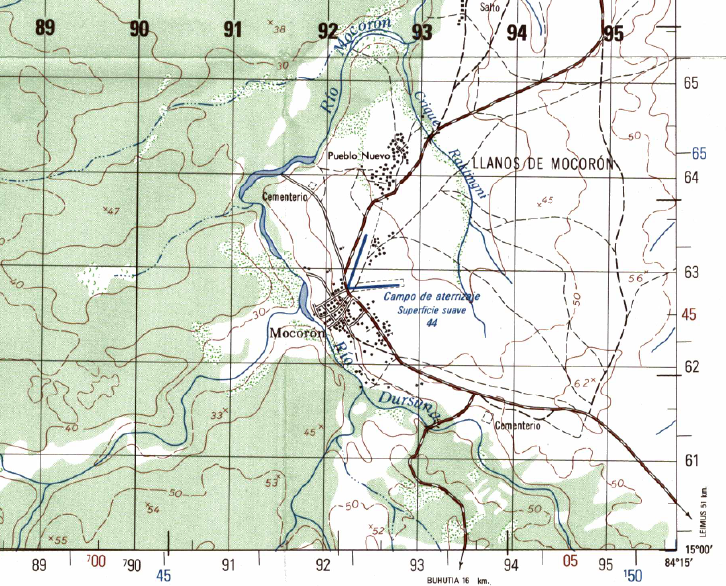
- 1988 US Defense Mapping Agency map showing location of village

- Location in Honduras
- Coordinates: 15°1′30.864″N 84°16′49.4040″W
- Country: Honduras
- Department: Gracias a Dios
- Time zone: UTC−6 (Central America)
- Climate: Af

Mocorón is a remote village in the Puerto Lempira municipality of the Gracias a Dios Department in northeastern Honduras. It is located near the confluence of the Mocorón River and the Rio Dursuna stream. The Mocorón Airport is nearby.

In 1981 the village became a refugee camp for Miskito refugees from Nicaragua.
