= Puerto Jiménez Airport =

- IATA: PJM; ICAO: MRPJ

Summary
- Airport type: Public
- Owner: DGAC
- Location: Puerto Jiménez, Costa Rica
- Elevation AMSL: 7 ft / 2 m
- Coordinates: 8°32′10″N 83°18′05″W

Map
- Location in Costa Rica

Runways
Direction	Length		Surface
Direction	m	ft	Surface
16/34	822	2,697	Asphalt

Statistics (2014)
- Passengers: 35,745
- Passenger change 13–14: ▲34.3%
- Source: AIP GCM SkyVector

Puerto Jiménez Airport (IATA: PJM, ICAO: MRPJ) is an airport serving Puerto Jiménez, a Gulf of Dulce coastal town in Puntarenas Province, Costa Rica. The airport is just east of the town. It is owned and managed by the country's Directorate General of Civil Aviation (DGAC).

Given the distance between Puerto Jiménez and the capital city of San José, the airport is the first choice for tourists traveling to Corcovado National Park and Golfo Dulce.

== Airlines and destinations ==
Airlines	Destinations
Aerobell Airlines	San José–Tobías Bolaños
Sansa Airlines	Drake Bay, San José–Juan Santamaría

== Passenger Statistics ==
As of 2014, Puerto Jiménez Airport is the third-busiest airport in Costa Rica by passenger traffic and the busiest domestic-only airport. These data show number of passengers movements into the airport, according to the Directorate General of Civil Aviation of Costa Rica's Statistical Yearbooks.

Year	2008	2009	2010	2011	2012	2013	2014	2015
Passengers	32,083	27,374	28,084	27,152	27,488	26,608	35,745	T.B.A.
Growth (%)	▼4.65%	▼14.68%	▲2.59%	▼3.32%	▲1.24%	▼3.20%	▲34.34%	T.B.A.
Source: Costa Rica's Directorate General of Civil Aviation (DGAC). Statistical Yearbooks (Years 2008, 2009, 2010, 2011, 2012, 2013, and 2014)

Year	2000	2001	2002	2003	2004	2005	2006	2007
Passengers	8,166	16,374	14,404	19,646	27,086	24,191	23,028	33,646
Growth (%)	N.A.	▲100.51%	▼12.01%	▲36.39%	▲37.87%	▼10.69%	▼4.81%	▲46.11%
Source: Costa Rica's Directorate General of Civil Aviation (DGAC). Statistical Yearbooks (Years 2000-2005, 2006, and 2007,)

== See also ==
- Transport in Costa Rica
- List of airports in Costa Rica
- Carate Airport
