= Wampusirpi =

- Municipality
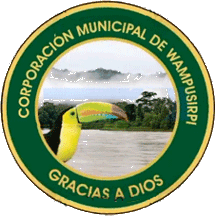
- Seal

- Location in Honduras
- Coordinates: 15°11′N 84°37′W
- Country: Honduras
- Department: Gracias a Dios
- Villages: 5

Area
  - Total: 2,519.06 km^{2} (972.61 sq mi)
- Elevation: 95 m (312 ft)

Population (2015)
  - Total: 5,829
  - Density: 2.314/km^{2} (5.993/sq mi)
- Time zone: UTC-6 (Central America)

Wampusirpi (Spanish pronunciation: [wampuˈsiɾpi]) is a municipality in the Honduran department of Gracias a Dios.

The municipality has 26 different localities with the largest being Wampusirpi, which is also the municipal head.

== Geography ==
The municipality is located west of the capital city of Puerto Lempira, sharing borders with Ahuas to the north, Gualaco to the west and sharing an international border with Nicaragua to the south.

== Demographics ==
At the time of the 2013 Honduras census, Wampusirpi municipality had a population of 5,746. Of these, 86.43% were Indigenous (71.49% Miskito, 14.91% Mayangna), 12.63% Mestizo, 0.42% White, 0.19% Afro-Honduran or Black and 0.32% others.

== Development Situation ==
The municipality has very low development indicators. Accessibility to the municipality is very limited. Flying from other municipalities of the department or connection via river route, via the River Patuca, are the only ways to access the municipality. Within the municipality, different localities can only be accessed by river. Terrain roads only exist in the largest locality of Wampusirpi. Electricity is still not available and diesel generators are used by seldom few privileged.

== Health ==
The municipality has a Maternal and Infant clinic in the main locality of Wampusirpi and a health centre in another important locality of Krausirpi. Malaria is rampant in the municipality along with other infectious diseases.
