= Codela Airport =

Airport in Costa Rica

- IATA: CSC; ICAO: MRCA

Summary
- Airport type: Public
- Serves: Pocora
- Elevation AMSL: 328 ft / 100 m
- Coordinates: 10°09′38″N 83°35′35″W

Map
- Location in Costa Rica

Runways
| Direction | Length | | Surface |
| Direction | m | ft | Surface |
|---|---|---|---|
| 07/25 | 850 | 2,790 | Grass |
- Sources: Google Maps GCM

Codela Airport (IATA: CSC, ICAO: MRCA) is an airport serving the town of Pocora in Limón Province, Costa Rica. The airport is midway between Guácimo and Siquirres.

== See also ==
- Transport in Costa Rica
- List of airports in Costa Rica
