= Mocorón Airport =

Coordinates: 14.9891005°N 84.2208023°W

Durzona Airport (ICAO: MHDU) is an airstrip in the Gracias a Dios Department of Honduras used by the U.S. and Honduran militaries.

The 1,450 metres (4,760 ft) dirt Runway 01/19 is 7 kilometres (4.3 mi) southeast of the village of Mocorón, at the site of a remote Honduran military base near the northeastern border with Nicaragua.

The Puerto Lempira non-directional beacon (Ident: PLP) is located 30.3 nautical miles (56.1 km) east-northeast of the airstrip.

The airfield is used in a joint US military and Honduran effort to combat the illegal narcotics trade. The U.S. effort is led by Joint Task Force-Bravo stationed at Soto Cano Air Base, Honduras and the Honduran 5th Infantry Battalion. The airfield was once used by Col. Oliver North to fund the Contras in Nicaraqua during the Iran-Contra affair.

== See also ==
- Transport in Honduras
- List of airports in Honduras
