= Iriona =

- Municipality
- Location in Honduras
- Coordinates: 15°56′N 85°11′W
- Country: Honduras
- Department: Colón

Government
  - Mayor: Luis Santiago Suazo Álvarez (Libre)

Area
  - Total: 3,987 km^{2} (1,539 sq mi)

Population (2015)
  - Total: 21,207
  - Density: 5.319/km^{2} (13.78/sq mi)
- Time zone: UTC−06:00 (CST)
- Postal code: 32501
- Administrative code: 0203

Iriona is a municipality in the Honduran department of Colón.
