= Morocelí =

- Municipality
- Location in Honduras
- Coordinates: 14°07′N 86°52′W
- Country: Honduras
- Department: El Paraíso

Area
  - Total: 345 km^{2} (133 sq mi)

Population (2015)
  - Total: 17,153
  - Density: 49.7/km^{2} (129/sq mi)

Morocelí (Spanish pronunciation: [moɾoseˈli]) is a municipality in the Honduran department of El Paraíso.

The town houses a cigar factory operated by Nestor Plasencia.
