= Sirena Aerodrome =

- IATA: none; ICAO: MRSN

Summary
- Airport type: Public
- Serves: Sirena Ranger Station
- Elevation AMSL: 6 m (20 ft)
- Coordinates: 08°28′40″N 83°35′30″W

Map
- Location in Costa Rica

Runways
Direction	Length		Surface
Direction	m	ft	Surface
03/21	615	2,018	grass

Statistics (2014)
- Passengers: 930
- Source: Directorate General of Civil Aviation of Costa Rica.

Sirena Aerodrome (ICAO: MRSN) is a grass airstrip located in the middle of Corcovado National Park, Osa Peninsula, Costa Rica.

Sirena Aerodrome is surrounded by the lush vegetation of the area and influenced by the coastal winds of the Pacific Ocean. The airport currently does not have scheduled services from any airport, but is commonly used by charter services bringing tourists to visit the area. In 2014, 930 passengers traveled to Sirena Aerodrome, according to the Directorate General of Civil Aviation.

There is no road access to Sirena Aerodrome, but the area is served with basic services by the Sirena Ranger Station. The nearest town and road access in the area is Playa Carate (12 miles east of Sirena).

Considered as the shortest airstrip in Costa Rica, this dangerous landing is almost exclusively done by Alvaro Ramirez, an experienced pilot, who does charter services via Alfa Romeo Aero Taxi, his own company, with his Cessna 206.
