= El Jocotillo Airport =

- IATA: none; ICAO: MSJC

Summary
- Airport type: Public
- Elevation AMSL: 127 ft / 39 m
- Coordinates: 13°34′45″N 89°44′01″W

Map
- Location of the airport in El Salvador

Runways
| Direction | Length | | Surface |
| Direction | m | ft | Surface |
|---|---|---|---|
| 16/34 | 820 | 2,690 | Grass |
- Source: Google Maps OurAirports

El Jocotillo Airport (ICAO: MSJC) is an airport serving several small towns and villages in southern Sonsonate Department, El Salvador. The largest nearby city is the Pacific coastal port of Acajutla, at 10 kilometres (6.2 mi) west.

The Ilopango VOR-DME (Ident: YSV) is located 37.3 nautical miles (69.1 km) east of the airport.

== See also ==
- Transport in El Salvador
- List of airports in El Salvador
