= Hacienda Jacó Airport =

- IATA: none; ICAO: MRJO

Summary
- Airport type: Private
- Location: Playa Hermosa, Garabito
- Elevation AMSL: 6 m / 20 ft
- Coordinates: 09°33′34″N 084°33′37″W

Map
- Location in Costa Rica

Runways
| Direction | Length | | Surface |
| Direction | m | ft | Surface |
|---|---|---|---|
| 05/23 | 950 | 3,117 | grass |

Statistics (2014)
- Passengers: 231
- Passenger change 13–14: ▲99.1%
- Source: Directorate General of Civil Aviation of Costa Rica.

Hacienda Jacó Airport (ICAO: MRJO) is a former grass airstrip in Playa Hermosa, Garabito Canton, Puntarenas Province, Costa Rica.

The airport was the nearest airfield to Jacó, an important beach destination but on short distance to San José, making most of the travelers to reach this coastal city by land transportation. Even though, Hacienda Jacó Airport is seldom referred as Jacó Airport.

There were no scheduled flights to Hacienda Jacó Airport but the airfield was known for recreative activities. A skydiving company held its base in Hacienda Jacó Airport.

In 2014, 231 passengers traveled through Hacienda Jacó Airport.

== Passenger Statistics ==
These data show number of passengers movements into the airport, according to the Directorate General of Civil Aviation of Costa Rica's Statistical Yearbooks.

| Year | 2008 | 2009 | 2010 | 2011 | 2012 | 2013 | 2014 | 2015 |
|---|---|---|---|---|---|---|---|---|
| Passengers | 531 | 417 | 145 | 103 | 64 | 116 | 231 | T.B.A. |
| Growth (%) | ▲27.38% | ▼22.06% | ▼65.23% | ▼28.97% | ▼37.86% | ▲81.25% | ▲99.14% | T.B.A. |
Source: Costa Rica's Directorate General of Civil Aviation (DGAC). Statistical Yearbooks (Years 2008, 2009, 2010, 2011, 2012, 2013, and 2014)

| Year | 2000 | 2001 | 2002 | 2003 | 2004 | 2005 | 2006 | 2007 |
|---|---|---|---|---|---|---|---|---|
| Passengers | N.D. | N.D. | N.D. | 11 | N.D. | 9 | 214 | 420 |
| Growth (%) | N.D. | N.D. | N.D. | N.A. | N.D. | N.A. | ▲2,277.78% | ▲96.26% |
Source: Costa Rica's Directorate General of Civil Aviation (DGAC). Statistical Yearbooks (Years 2000-2005, 2006, and 2007,)
