= Puerto Jiménez =

Canton in Puntarenas province, Costa Rica

- Canton and District
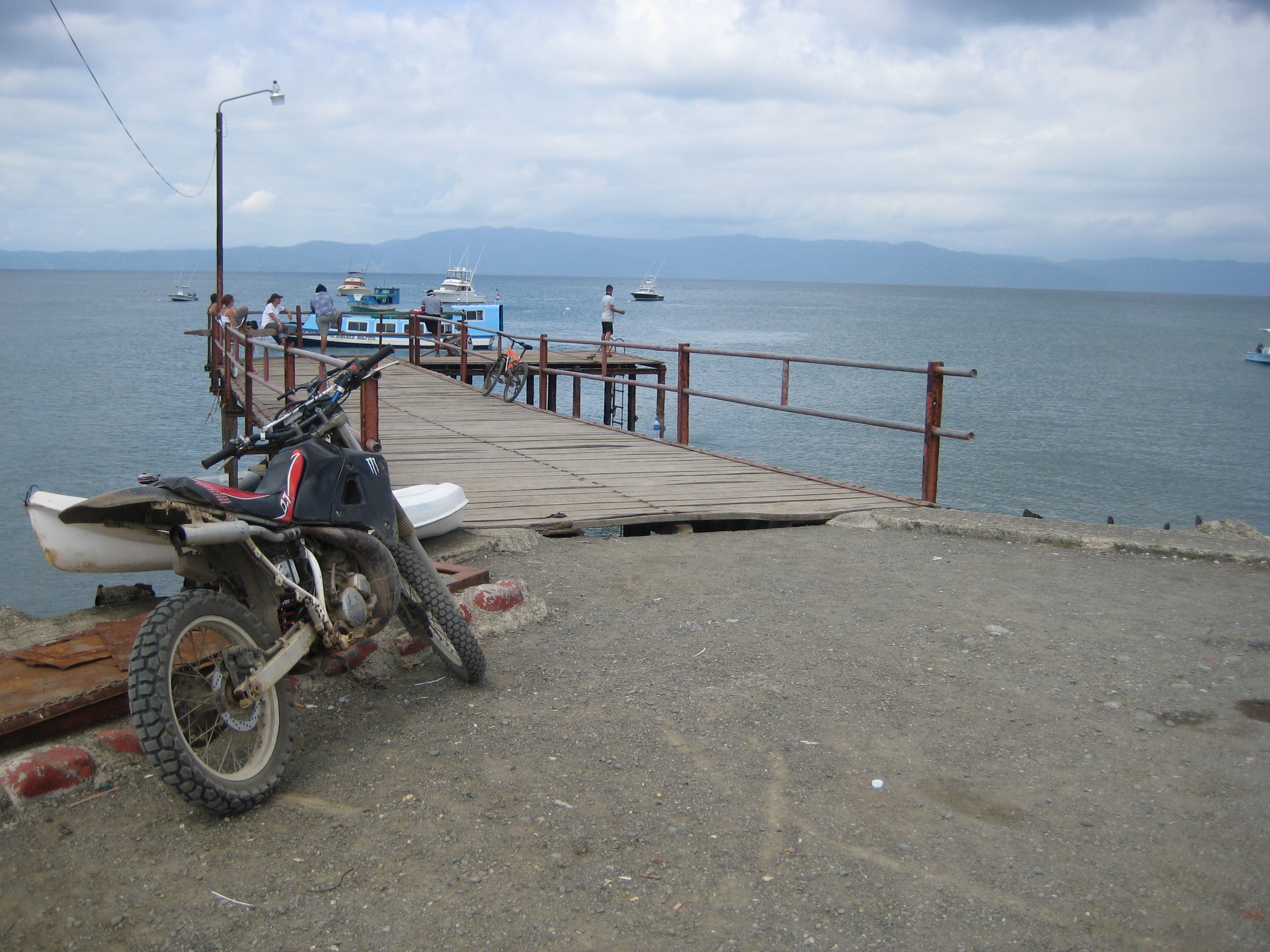
- Docks at Puerto Jiménez
- Puerto Jiménez canton
- Puerto Jiménez canton location in Costa Rica
- Coordinates: 8.5337766°N 83.4609779°W
- Country: Costa Rica
- Province: Puntarenas
- Creation: 8 April 2022
- Head city: Puerto Jiménez
- Districts: Districts: Puerto Jiménez

Government
  - Type: Municipality
  - Body: Municipalidad de Puerto Jiménez
  - Mayor: Enrique Segnini Saballo (PLP)

Area
  - Total: 722.56 km^{2} (278.98 sq mi)
- Elevation: 2 m (6.6 ft)

Population (2022)
  - Total: 12,836
  - Density: 17.765/km^{2} (46.010/sq mi)
- Time zone: UTC−06:00

Puerto Jiménez is the thirteenth canton of the Puntarenas province of Costa Rica. It is located in the Osa Peninsula next to the Golfo Dulce and the Pacific Ocean, it is the main gateway to the Corcovado National Park.

== History ==
As a district, Puerto Jiménez was created as one of the original two districts of Golfito canton on 10 June 1949 through decree 552, the other one being Golfito.

=== Canton creation ===
Due to the distance from the local government offices located across the waters of the Golfo Dulce gulf, and through land at a distance of 116 km and more than two hours of travel, the inhabitants of the then Puerto Jiménez district requested to become a canton on its own.

The initiative was spearheaded by deputy Óscar Mauricio Cascante Cascante (Social Christian Unity Party-Puntarenas #5) and on 21 October 2021, the first draft of the law project N° 22749 for the creation of the canton was presented, which was approved on the first debate on 24 March 2022 (40 votes out of 57) and the final version was approved on 28 March 2022 (48 votes). On 8 April 2022, the president of the republic, Carlos Alvarado Quesada, signed the law.

By the fourth article of the law project, there will be only one district, Puerto Jiménez, becoming the third canton with this peculiarity after Parrita and Monteverde, all three located in Puntarenas province.

Their first municipality, the body of the local government, will be elected on the 2024 municipal elections, which is the last step required to be a canton fully. The postal code, assigned uniquely to each district, was 60702, and will become 61301 for the Puerto Jiménez district.

== Districts ==
The canton of Puerto Jiménez is subdivided into only one district, occupying the same area as the whole canton:

1. Puerto Jiménez, with postal code 61301

== Geography ==
Puerto Jiménez has an area of 722.56 km^{2} (278.98 sq mi) and an elevation of 2 metres.

== Demographics ==
Historical population
Census	Pop.	±% p.a.
1950	1,173	—
1963	1,578	+2.31%
1973	2,231	+3.52%
1984	4,766	+7.14%
2000	6,102	+1.56%
2011	8,789	+3.37%
2022	10,644	+1.76%
Source: Instituto Nacional de Estadística y Censos; Centro Centroamericano de Población

For the 2011 census, Puerto Jiménez had a population of 8,789 inhabitants.

== Transportation ==
=== Road transportation ===
The district is covered by the following road routes:

- National Route 245

=== Airport ===
The canton is served by the Puerto Jiménez Airport. It is the third-busiest airport in Costa Rica, with 35,745 passengers in 2014.

== Economy ==
During the 1960s, Puerto Jiménez was a haven for gold mining and logging. Today it is a popular tourist destination due to its proximity to the national park, and has an active nightlife with several bars and restaurants. The town also boasts a supermarket, several clothing and shoe stores, a bakery, an art gallery, and several other shops. There are several hotels and hostels in Puerto Jiménez, including Lunas Hostel, Cabinas Jimenez, and Crocodile Bay Resort.

== Conservation ==
The Corcovado National Park and Golfo Dulce Forest Reserve, where sightings of scarlet macaws, toucans and trogons are common, are located partially in this canton.
