= Joaquín de Agüero Airport =

Santa Lucia Airport Joaquín de Agüero Airport Aeropuerto "Joaquín de Agüero"
- IATA: none; ICAO: MUSL

Summary
- Airport type: Public
- Serves: Santa Lucía, Camagüey, Cuba
- Elevation AMSL: 4 m / 13 ft
- Coordinates: 21°30′34″N 077°01′13″W

Map
- Location in Cuba

Runways
Direction	Length		Surface
Direction	m	ft	Surface
08/26	1,800	5,906	Asphalt
- Source: Airports of Cuba, DAFIF

Joaquín de Agüero Airport (Spanish: Aeropuerto "Joaquín de Agüero") (ICAO: MUSL), also known as Santa Lucía Airport, is an airport serving Playa Santa Lucía, a village of Nuevitas, in the Camagüey Province of Cuba.

== Facilities ==
The airport resides at an elevation of 4 m (13 ft) above mean sea level. It has one runway designated 08/26 with an asphalt surface measuring 1,800 m × 30 m (5,906 ft × 98 ft).
