= Pocora =

District in Guácimo canton, Limón province, Costa Rica

- District
- Pocora district
- Pocora district location in Costa Rica
- Coordinates: 10.1430041°N 83.6335251°W
- Country: Costa Rica
- Province: Limón
- Canton: Guácimo
- Creation: 26 June 1971

Area
  - Total: 72.7 km^{2} (28.1 sq mi)
- Elevation: 96 m (315 ft)

Population (2011)
  - Total: 6,432
  - Density: 88.5/km^{2} (229/sq mi)
- Time zone: UTC−06:00
- Postal code: 70603

Pocora is a district of the Guácimo canton, in the Limón province of Costa Rica.

== History ==
Pocora was created on 26 June 1971 by Decreto 1769-G.

== Geography ==
Pocora has an area of 72.7 km^{2} and an elevation of 96 metres.

== Locations ==
- Neighborhoods (Barrios): Pocora Sur
- Villages (Poblados): El Carmen

== Demographics ==
Historical population
Census	Pop.	±% p.a.
1963	609	—
1973	1,393	+8.63%
1984	2,717	+6.26%
2000	5,750	+4.80%
2011	6,432	+1.02%
2022	7,785	+1.75%
Source: Instituto Nacional de Estadística y Censos; Centro Centroamericano de Población

For the 2011 census, Pocora had a population of 6,432 inhabitants.

== Transportation ==
=== Road transportation ===
The district is covered by the following road routes:

- National Route 32
