= Angelina Field =

Airport in the Dominican Republic

Angelina Airport
- IATA: none; ICAO: MDAN

Summary
- Airport type: Public
- Serves: Cotuí, Dominican Republic
- Elevation AMSL: 197 ft / 60 m
- Coordinates: 19°07′52″N 70°13′10″W

Map
- Location of the airport in the Dominican Republic

Runways
| Direction | Length | | Surface |
| Direction | m | ft | Surface |
|---|---|---|---|
| 12/30 | 900 | 2,953 | Asphalt |
- Source: AIP GCM Google Maps

Angelina Field (ICAO: MDAN) is an airport in Cotuí, at the small town of El Pescozón in the Sánchez Ramírez Province of the Dominican Republic. It operates exclusively during daylight hours under the authority of the Dominican Institute of Civil Aviation (IDAC). The airport sits at an elevation of 60 meters (197 feet) and features a single asphalt runway measuring 900 meters. The airfield serves the local region and is situated near several major Dominican aviation hubs, including Cibao International Airport and Samaná El Catey International Airport.

== Description ==
The airport is located in the Sánchez Ramírez Province at coordinates 19° 07’ 51.42” N and 070° 13’ 26.28” W, sitting at an elevation of 60 meters (196.8 feet). The facility features a single asphalt runway, oriented 12/30, which measures 900 meters in length and 15 meters in width. It operates under the authority of the Dominican Institute of Civil Aviation (IDAC) exclusively during daylight hours.

Its ICAO airport code is (MDAN) and situated near several other regional aviation facilities, including El Rancho Airport, Cibao International Airport, Samaná El Catey International Airport, Constanza Airport, and La Isabela International Airport.The Santiago VOR/DME (Ident: SGO) is located 27.3 nautical miles (50.6 km) northwest of the airport. The Higuero VOR/DME (Ident: HGR) is located 36.2 nautical miles (67.0 km) south-southeast of Angelina Airport.

== Accident ==
In 2025, there was a small accident that had two injured victims who departed from this airport and fell in La Mata.

== Public event ==
On 31 October 2010, the North West Palma Dominican Sports Aeroclub and the Zoherga Aeronautical Training School hosted an aviation outreach event at this airport for 2,000 attendees.

== See also ==
- Transport in Dominican Republic
- List of airports in Dominican Republic
