= Carate Airport =

Airport in Costa Rica

- IATA: none; ICAO: MRCE

Summary
- Airport type: Public
- Location: Carate, Golfito
- Elevation AMSL: 5 m / 16 ft
- Coordinates: 08°26′31″N 083°27′33″W

Map
- Location in Costa Rica

Runways
Direction	Length		Surface
Direction	m	ft	Surface
10/28	720	2,362	Concrete

Statistics (2014)
- Passengers: 406
- Passenger change 13–14: ▲59.2%
- Source: Directorate General of Civil Aviation of Costa Rica.

Carate Airport (ICAO: MRCE) is a concrete airstrip serving the coastal destination of Sirena, in Osa Peninsula, Costa Rica. The airport in mainly used by charter services with tourists visiting the beaches near Sirena town and the Corcovado National Park. The airport currently does not have scheduled services from any other airport.

In 2014, 406 passengers traveled to Sirena Aerodrome, according to the operator, the Directorate General of Civil Aviation.

== Passenger Statistics ==
These data show number of passengers movements into the airport, according to the Directorate General of Civil Aviation of Costa Rica's Statistical Yearbooks.

Year	2008	2009	2010	2011	2012	2013	2014	2015
Passengers	1,767	355	392	208	175	255	406	T.B.A.
Growth (%)	▼3.86%	▼79.91%	▲10.42%	▼46.94%	▼15.87%	▼45.71%	▲59.22%	T.B.A.
Source: Costa Rica's Directorate General of Civil Aviation (DGAC). Statistical Yearbooks (Years 2008, 2009, 2010, 2011, 2012, 2013, and 2014)

Year	2000	2001	2002	2003	2004	2005	2006	2007
Passengers	228	1,274	1,158	1,756	2,555	3,421	1,995	1,838
Growth (%)	N.A.	▲458.77%	▼9.11%	▲51.64%	▲45.50%	▲33.89%	▼41.68%	▼7.87%
Source: Costa Rica's Directorate General of Civil Aviation (DGAC). Statistical Yearbooks (Years 2000-2005, 2006, and 2007,)
