= Tiquisate =

Coordinates: 14°17′N 91°22′W

- Municipality and town
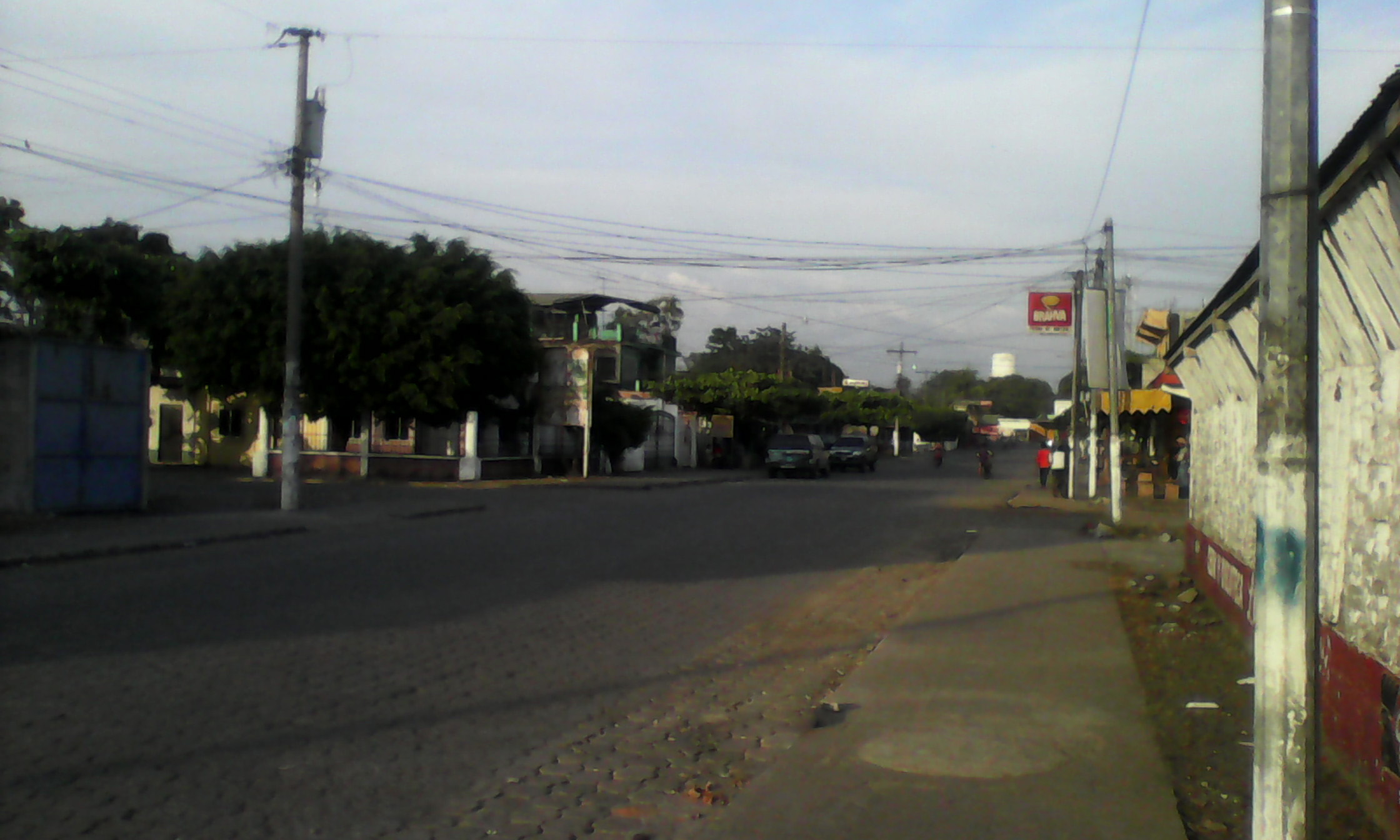

- Location in Guatemala
- Country: Guatemala
- Department: Escuintla Department

Area
  - Total: 180.7 sq mi (468.1 km^{2})
- Elevation: 299 ft (91 m)

Population (2023)
  - Total: 64,537
  - Density: 357.1/sq mi (137.9/km^{2})
- Climate: Am

Tiquisate (Spanish pronunciation: [tikiˈsate]) is a city and a municipality in the Escuintla department of Guatemala. It covers an area of approximately 468.1 km^{2} (180.7 sq mi). As per 2023 estimates, it has a population of about 64,537 inhabitants.

== Geography ==
Tiquisate is a municipality in the Escuintla Department in Guatemala. It is spread over an area of 468.1 km^{2} (180.7 sq mi). It lies in the north eastern part of the department, about 90 km (56 mi) from the departmental capital of Escuintla and 147 km (91 mi) from the national capital of Guatemala city. It borders the municipalities of Río Bravo to the north, Nueva Concepción to the east, Santo Domingo Suchitepéquez to the west, San José El Idolo and Chicacao to the north east and Pacific Ocean to the south. It is bound by the Madre Vieja River to the east, and Nahualate River to the west.

Located at an elevation of 90.7 m (298 ft) above sea level, Tiquisate has a tropical monsoon climate (Köppen climate classification: Am). The municipality has an average annual temperature of 26.09 °C (78.96 °F), and receives about 123.47 mm (4.861 in) of rainfall annually.

== Demographics and economy ==
The municipality had an estimated population of 64,537 inhabitants in 2023. The population consisted of 33,007 males and 31,530 females. About 29.7% of the population was below the age of fourteen, and 5.7% was over the age of 65 years. The population was evenly split between urban (51%) and rural (49%) areas. About 69.3% of the inhabitants were born in the same municipality. Ladinos (96.4%) formed the major ethnic group, with Maya (2.8%) forming a small minority. The municipality had a literacy rate of 85.1%, and Spanish (97.5%) was the most spoken language.

Agriculture is the major economic activity in the town. Other small scale industries include agro based industries and handicrafts.
