= Brus Laguna =

- Municipality
- Location within Honduras
- Coordinates: 15°46′15″N 84°32′20″W
- Country: Honduras
- Department: Gracias a Dios

Area
  - Total: 3,292 km^{2} (1,271 sq mi)
- Elevation: 14 m (46 ft)

Population (2015)
  - Total: 13,224
  - Density: 4.017/km^{2} (10.40/sq mi)
- Time zone: UTC-6 (Central America)

Brus Laguna (Spanish pronunciation: [bɾus laˈɣuna]) is a municipality in the Honduran department of Gracias a Dios.

The municipality's population is about 13,200 inhabitants. It is served by Brus Laguna Airport, a gravel airstrip 3 kilometres (1.9 mi) south of town.

== Demographics ==
At the time of the 2013 Honduras census, Brus Laguna municipality had a population of 12,720. Of these, 78.63% were Indigenous (77.64% Miskito), 20.25% Mestizo, 0.52% White, 0.45% Afro-Honduran or Black and 0.16% others.

By 2018, the municipality had an estimated population of approximately 13,224 inhabitants, composed of 48.6% men and 51.4% women.
