= Cueva Las Maravillas Airport =

- IATA: none; ICAO: MDSP

Summary
- Airport type: Public
- Owner: City of San Pedro
- Operator: Patronato Cueva de Las Maravillas
- Location: San Pedro-Las Cuevas, Dominican Republic
- Elevation AMSL: 97 ft / 30 m
- Coordinates: 18°27′05″N 69°10′00″W

Map
- Location of the airport in the Dominican Republic

Runways
| Direction | Length | | Surface |
| Direction | m | ft | Surface |
|---|---|---|---|
| 11/29 | 1,200 | 3,937 | Asphalt |
- GCM Google Maps

Cueva Las Maravillas Airport (ICAO: MDSP) is an airport 13 kilometres (8 mi) east of San Pedro de Macorís, capital of the San Pedro de Macorís Province in the Dominican Republic.

== Operations ==
The airport was opened on February 7, 2008. Cueva Las Maravillas Airport has flights to and from other airports in the Dominican Republic, bringing tourists for Cueva de las Maravillas National Park, which features a popular natural cavern complex. The La Romana VOR/DME (Ident: LRN) is located 14.5 nautical miles (26.9 km) east of the airport.

== See also ==
- Transport in Dominican Republic
- List of airports in Dominican Republic
