= Puerto Lempira =

- Municipality
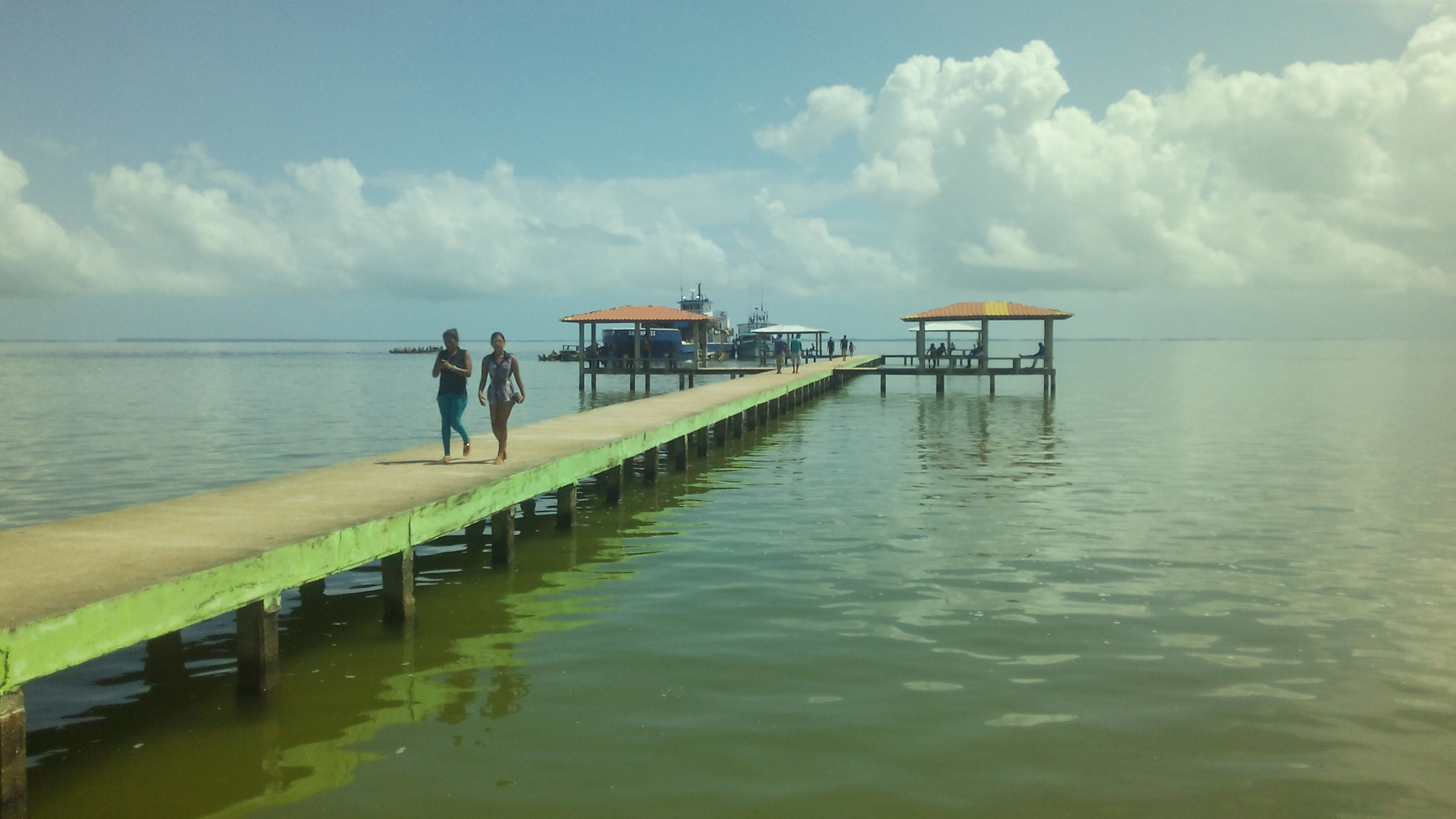
- Dock in Puerto Lempira

- Location in Honduras
- Coordinates: 15°16′N 83°46′W
- Country: Honduras
- Department: Gracias a Dios
- Villages: 31

Area
  - Municipality: 7,126 km^{2} (2,751 sq mi)
- Elevation: 10 m (33 ft)

Population (2023 projection)
  - Municipality: 61,626
  - Density: 8.648/km^{2} (22.40/sq mi)
  - Urban: 25,662
- Time zone: UTC−6 (Central America)
- Climate: Af

Puerto Lempira or Auhya Yari is the Miskito capital of the Gracias a Dios department in northeastern Honduras, located on the shores of the Caratasca Lagoon. Though it does not have paved roads, it is the largest town in the Gracias a Dios Department.

The town is named for the 16th century leader of the indigenous Lenca peoples, Lempira, who directed an ultimately unsuccessful resistance against the Spanish conquistador forces in the 1530s.

Puerto Lempira became the departmental capital in 1975, prior to which it was Brus Laguna. In the 1980s, the town became a centre for CIA operations against the Sandinistas.

Its population is 22,860 (2023 calculation).

Puerto Lempira is sister city to Plattsburgh, New York, US, and has been since 2011.

== Demographics ==
At the time of the 2013 Honduras census, Puerto Lempira municipality had a population of 47,528. Of these, 82.41% were Indigenous (81.98% Miskito), 14.86% Mestizo, 1.34% Afro-Honduran or Black, 1.27% White and 0.13% others.

By 2018, the municipality had a population of 54,554 inhabitants, composed of 26,440 men and 28,115 women. Of the total population, 34,140 people lived in rural areas, while 20,414 resided in urban areas.

== Culture ==
Miskito culture is dominant, though not exclusive.

== Language ==
Miskito language is dominant and official in the region, followed by Mayangna and Spanish.

== Transportation ==
The city is served by Puerto Lempira Airport, which operates several flights a week on a regular schedule.

== Climate ==
Like most of the Caribbean side of Central America, Puerto Lempira has a warm, humid and rainy tropical rainforest climate (Köppen Af). Its driest month of March, when the relentlessly wet trade winds are weakest, is only marginally rainy enough to avoid a tropical monsoon classification; however, between June and December monthly rainfall consistently averages above or near 300 millimetres or 12 inches.

Climate data for Puerto Lempira (1961-1990, extremes 1961-present)
Month	Jan	Feb	Mar	Apr	May	Jun	Jul	Aug	Sep	Oct	Nov	Dec	Year
Record high °C (°F)	33.0 (91.4)	35.2 (95.4)	36.4 (97.5)	37.0 (98.6)	38.0 (100.4)	34.8 (94.6)	35.0 (95.0)	37.3 (99.1)	38.1 (100.6)	35.0 (95.0)	34.6 (94.3)	32.8 (91.0)	38.1 (100.6)
Mean daily maximum °C (°F)	28.2 (82.8)	28.8 (83.8)	30.2 (86.4)	31.1 (88.0)	31.6 (88.9)	30.7 (87.3)	30.1 (86.2)	30.3 (86.5)	30.6 (87.1)	29.7 (85.5)	29.0 (84.2)	28.4 (83.1)	29.9 (85.8)
Daily mean °C (°F)	25.9 (78.6)	26.2 (79.2)	27.3 (81.1)	28.2 (82.8)	28.5 (83.3)	28.1 (82.6)	27.9 (82.2)	28.1 (82.6)	27.8 (82.0)	27.2 (81.0)	26.7 (80.1)	26.1 (79.0)	27.3 (81.1)
Mean daily minimum °C (°F)	22.0 (71.6)	21.8 (71.2)	22.1 (71.8)	23.0 (73.4)	23.7 (74.7)	24.1 (75.4)	23.9 (75.0)	24.0 (75.2)	23.6 (74.5)	23.2 (73.8)	23.1 (73.6)	22.7 (72.9)	23.1 (73.6)
Record low °C (°F)	14.5 (58.1)	14.0 (57.2)	12.5 (54.5)	15.0 (59.0)	21.4 (70.5)	15.5 (59.9)	16.0 (60.8)	17.4 (63.3)	17.0 (62.6)	15.3 (59.5)	15.5 (59.9)	11.0 (51.8)	11.0 (51.8)
Average rainfall mm (inches)	193.2 (7.61)	135.8 (5.35)	69.3 (2.73)	79.7 (3.14)	215.6 (8.49)	368.0 (14.49)	420.3 (16.55)	354.1 (13.94)	316.3 (12.45)	456.9 (17.99)	430.6 (16.95)	293.1 (11.54)	3,332.9 (131.22)
Average rainy days (≥ 1.0 mm)	12	9	6	5	9	16	19	17	16	19	16	15	159
Source 1: NOAA
Source 2: Meteo Climat (record highs and lows)
