= Patulul =

Coordinates: 14°25′N 91°10′W

- Municipality
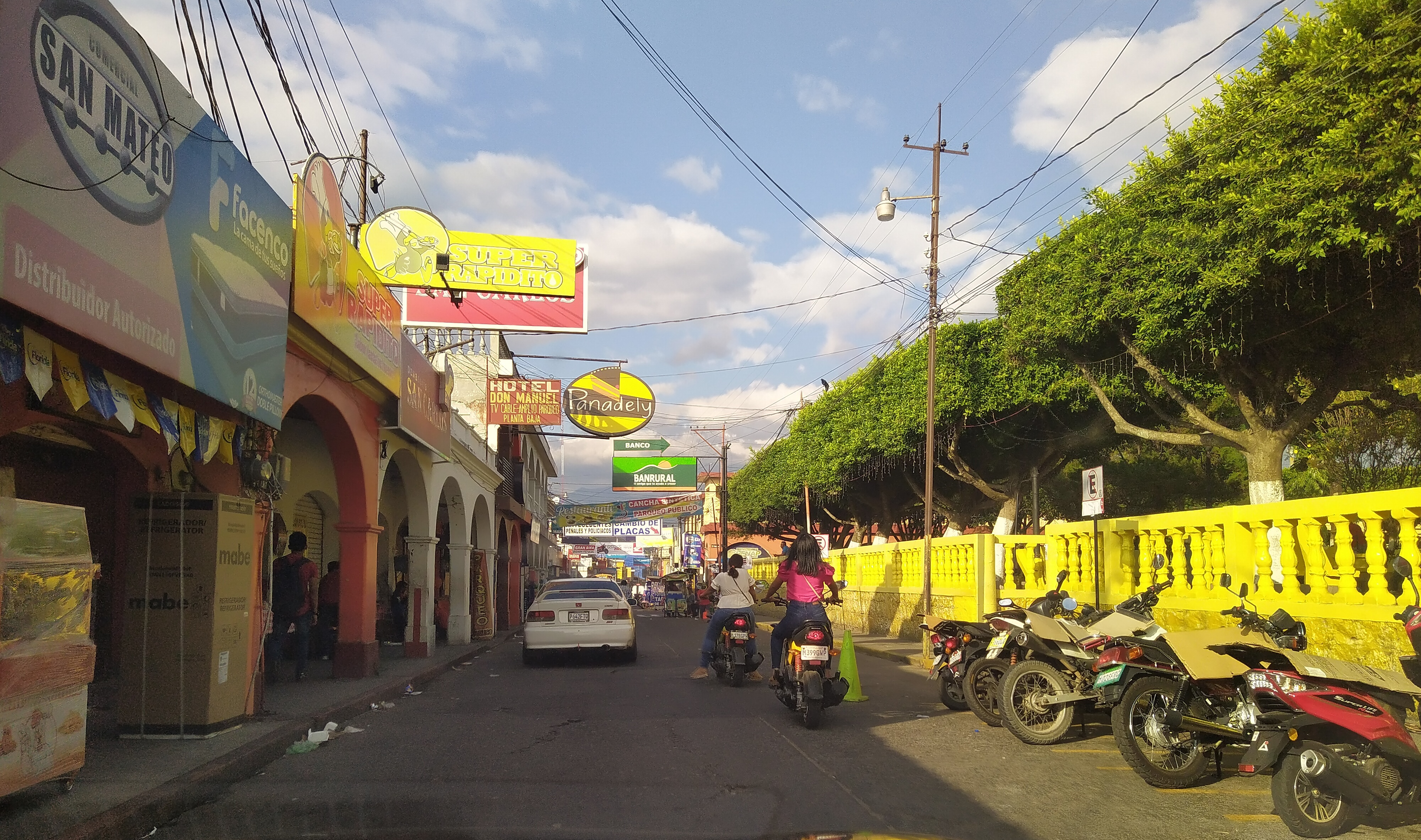

- Location in Guatemala
- Country: Guatemala
- Department: Suchitepéquez Department

Area
  - Total: 93 sq mi (241 km^{2})

Population (2018 census)
  - Total: 40,683
  - Density: 437/sq mi (169/km^{2})

Patulul (Patulul: from the Kʼicheʼ language, derived from the two terms Pa, meaning "tree," and Tulul, meaning "Sapote," which together mean "sapote tree") is a town, with a population of 11,343 (2018 census), and a municipality in the Suchitepéquez department of Guatemala.

It is located north of the coastal region of Tiquisate. It is both a coastal region as well as a mountainous region. Its neighboring town, San Juan Bautista (Saint John the Baptist) is known for its fine dairy products. They both have their town festivals during the month of July.

In pre-Columbian times, it is known that the Kʼicheʼ had to face a war between the alliance formed by the Pipil and the Tzutujil and that a center of supplies was Patulul.

Following Central American independence in 1821, Patulul was assigned to the Atitlán Circuit, in district No. 11 (Suchitepéquez) for the administration of justice. Subsequently, in April 1838 Patulul became part of the region that constituted the short-lived State of Los Altos; but this attempt at secession was crushed by General Rafael Carrera, who reintegrated it into the State of Los Altos to the State of Guatemala in 1840.

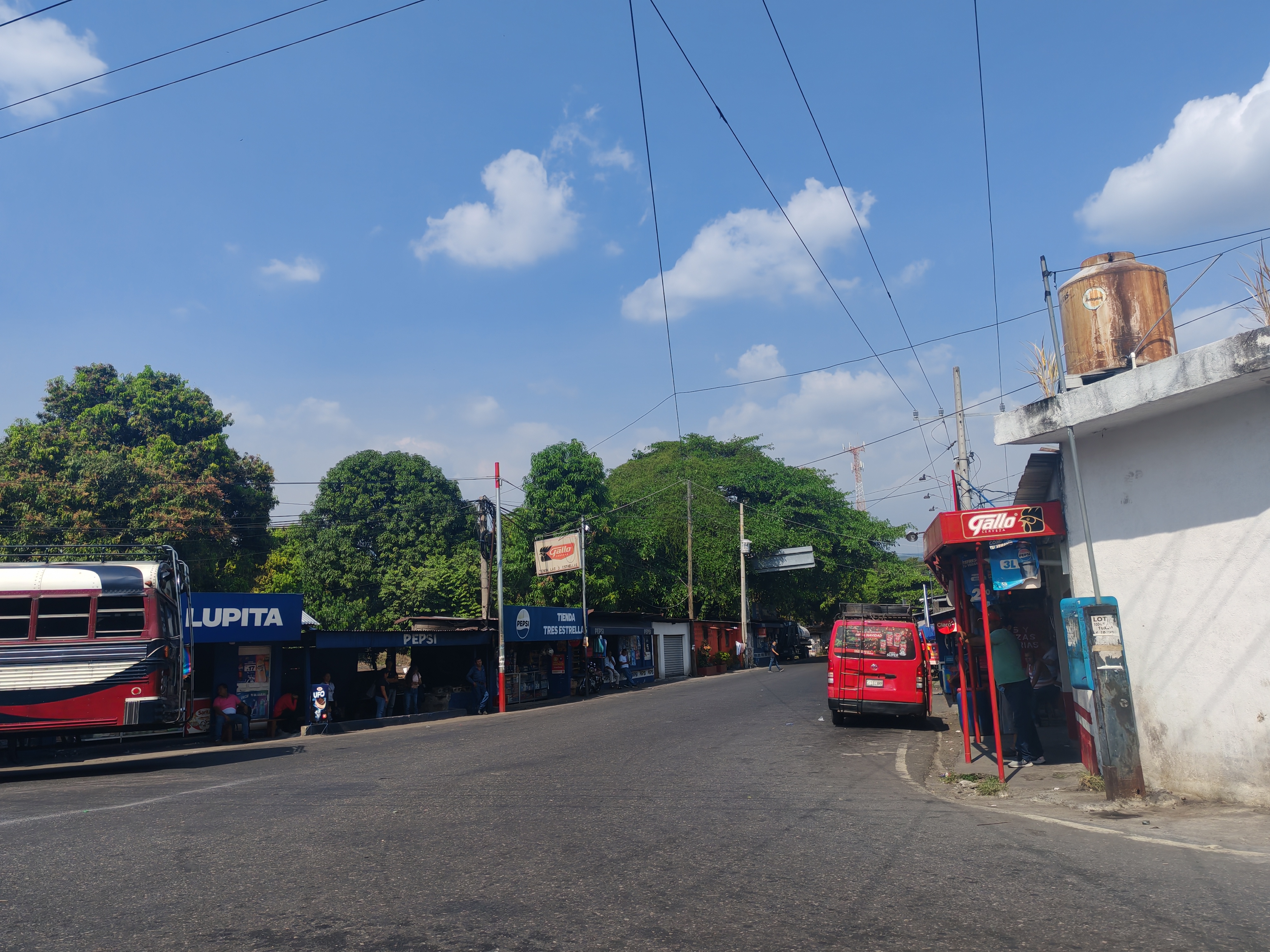
Cocales, Patulul
