= List of airports in the Dominican Republic =

This is a list of airports in the Dominican Republic, grouped by type and sorted by location.

Bolded airport names indicate that the airport has scheduled service on commercial airlines.

City served	Province	ICAO	IATA	Airport name	Coordinates
**International**
Barahona	Barahona	MDBH	BRX	**María Montez International Airport**	18°15′10″N 71°07′20″W
La Romana	La Romana	MDLR	LRM	**La Romana International Airport**	18°27′08″N 68°54′40″W
Puerto Plata	Puerto Plata	MDPP	POP	**Gregorio Luperón International Airport**	19°45′28″N 70°34′12″W
Punta Cana / Higüey	La Altagracia	MDPC	PUJ	**Punta Cana International Airport**	18°34′00″N 68°21′07″W
Sánchez	Samaná	MDCY	AZS	**Samaná El Catey International Airport** (Dr. Juan Bosch)	19°16′12″N 069°44′15″W
Santiago de los Caballeros	Santiago	MDST	STI	**Cibao International Airport** (Santiago International)	19°24′22″N 070°36′17″W
Santo Domingo	Distrito Nacional	MDJB	JBQ	**El Higüero** (Dr. Joaquín Balaguer)	18°34′20″N 069°59′08″W
Santo Domingo	Santo Domingo Este	MDSD	SDQ	**Las Américas-JFPG International Airport** (Dr. José Fco. Peña Gómez)	18°25′46″N 069°40′08″W
**Domestic**
Samaná	Samaná	MDAB	EPS	**Arroyo Barril Airport**	19°11′55″N 69°25′50″W
Constanza	La Vega	MDCZ	COZ	**Constanza Airport**	18°54′27″N 70°43′15″W
Dajabón	Dajabón	MDDJ		Dajabón Airport	19°33′55″N 71°40′30″W
Monte Cristi	Monte Cristi	MDMC		Osvaldo Virgil Airport	19°51′55″N 71°38′43″W
Pedernales	Pedernales	MDCR	CBJ	Cabo Rojo Airport	17°55′45″N 071°38′45″W
San Pedro de Macorís	San Pedro de Macorís	MDSP	SPM	**Cueva Las Maravillas Airport**	18°27′05″N 69°10′00″W
**Other**
Azua	Azua	MDAD		Azua Dominica Airport	18°25′28″N 70°43′45″W
Cotuí	Sánchez Ramírez	MDAN		Angelina Airport	19°07′52″N 70°13′10″W
Enriquillo	Barahona	MDHN		Enriquillo Airport	17°52′20″N 71°16′10″W
Esperanza	Valverde	MDES		Esperanza Airport	19°35′03″N 70°57′25″W
Monte Cristi	Monte Cristi	MDWO		Walterio Airport	19°45′25″N 71°37′30″W
San Cristóbal	San Cristóbal	MDLM		Los Montones Airport	18°31′15″N 70°05′55″W
**Military**
San Isidro		MDSI	ZXD	San Isidro Air Base	18°30′10″N 69°45′45″W
**Closed or unverified coordinates**
Santiago	Santiago	MDST	STI	Santiago Municipal Airport - closed March 2002	
Santo Domingo	Distrito Nacional	MDHE	HEX	Herrera International Airport - closed February 2006	
Las Terrenas	Samaná	MDPO	EPS	El Portillo Airport - closed February 2012	
Higüey	La Altagracia	MDBG		Baigua Airport - closed	
Jimaní	Independencia	MDJI		Jimani Airport - closed	
Boca Chica	Santo Domingo	MDBL		Batey Luisa Airport	
Consuelo	San Pedro de Macorís	MDBA		Batey Anita Airport	
El Valle	Hato Mayor	MDEV		El Valle Airport	
Monte Plata	Monte Plata	MDJS		Batey Juan Sanches Airport	
San Pedro de Macorís	San Pedro de Macorís	MDIG	IGQ	Ingenio Quisqueya Airport	
Sabana de la Mar	Hato Mayor	MDSB	SNX	Sabana de la Mar Airport	19°03′43″N 069°23′07″W
San Juan de la Maguana	San Juan	MDSJ	SJM	San Juan de la Maguana Airport	18°50′00″N 071°14′00″W
Cotuí	Sánchez Ramírez	MDSM		San Miguel Airport	19°03′00″N 070°09′00″W

== See also ==
- Transportation in the Dominican Republic
- List of the busiest airports in Dominican Republic
- List of airports by ICAO code: M#MD - Dominican Republic
- Wikipedia: WikiProject Aviation/Airline destination lists: North America#Dominican Republic
