= Cabo Rojo Airport =

Airport in the Dominican Republic

Cabo Rojo Airport Aeródromo Doméstico de Cabo Rojo
- IATA: CBJ; ICAO: MDCR

Summary
- Airport type: Public
- Operator: Government
- Serves: Pedernales, Dominican Republic
- Elevation AMSL: 262 ft (80 m)
- Coordinates: 17°55′45″N 071°38′45″W

Map
- Location of the airport in the Dominican Republic

Runways
Direction	Length		Surface
Direction	m	ft	Surface
12/30	1,460	4,790	Asphalt
- Source: WAD GCM Google Maps

Cabo Rojo Airport (Spanish: Aeródromo Doméstico de Cabo Rojo) (IATA: CBJ, ICAO: MDCR) is a domestic airport located in the Pedernales Province of the Dominican Republic. Operating under the authority of the Dominican Air Force, the daytime facility features a 1,500-meter asphalt runway and is equipped with a VOR/DME navigation system.

The airport primarily serves the southwestern region of the country and connects the area to the capital via regular domestic flights to Santo Domingo's La Isabela International Airport. While the government initially announced plans in 2016 to expand the Cabo Rojo airfield into an international airport to boost regional tourism, these plans were superseded in January 2024 when the Dominican government opted to construct a completely new international airport elsewhere in the Pedernales province.

== Description ==
The airport, located in the Pedernales province at coordinates 17° 55’ 44” N and 071° 38’ 40” W at an elevation of 80 meters, features a 1,500-by-28-meter asphalt runway with an 11/29 orientation and operates during daytime hours under the authority of the Dominican Air Force.This facility is designated by the ICAO airport code (MDCR) and the IATA airport code CBJ. It connects with other nearby facilities, including Enriquillo Field, Maria Montez International Airport, Jacmel Airport, Toussaint Louverture International Airport, and San Juan de la Maguana Airport.The Cabo Rojo VOR/DME (Ident: DCR) is located on the field.

== Operational ==
The General Directorate of Public-Private Partnerships (DGAPP) of the Dominican Republic, the Pro-Pedernales Trust, and the Junta de Aviación Civil (JAC) have announced the launch of a new domestic flight route connecting La Isabela International Airport to the Cabo Rojo airfield, beginning 1 November 2022. It was operated by the Dominican airline Air Century, in partnership with REP-AIR. The flight will take 35 minutes and will run twice a week on Mondays and Fridays, costing $50 for a one-way ticket on a 19-passenger British Aerospace Jetstream 32 aircraft. The flight was inaugurated in Pedernales with a traditional water salute and was attended by the DGAPP director, Sigmund Freund.

In 2016, Marino Collante, the executive director of the Airport Department, announced plans to expand and convert the airport into an international airport, coordinating with the Ministry of Public Works as part of the Pedernales Tourism Development Plan initiated by Danilo Medina to boost economic and tourism growth in the area. But in January 2024, the government of the Dominican Republic planned a new international airport in a different area around the southwest of the country, in Pedernales province.

== See also ==
- Transport in Dominican Republic
- List of airports in Dominican Republic
