= Dajabón Airport =

- IATA: none; ICAO: MDDJ

Summary
- Airport type: Public
- Serves: Dajabón, Dominican Republic
- Elevation AMSL: 170 ft / 52 m
- Coordinates: 19°33′55″N 71°40′30″W

Map
- Location of the airport in the Dominican Republic

Runways
Direction	Length		Surface
Direction	m	ft	Surface
08/26	1,735	5,692	Grass
- Source: GCM Google Maps

Dajabón Airport (ICAO: MDDJ) is a small, military-managed regional airfield located in the Dajabón Province of the Dominican Republic, operating near the northern border with Haiti. Situated within the Santo Domingo Flight Information Region at coordinates 19°33’49” N, 071°40’51” W, the facility is under the direct jurisdiction of the Dominican Air Force (Fuerza Aérea Dominicana) and operates exclusively during daylight hours (HJ). The aerodrome sits at an elevation of 20 meters (65.6 feet) above sea level and features a single grass runway designated as 07/25, measuring 1,700 meters long by 50 meters wide and rated for Single Isolated Wheel Load (SIWL) operations.

== Description ==
It is located in the Dajabón Province of the Dominican Republic situated at coordinates 19°33’49” N, 071°40’51” W. Operating exclusively during daylight hours (HJ), the aerodrome falls under the direct jurisdiction of the Dominican Airforce. The airfield sits at an elevation of 20 meters (65.6 feet) above sea level and features a single grass (grama) runway oriented 07/25. Measuring 1,700 meters in length by 50 meters in width, the runway is rated for Single Isolated Wheel Load (SIWL) aircraft operations.

Its ICAO airport code is MDDJ, and it operatesnear the border within the Santo Domingo Flight Information Region. The facility at latitude 19.56360 and longitude -71.68080. The aerodrome relies on a network of regional neighbors for cross-border traffic and emergency diversions, sharing the airspace with nearby facilities such as Walterio Airport, Monte Cristi Airport, and Piloto Airport in the Dominican Republic, alongside Ouanaminthe Airport and Phaeton Airport.

The Monte Cristi non-directional beacon (Ident: MTC) is located 18.1 nautical miles (33.5 km) north of the airport. The Cap Haitien VOR (Ident: HCN) is located 30.8 nautical miles (57.0 km) west-northwest of Dajabón Airport.

== See also ==
- Transport in Dominican Republic
- List of airports in Dominican Republic
