= Barahona =

Barahona may refer to:

== Places ==
=== Dominican Republic ===
- Barahona Province
  - Barahona, Dominican Republic or Santa Cruz de Barahona, capital of the province above
    - Port of Barahona
  - Roman Catholic Diocese of Barahona
  - Barahona Men (volleyball club)

=== Guatemala ===
- Santa Catarina Barahona, a municipality in the department of Sacatepéquez

=== Puerto Rico ===
- Barahona, Morovis, Puerto Rico, a barrio

== People ==
- Belisario Porras Barahona (1856–1942), Panamanian journalist and politician
- Carlos Barahona (born 1980), Colombian football player
- Juan de Esquivel Barahona (c. 1560–after 1625), Spanish composer
- Luis Barahona de Soto (1548–1595), Spanish poet
- Luis Marín Barahona (born 1983), Chilean football player
- Mario Alexander Barahona Martínez (born 1976), Honduran politician
- Martín Barahona, El Salvador Anglican bishop
- Miguel Paz Barahona (1863–1937), Honduran president
- Nacho Barahona, Spanish film editor
- Nelson Barahona (born 1987), Panamanian football player
- Noelle Barahona (born 1990), Chilean skier
- Ralph Barahona (born 1965), American ice hockey player
- Wilfredo Barahona (born 1983), Honduran footballer

== See also ==
- Baraona
