= Esperanza Field =

Esperanza Airport Peñuela Airport
- IATA: none; ICAO: MDES

Summary
- Airport type: Public
- Serves: Esperanza, Dominican Republic
- Elevation AMSL: 328 ft / 100 m
- Coordinates: 19°35′03″N 70°57′25″W

Map
- Location of the airport in the Dominican Republic

Runways
Direction	Length		Surface
Direction	m	ft	Surface
11/29	730	2,395	Gravel
- Source: AIP GCM Google Maps

Peñuela / Esperanza Field (ICAO: MDES) is a small regional airport located in the Valverde Province of the Dominican Republic. Situated within the Santo Domingo flight information region, the facility operates exclusively during daylight hours under the jurisdiction of the Junta de Aviación Civil. The airfield features a single 600-meter gravel runway (oriented 09/27) and primarily handles local aviation, relying on nearby navigation aids like the Santiago and Puerto Plata VOR/DME stations. In November 2018, a small commercial aircraft crashed nearby due to mechanical failure.

== Description ==
The airport is located in Valverde Province, situated at coordinates 19°35’02.58” N, 070°57’31.56” W. It operates strictly during daylight hours (HJ) under the jurisdiction of the Junta de Aviación Civil. The facility features a single gravel runway oriented 09/27 that measures 600 meters long by 13 meters wide, sits at an elevation of 100 meters (328 feet) above sea level, and is rated for Single Isolated Wheel Load aircraft operations.

The airport is located at latitude 19.58410 and longitude -70.95690. The ICAO code for this airport is MDES. The airport is in the Santo Domingo flight information region.

The Santiago VOR/DME (Ident: SGO) is located 22.6 nautical miles (41.9 km) east-southeast of the airport. The Puerto Plata VOR/DME (Ident: PTA) is located 24.2 nautical miles (44.8 km) east-northeast of Esperanza Airport.

== Accident ==
On 13 November 2018, a small aircraft owned by CODEACA with the license plate HI191 crashed into a banana plantation on a farm in the Peñuela. It went down due to sudden mechanical failures while it was on route to the Peñuela Airfield. The pilot, Luis Carlos Paulino, survived the crash with minor injuries and was transported to the Dr. Montesinos Medical Center in Esperanza.

== See also ==
- Transport in Dominican Republic
- List of airports in Dominican Republic
