= Enriquillo Field =

Juancho Enriquillo Airport
- IATA: none; ICAO: MDHN

Summary
- Airport type: Public
- Serves: Enriquillo, Dominican Republic
- Elevation AMSL: 29 ft / 9 m
- Coordinates: 17°52′20″N 71°16′10″W

Map
- Location of the airport in the Dominican Republic

Runways
Direction	Length		Surface
Direction	m	ft	Surface
09/27	890	2,920	Grass
- Source: AIP GCM

Juancho Enriquillo Airport (ICAO: MDHN) is an agricultural airstrip 4 kilometres (2.5 mi) southwest of Enriquillo, a Caribbean coastal town in the Barahona Province of the Dominican Republic.

== See also ==
- Transport in Dominican Republic
- List of airports in Dominican Republic
