= Los Montones Field =

Los Montones Airport
- IATA: none; ICAO: MDLM

Summary
- Airport type: Public
- Location: San Cristóbal, Dominican Republic
- Elevation AMSL: 305 ft (93 m)
- Coordinates: 18°31′15″N 70°05′55″W

Map
- Location of the airport in Dominican Republic

Runways
Direction	Length		Surface
Direction	m	ft	Surface
12/30	910	2,986	Asphalt
- Sources: GCM Google Maps

Los Montones Airport is an airstrip 11 kilometres (7 mi) north of San Cristóbal, Dominican Republic.

There is rising terrain southwest through west of the runway.

The Higuero VOR/DME (Ident: HGR) is located 7.2 nautical miles (13.3 km) east-northeast of the airport.

== See also ==
- Transport in Dominican Republic
- List of airports in Dominican Republic
