= Azua Dominican Field =

Azua Dominica Airport
- IATA: none; ICAO: MDAD

Summary
- Airport type: Public
- Location: Azua, Dominican Republic
- Elevation AMSL: 122 ft / 37 m
- Coordinates: 18°25′28″N 70°43′45″W

Map
- Location of the airport in the Dominican Republic

Runways
Direction	Length		Surface
Direction	m	ft	Surface
10/28	510	1,673	Gravel
- Source: GCM Google Maps

Azua Dominica Airport is an airport 2 kilometres (1.2 mi) south of the city of Azua in the Azua Province of the Dominican Republic. It is an old airport that is used only for the emergency landing of domestic flights. This airport has never had regularly scheduled flights, although some airlines have operated charter or tourist flights here.

The Barahona VOR/DME (Ident: BHO) is located 24.9 nautical miles (46.1 km) west-southwest of the airport.

== See also ==
- Transport in Dominican Republic
- List of airports in Dominican Republic
