= Rail transport in the Dominican Republic =

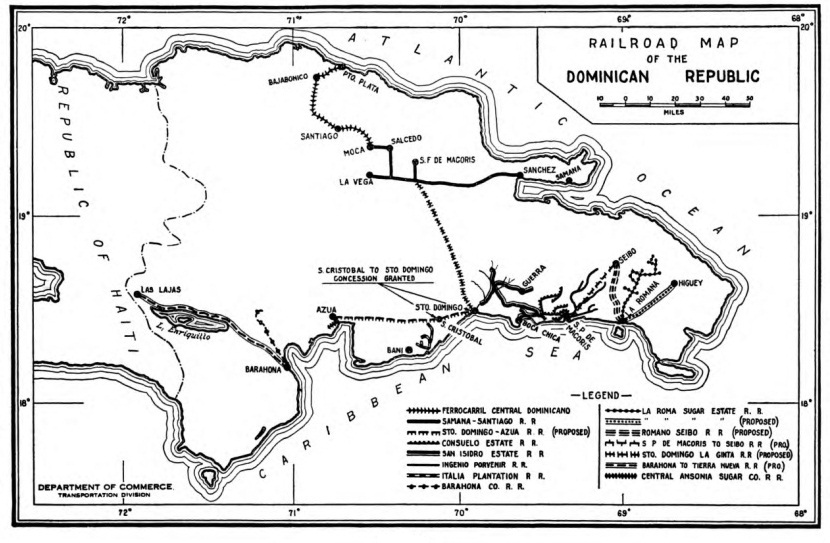
Rail map of 1925

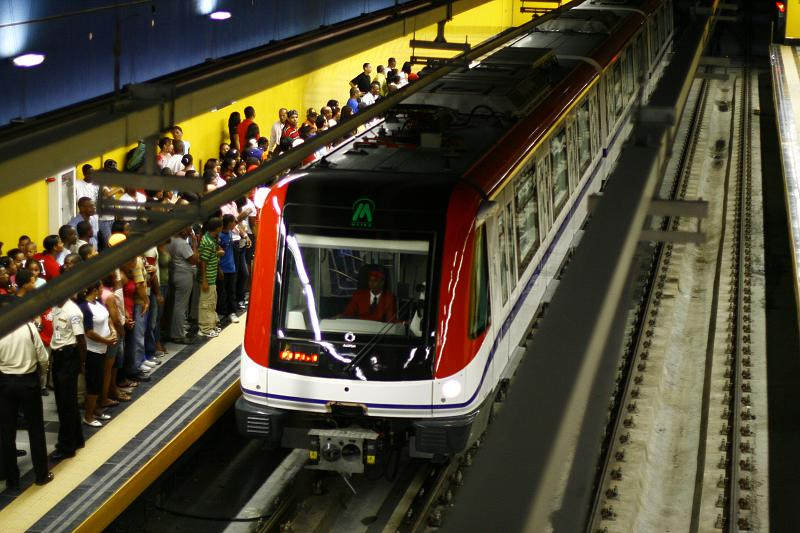
Juan Pablo Duarte station of Santo Domingo Metro

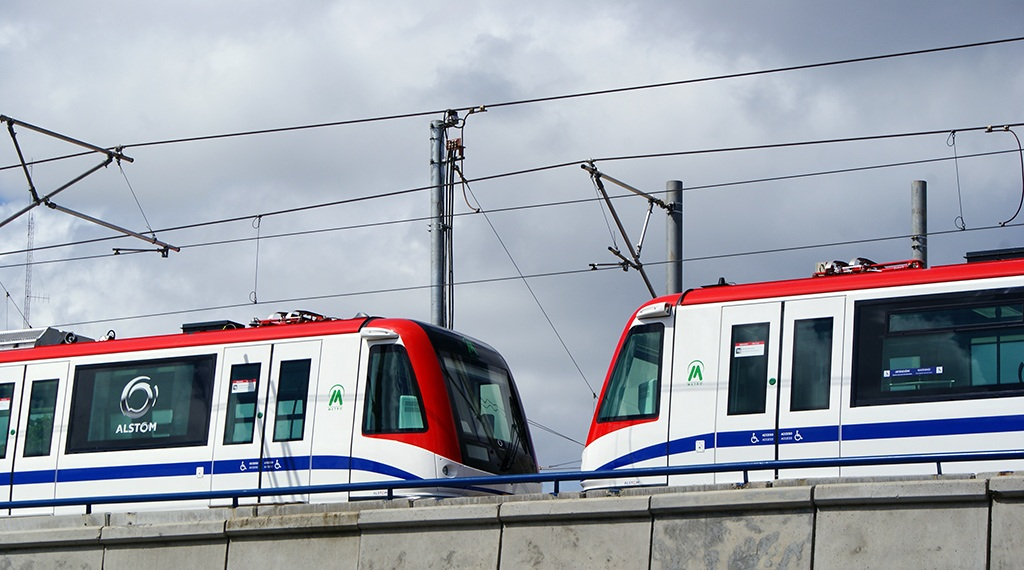
A couple of Alstom Metropolis 9000 Series used for Santo Domingo Metro

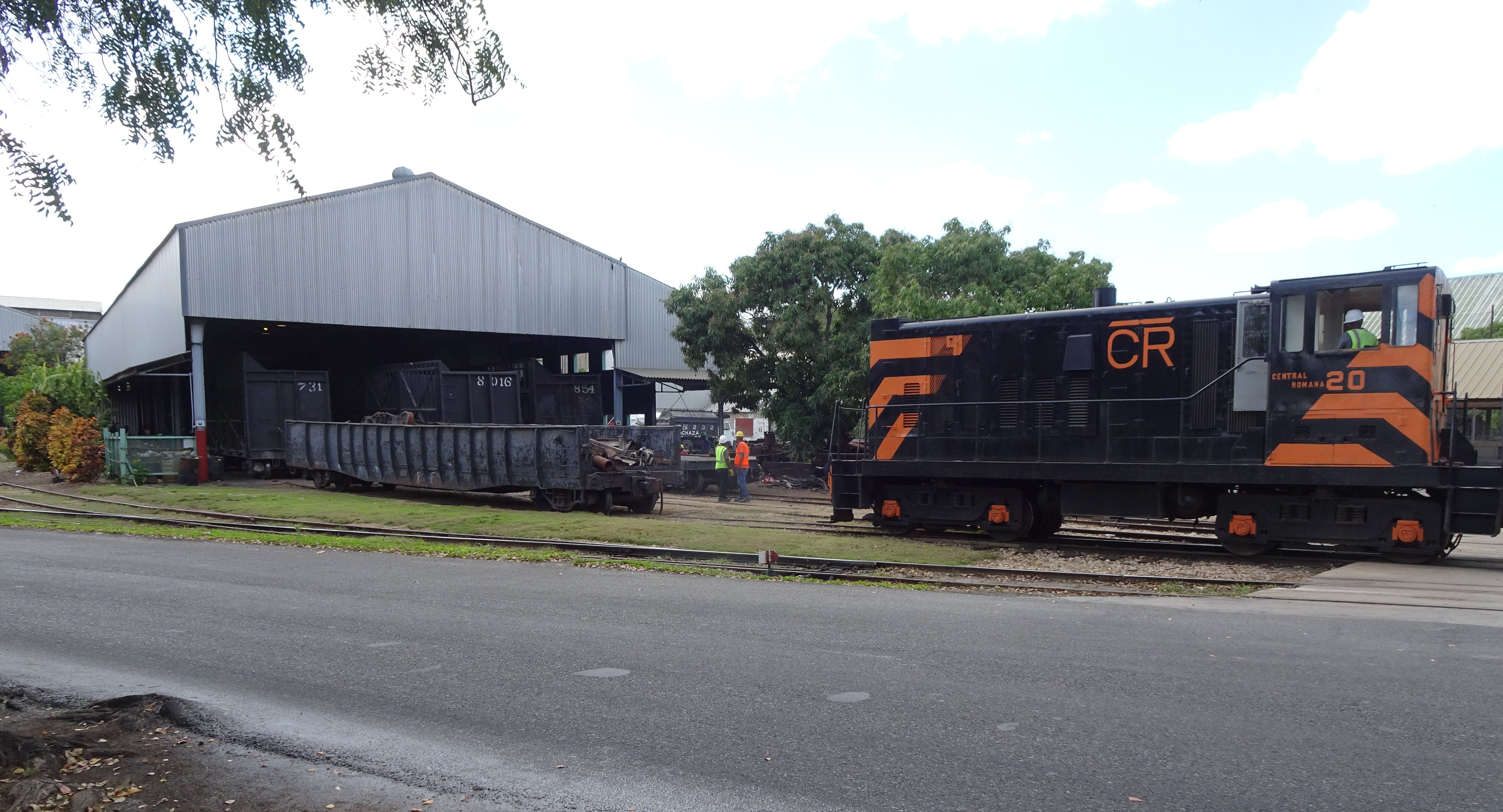
Trackage for the Central Romana sugarcane railroad. This line goes to the Zona Franca.

Rail transport in the Dominican Republic is provided by one state-owned operator and several private ones, mainly for sugar mills. There have never been any rail connections with neighbouring Haiti.

== History ==
Railroads in the Dominican Republic were planned as early as 1877 when the Dominican Government granted a concession for construction of an electric tramway between Santiago to Puerto Plata never constructed.

The first line (Ferrocarril Samaná-Santiago, with 1067 mm gauge), connecting Sánchez to La Vega with 79 kilometers (49.1 mi) long, started in 1881 and was opened on August 16, 1887. A branch of additional 13 kilometers (8.1 mi) long from La Gina to San Francisco de Macorís was opened in 1893. With a later 46 kilometres (28.6 mi) extension from Cabilla to Moca this railroad was enlarged to a network of 139 kilometres (86.4 mi).

The second line (Ferrocarril Central Dominicano, with 760 mm gauge), connecting Puerto Plata to Santiago with 82 kilometers (51.0 mi) long, started its construction in 1891 and was opened by President Lilís on August 16, 1897. Later a 27 kilometers (16.8 mi) extension for the Ferrocarril Central Dominicano (Dominican Central Railway) was started in 1906 between Santiago and Moca, being opened on October 24, 1909. This railway was fully owned and operated by the Dominican Government since 1908.

A northward branch for the Ferrocarril Samaná-Santiago (Samaná to Santiago Railway) connecting its main line from Cabuya to Salcedo was opened in 1909 and an extension between Salcedo and Moca was started in 1913, finally connecting the Samaná to Santiago Railway with the Dominican Central Railway in Moca on February 27, 1918.

There are plans for connecting Santo Domingo to Puerto Plata through Santiago de los Caballeros, but never materialized.

The Dominican Government bought in 1939 the Sánchez-La Vega main line and Cabuya-Moca branch of the Scottish-private owned Ferrocarril Samaná-Santiago and in 1944 took the remaining La Gina-San Francisco de Macorís branch.

Now in full possession of both Ferrocarril Samaná-Santiago and Ferrocarril Central Dominicano railway networks, in 1946 the Dominican State unificated both northern railways to made the state-owned United Dominican Railways (Ferrocarriles Unidos Dominicanos) 248 kilometers (154 mi)-long system. This system lacked of operational autonomy to use its revenues for maintenance and as results, the Puerto Plata-Santiago-Moca railway line was closed in 1951 and dismantled between 1955 and 1957, and the remaining network of Moca-Salcedo-Cabilla, La Gina-San Francisco de Macorís, and La Vega-Cabilla-La Gina-Sanchez lines were closed on February 3, 1976.

== System ==
=== National railways ===
The network consists of several lines, for freight and passenger transport, using several gauges. Due to the closure of some of them, during the 20th Century, the network has been partly reduced to a series of scattered branches, mainly concentrated around the cities of San Pedro de Macorís and La Romana.

The list below shows an overview about the original network:

- Central Romana Railroad was established in 1911 in the sugarcane fields. The total length of the line is 757 km (470 mi), 375 km (233 mi) being the 1,435 mm (4 ft 8 1/2 in) standard gauge.
- The Dominican Republic Government Railway (United Dominican Railways or Ferrocarriles Unidos Dominicanos) was a 139 km (86 mi) 1,067 mm (3 ft 6 in) narrow gauge railway. Now defunct.

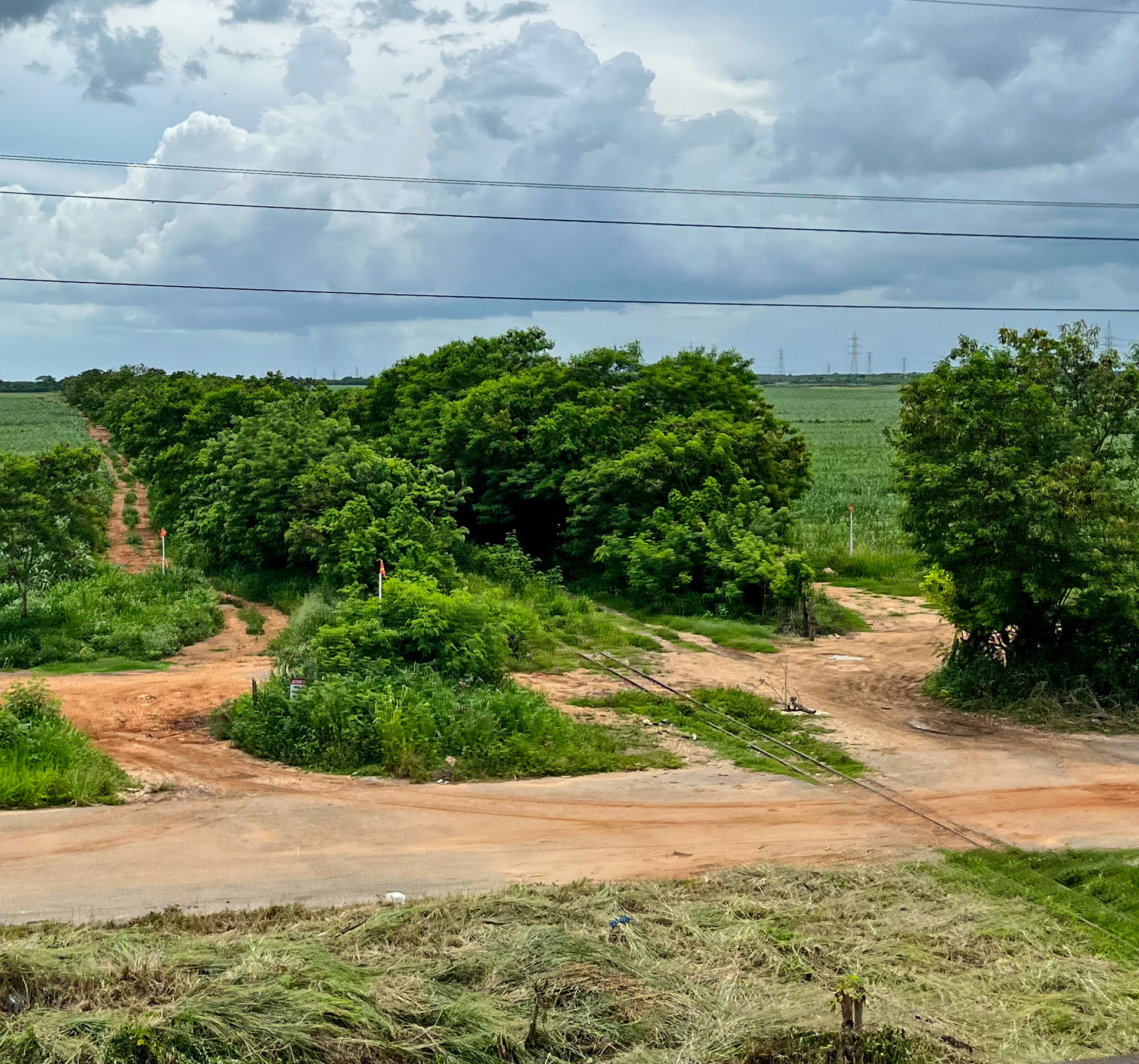
Narrow Gauge Sugar Cane railway in San Pedro de Macorís

- There are 240 km (149 mi) operated by other sugarcane companies in various gauges: 557 mm (21 15/16 in), 762 mm (2 ft 6 in), 1,067 mm (3 ft 6 in) gauges (1995).

=== Urban railways ===
The first rapid transit system opened in the state, inaugurated at the end of 2008, is a metro network serving the capital Santo Domingo. It consists of two lines for a total length of 27.4 km (17.0 mi), with planned expansion. A light rail system has been planned for Santiago de los Caballeros, the second Dominican city.

== See also ==
- Transport in the Dominican Republic
- Rail transport in Haiti
