= Jimani Field =

Jimani Airport
- IATA: none; ICAO: MDJI

Summary
- Airport type: Closed
- Serves: Jimani, Dominican Republic
- Elevation AMSL: 198 ft (60 m)
- Coordinates: 18°29′34″N 71°52′11″W

Map
- Location of the airport in the Dominican Republic

Runways
Direction	Length		Surface
Direction	m	ft	Surface
Closed
- GCM Google Maps

Jimani Airport (ICAO: MDJI) was an airstrip serving Jimani, Independencia, Dominican Republic.

Google Earth Historical Imagery (2/11/2002) shows an 870 metres (2,850 ft) sand runway paralleling Highway 46 near the southeastern shore of Lake Azuéi. The (1/12/2010) image shows the lake had risen and inundated the runway. Current (10/24/2016) imagery shows the lake has risen further and the runway is completely under water.

== See also ==
- Transport in the Dominican Republic
- List of airports in the Dominican Republic
