= Baigua Field =

Baigua Airport
- IATA: none; ICAO: MDBG

Summary
- Airport type: Closed
- Serves: La Altagracia
- Location: Baigue, Dominican Republic
- Elevation AMSL: 302 ft / 92 m
- Coordinates: 18°31′57″N 68°40′10″W

Map
- Location of the airport in the Dominican Republic

Runways
Direction	Length		Surface
Direction	m	ft	Surface
Closed
- Source: AIP GCM Google Maps

Baigua Airfield (ICAO: MDBG) is a small domestic airport located in the eastern La Altagracia Province of the Dominican Republic. Situated at coordinates 18°31’56.94” N, 068°40’11.46” W at an elevation of 92 meters (301.76 feet) above sea level, the facility operates strictly during daylight hours (HJ) under the direct authority of the Dominican Institute of Civil Aviation (IDAC). The airfield features a single caliche-surfaced runway designated 09/27, measuring 850 meters long by 24 meters wide and rated for Single Isolated Wheel Load (SIWL) aircraft operations. It is within the Santo Domingo Flight Information Region (FIR), the airport relies on the nearby La Romana VOR/DME station (Ident: LRN), located 14.6 nautical miles to the west-southwest, for regional navigation.

== Description ==
It is located in the La Altagracia Province of the Dominican Republic and situated at coordinates 18°31’56.94” N, 068°40’11.46” W. Operating strictly during daylight hours (HJ), the airfield falls under the direct authority of the Dominican Institute of Civil Aviation (Instituto Dominicano de Aviación Civil — IDAC). The facility sits at an elevation of 92 meters (301.76 feet) above sea level and features a single runway with a caliche surface oriented 09/27. The runway measures 850 meters in length by 24 meters in width and is rated for Single Isolated Wheel Load (SIWL) aircraft operations, with no additional operational restrictions or remarks noted.

Its ICAO airport code MDBG and operates within the Santo Domingo Flight Information Region which manages the local civil airspace traffic across the eastern plains of the country. The facility centers precisely at latitude 18.53240 and longitude -68.67000. The La Romana VOR/DME (Ident: LRN) is 14.6 nautical miles (27.0 km) west-southwest of the runway.

== See also ==
- Transport in Dominican Republic
- List of airports in Dominican Republic
