= Larimar =

Blue gemstone from Dominican Republic

Larimar (Blue Pectolite)
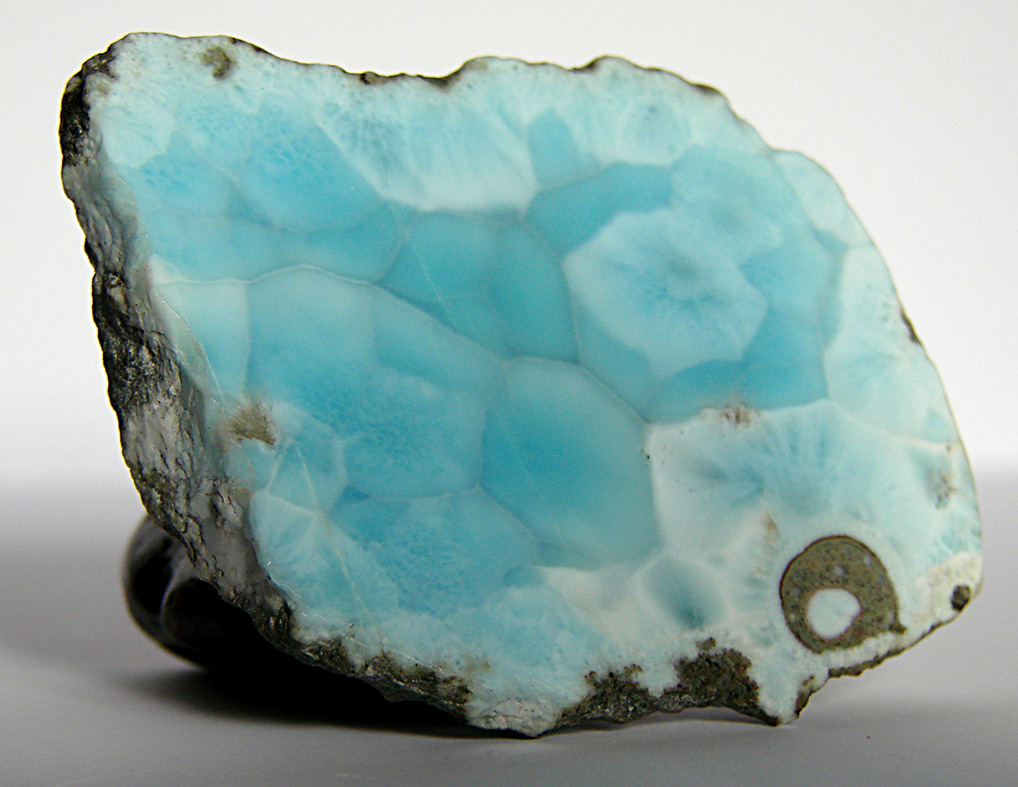
- Larimar specimen from Dominican Republic

General
- Category: Inosilicate mineral
- Formula: NaCa_{2}Si_{3}O_{8}(OH)
- Crystal system: Triclinic
- Crystal class: Pinacoidal (1̅) (same H-M symbol)
- Space group: P1̅
- Unit cell: a = 7.99 Å, b = 7.03 Å, c = 7.03 Å; α = 90.51°, β = 95.21°, γ = 102.53°; Z = 2

Identification
- Color: Shades of blue, blue-green
- Crystal habit: Tabular to acicular, radiating fibrous, spheroidal, or columnar; massive
- Twinning: Twin axis [010] with composition plane [100], common
- Cleavage: Perfect on {100} and {001}
- Fracture: Uneven
- Tenacity: Brittle; tough when compact
- Mohs scale hardness: 4.5 - 5
- Luster: Silky, subvitreous
- Diaphaneity: Translucent to opaque
- Specific gravity: 2.84 - 2.90
- Optical properties: Biaxial (+)
- Refractive index: n_{α} = 1.594 - 1.610 n_{β} = 1.603 - 1.614 n_{γ} = 1.631 - 1.642
- Birefringence: δ = 0.037
- 2V angle: Measured: 50° to 63°, Calculated: 42° to 60°
- Dispersion: r > v weak to very strong

Larimar is the tradename for a rare blue variety of the silicate mineral pectolite found only in the Dominican Republic, around the city of Barahona. Its coloration varies from bluish white, light-blue, light-green, teal, green-blue, turquoise blue, turquoise green, turquoise blue-green, deep green, dark green, to deep blue, dark blue and purple, violet and indigo and the larimar can come in many varieties and color mixes.

== History ==
Dominican Republic's Ministry of Mining records show that Father Miguel Domingo Fuertes Loren of the Barahona Parish requested permission on 22 November 1916 to explore and exploit the mine of a certain blue rock that he had discovered. Pectolites were not yet known in Dominican Republic, and the request was rejected.

Miguel Méndez and Peace Corps volunteer Norman Rilling rediscovered Larimar in 1974 on a beach at the foot of the Bahoruco Mountain Range, the coastal province of Barahona. Natives believed that the stone came from the sea, and they called the gem Blue Stone. Méndez took his young daughter's name Larissa and the Spanish word for sea (mar) and formed Larimar, to suggest the colors of the Caribbean Sea where it was found. The few stones that they found were alluvial sediment, washed into the sea by the Bahoruco River. An upstream search revealed the in situ outcrops in the range and soon the Los Chupaderos mine was formed.

== Geology ==
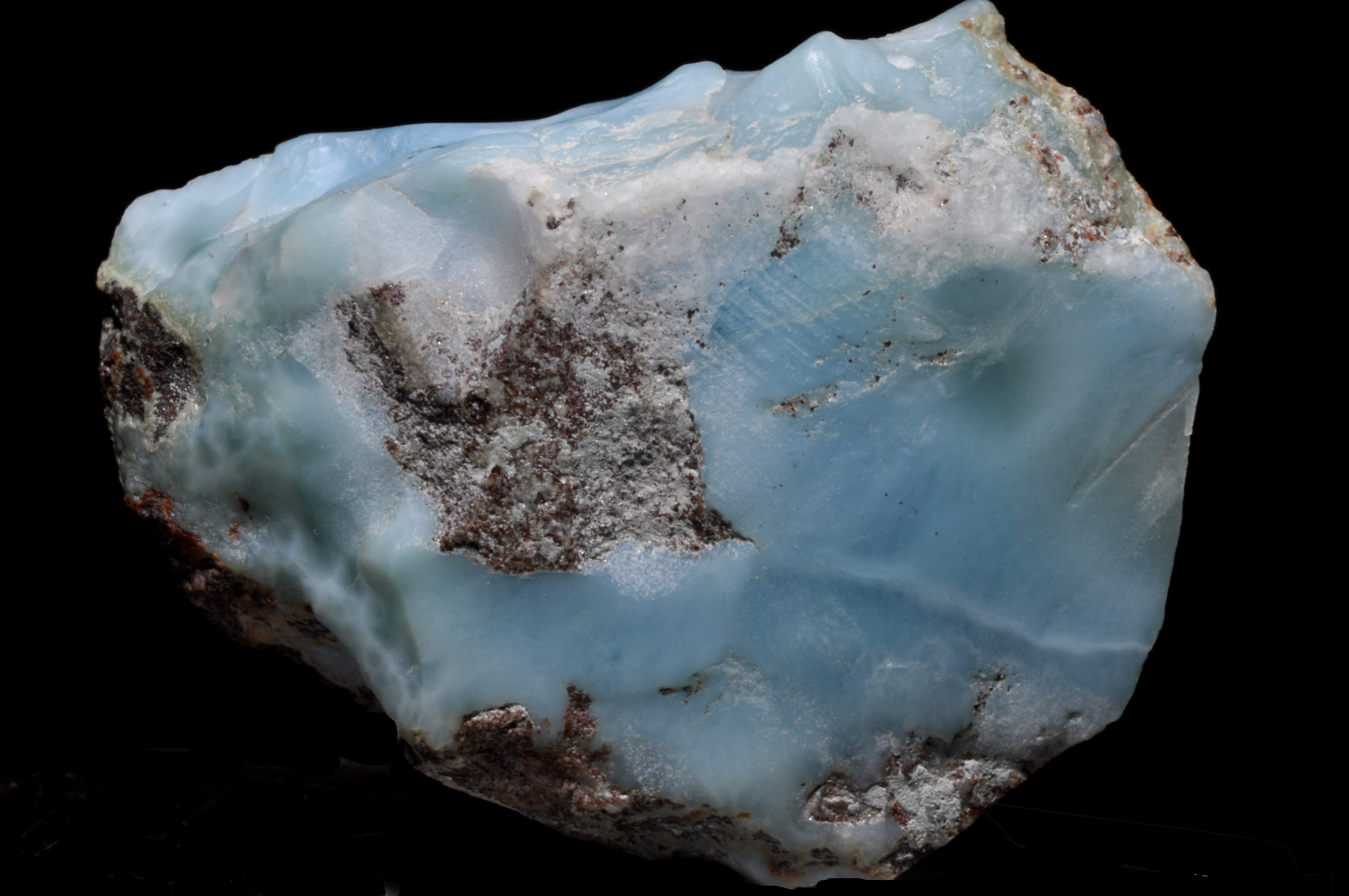
Rough Larimar

Larimar is a type of pectolite or a rock composed largely of pectolite, an acid silicate hydrate of calcium and sodium. Pectolite is found in many locations, but larimar has a unique volcanic blue coloration, which is the result of copper substitution for calcium.

Miocene volcanic rocks, andesites and basalts, erupted within the limestones of the south coast of the island. These rocks contained cavities or vugs which were later filled with a variety of minerals, including the blue pectolite. These pectolite cavity fillings are a secondary occurrence within the volcanic flows, dikes, and plugs. When these rocks erode, the pectolite fillings are carried down the slope to end up in the alluvium and the beach gravels. The Bahoruco River carried the pectolite-bearing sediments to the sea. The tumbling action along the streambed provided the natural polishing to the blue larimar, which makes them stand out in contrast to the dark gravels of the streambed.

=== Los Chupaderos ===
The most important outcrop of blue pectolite is located at Los Chupaderos in the section of Los Checheses, about 10 km (6.2 mi) southwest of the city of Barahona in the southwestern region of Dominican Republic. It is a single mountainside now perforated with approximately 2,000 vertical shafts, surrounded by rainforest vegetation and deposits of blue-colored mine tailings.

== Jewelry ==
Larimar jewelry is offered to the public in Dominican Republic, and elsewhere in the Caribbean as a local specialty. Most jewelry produced is set in silver, but sometimes high-grade larimar is also set in gold.

Quality grading is according to coloration and the typical mineral crystal configuration in the stone. Larimar also comes in green and can have red spots, brown strikes, etc., due to the presence of other minerals or oxidation. The more intense the blue color and the contrast in the stone, the higher and rarer is the quality. The blue color is photosensitive and fades with time if exposed to too much light and heat.

Dominican jewelry designers such as Mónica Varela and Joarla Caridad have contributed to the popularization of larimar internationally.

== See also ==
- List of minerals
- List of minerals named after people
