= Shire of Barron =

Former local government area in Queensland

Coordinates: 16.823°S 145.636°E

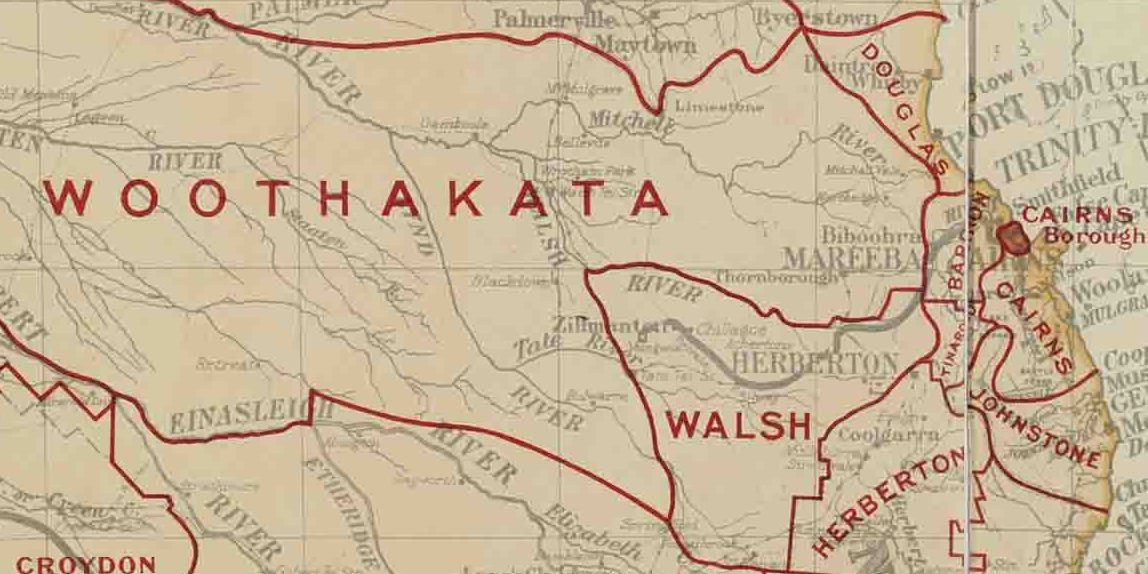
Map of Barron Division and adjacent local government areas, March 1902

The Shire of Barron is a former local government area in Far North Queensland, Queensland, Australia. It existed between 1890 and 1919.

== History ==
Under the Divisional Boards Act 1879, the Cairns Division, Hinchinbrook Division and Woothakata Division were created on 11 November 1879. On 3 September 1881, parts of each of these three divisions were excised to create the new Tinaroo Division. In 1889, residents of the No. 3 subdivision of Tinnaroo Division began to agitate for an independent division. On 20 December 1890, part of the Tinaroo Division was excised to create the new Barron Division.

With the passage of the Local Authorities Act 1902, the Barron Division became the Shire of Barron on 31 March 1903.

On 20 December 1919, the Shire of Barron was abolished and was split between the Shires of Cairns and Woothakata.

== Chairmen ==
- 1903: C P Andersen
- 1904: William Walter Mason
- 1905: Robert W Warren
- 1906: Dr. David Thomatis
- 1907: Charles Strattman
- 1908: William Walter Mason
- 1909: William Walter Mason
