= Walterio Field =

Walterio Airport
- IATA: none; ICAO: MDWO

Summary
- Airport type: Public
- Serves: Monte Cristi, Dominican Republic
- Elevation AMSL: 33 ft / 10 m
- Coordinates: 19°45′25″N 71°37′30″W

Map
- Location of the airport in the Dominican Republic

Runways
Direction	Length		Surface
Direction	m	ft	Surface
05/23	890	2,920	Gravel
- Source: GCM Google Maps

Walterio Airfield (ICAO: MDWO) is a small domestic airport located in the Monte Cristi Province of the Dominican Republic, operating near the country's northwestern coast. Positioned at coordinates 19°45’28.32” N, 071°37’24.54” W, the facility functions exclusively during daylight hours (HJ) under the jurisdiction of the (Instituto Dominicano de Aviación Civil).

The airfield sits at an elevation of 10 meters (32.8 feet) above sea level and features a single caliche-surfaced runway designated internationally as 05/23, which measures 600 meters long by 8 meters wide and is rated for Single Isolated Wheel Load (SIWL) operations.

== Description ==
It is located in the Monte Cristi Province of the Dominican Republic situated at coordinates 19°45’28.32” N, 071°37’24.54” W that operates strictly during daylight hours (HJ) under the authority of the Instituto Dominicano de Aviación Civil featuring a 600-meter by 8-meter caliche surface runway at an elevation of 10 meters (32.8 feet) above sea level with a Single Isolated Wheel Load resistance and no active operational restrictions.

The facility located at 19.75790 and longitude -71.62350 under the official ICAO airport code MDWO, featuring an active runway designated internationally as 05/23. The airfield's operations are coordinated within the Port-au-Prince Flight Information Region (FIR).

The Monte Cristi non-directional beacon (Ident: MTC) is located 6.5 nautical miles (12.0 km) north of the airport. The Cap Haitien VOR/DME (Ident: HCN) is located 32.4 nautical miles (60.0 km) west of Walterio Airport.

== See also ==
- Transport in Dominican Republic
- List of airports in Dominican Republic
