= David Thomatis =

Italian educator and agriculturalist

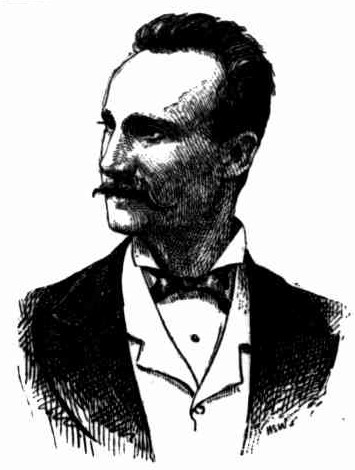
Dr David Thomatis (c. 1889)

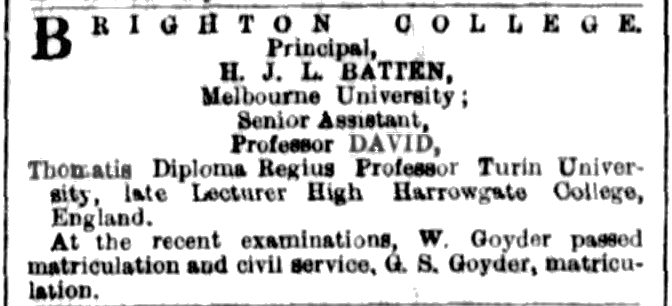
Advertisement for Brighton College, The Argus, 30 December 1875

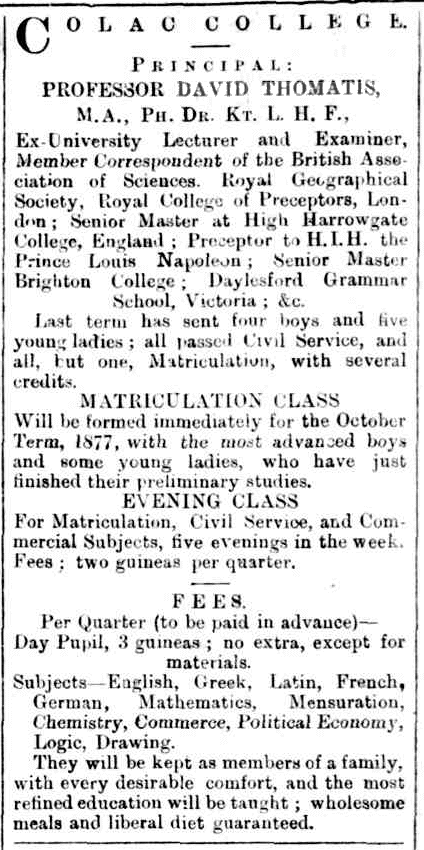
Advertisement for Colac College, Colac Herald, 9 March 1877

David Thomatis (2 August 1851 – 14 December 1919) was an Italian-born Australian educator and agriculturalist. At the turn of the 19th to 20th century he developed in a plantation in today's Caravonica near Cairns, north-eastern Australia, a strain of cotton named Caravonica Cotton which was marketed successfully around the world. For some years until 1909 he served as an alderman in the Barron Shire Council, where he was chairman in 1906.

== Life ==
Dr David Thomatis was born at Maro Castello, which in the 1920s became a part (frazione) of Borgomaro in today's northwestern Italian province of Liguria. His father was a descendant of the branch of the Douglas family which elected to follow Charles Edward Stuart (1720–1788), aka "Bonnie Prince Charlie" or "The Young Pretender" to Italy, and thereby forfeited his estates in Scotland. He married into the Thomatis-Caravonica family, which originated from Greece. Dr. Thomatis was the youngest of his family, and was educated in English schools. He graduated with honors in arts and sciences in the University of Turin when 19 years of age. He won a first-class diploma in the Royal Technical Institute, and was soon afterward appointed Professor of Technology, Political Economy, and the English Language, and made a member of the Geographical and Agricultural Societies. In 1870 he was elected a vice-president of the General Congress of Agriculturists in Florence, where he expounded his system of agricultural mutual credit. He was one of the directors of the first agricultural bank in Italy. He was appointed tutor to the Prince Imperial, and resided for some time in England, and traveled in Russia and Finland. There he was almost frozen to death during a severe winter at the top of the Gulf of Bothnia. In 1875 he landed in Sydney from the steamship SS St. Osyth, having been a fellow-passenger with Andrew Goldie (1840–1891), the Scottish New Guinea explorer. Dr. Thomatis was offered a prominent position in the colony proposed to be founded in New Ireland in New Guinea by the Marquis de Rays. The project collapsed, though. Thus far a biography of Thomatis as published in 1898 in the Australian Town and Country Journal of Sydney, probably based on information provided by Thomatis himself. The veracity of his academic degrees obtained in Turin is doubted. In retrospect even his character as a whole was drawn into question.

The arrival of the SS St. Osyth in Sydney was within the first days of July 1875. Thomatis must have been among the third class passengers, as he was not mentioned in the list of passengers of the first two classes, like Mr. Goldie. Thomatis did not stay long in Sydney, if he had not, as a matter of fact, alighted already at the halt of the St. Osyth in Melbourne late in June. By the end of July there was a report that he was with a fellow Italian, a Mr Aquarone, and several Italian labourers in Melbourne, examining settlement opportunities for Italians. He was introduced as a "professor of commerce and practical chemistry of a Royal industrial institute, and afterwards director of agricultural societies, president of a congress in Florence, and secretary of an agricultural bank".

According to shipping notices he arrived anew in Melbourne in December 1875. By the end of the month he was advertised as the senior assistant to the principal of "Brighton College". His credentials given there were "Diploma Regius Professor Turin University" and "late Lecturer Harrowgate College, England". It was a short-lived appointment, because by July 1876 the Ballarat Grammar School advertised that it had "secured the services of Prof. David Thomatis, a first class Mathematical and Classical Scholar". It was also said that he was prepared to receive a limited number of boarders. By March 1877 the "Colac College" advertised itself with Principal Professor David Thomatis, M.A., Ph. Dr. Kt. L H.F. In August 1878 it was noted that the council of Colac dealt with a complaint of Thomatis about the footpath in front of the college.

Thomatis stayed on and married in 1879 Marie Theresa Heley, the youngest daughter of Colonel John Michael Healy and was made headmaster at the grammar school of Rockhampton in Queensland. In July 1881 he arrived in Townsville and started a grammar school there.

About 1884 he had moved to Cairns where ca. 12 kilometres north he purchased a tract of land 800 acres in size which he named Caravonica Park, after a small town close to his birthplace. Initially there he grew banana, maize, rice, ginger, etc. The land was located between the Barron River, where it had a frontage of 1.5 miles, and Thomatis Creek, the ranges and the sea coast in the north eastern corner, where it touched Trinity Bay, from where Thomatis Creek runs inland. It had a new railway running beside it. The soil consisted of 10 feet of black alluvial loam of mostly organic matter on top of pure sea gravel. Initially he leased portions of the land from Chinese farmers who had holdings of in average ten acres and mostly grew bananas. Thomatis experimented with growing rice, bananas, sugar, oranges, mangos, coconuts, etc. Tobacco was another unsuccessful crop, as the leaves turned out too coarse due to heat and rain.

After his wife Marie Theresa died on 26 Jul 1886, Thomatis married Rachel Ellen Wallis (b. 1862 as daughter of Nathaniel Wallis and Mary Ann Turner) on 21 Mar 1888 in Sydney. At that time he also was headmaster of the Centennial College in Petersham there. This college apparently disappeared sometime in 1891.

=== Cotton farming ===
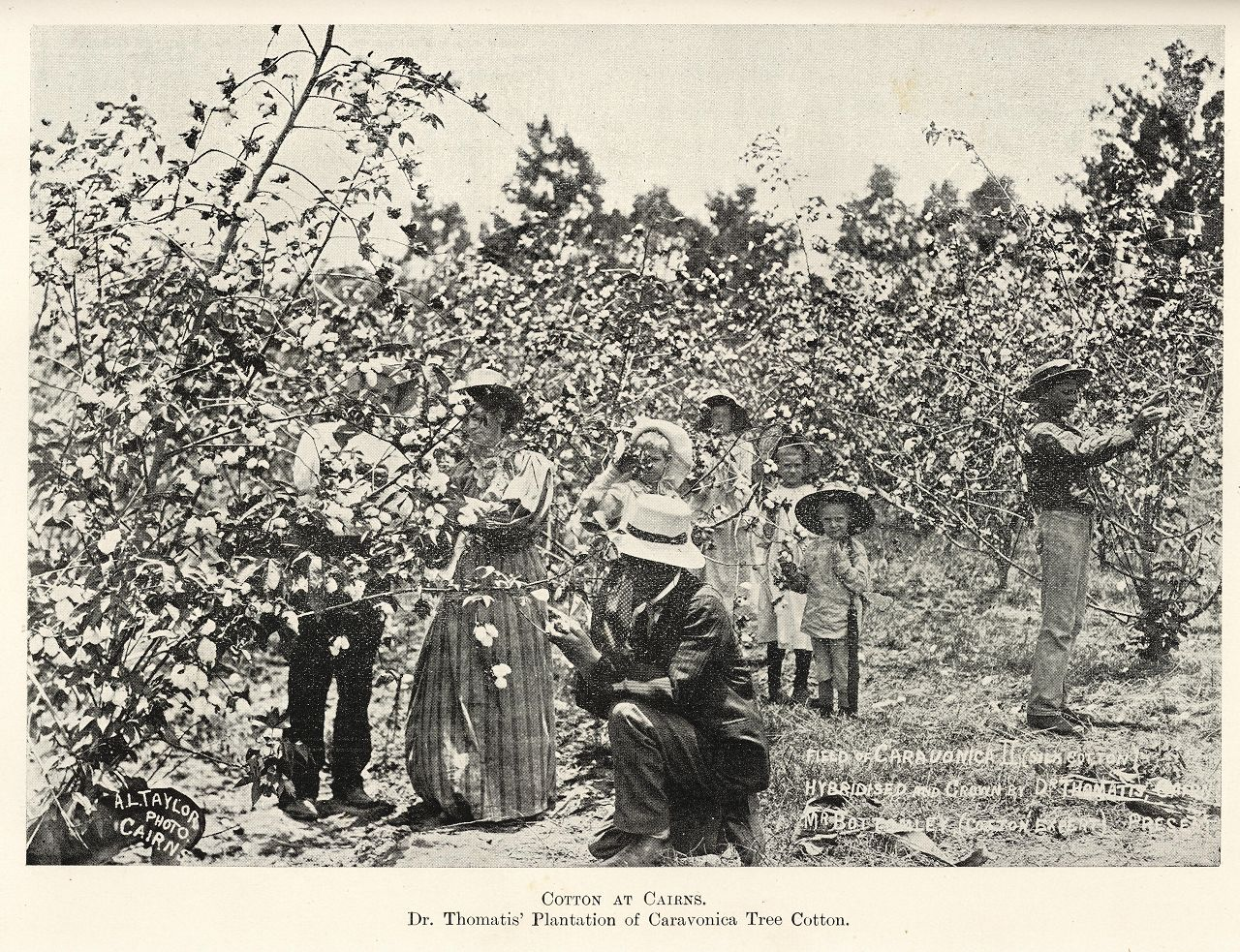
Plantation Caravonica Park (1906)

Inspired by finding some remnants of earlier cotton planting by some Chinese he found on his land he also began experimenting with this crop. This resulted in a tree cotton which would be grown as Caravonica Cotton and had three varieties:

- The original Caravonica, Caravonica I, or Wood Cotton. Presumably created by crossing two kinds of Sea Island Cotton a Mexican variety and a variety from the upper Amazon River.
- Caravonica II, or Sillk Cotton, presumably a cross between Wood Cotton and a rough Peruvian kidney cotton.
- Alpaca Cotton, or Kidney Cotton, which essentially seemed to have been Peruvian kidney cotton.

It was created with a view that freight costs from Australia would give it a handicap on world markets and therefore it should have a higher weight of lint compared to the seed. Caravonica Cotton produced about 45% lint, compared to about a third of the American varieties. This tree cotton was grown as a perennial plant and grew inside eight years up to a height of two to two-and-a-half metres. In 1906 the first sales of Caravonica Cotton were made in Liverpool, England.

In April 1909 he finalised the sale of his interests to Baumwolle Akt. Ges. zu Berlin, a German group around Baron Curt von Grunan, Baron Wener von Grunan and Dr. Marcus. But the company was already then in financial disarray in it was liquidated by the end of 1911, By the end of the following decade they should have sold the Caravonica property onward. Thence it should decline due to the fall of prices, absence of state support and the lack of cheap labour. Globally, Caravonica Cotton, which was also grown in the Americas and Africa, fell into disuse, because annual varieties were less prone to disease than tree cotton.

=== Later years in Mexico and the Dominican Republic ===
By invitation of the Mexican government he operated alongside other professional foreigners a tropical agricultural experimental station in Tapanatepec in the southern province of Oaxia, where he arrived ca. 1910. By 1913 he claimed to have discovered two hitherto unknown species of rubber plants. He praised the respect for science in Mexico that he has experienced by both sides in the ongoing revolution there, who left him and his family unmolested. The rebel leader even paid him a visit and safeguarded his residence, while all the other houses were burnt down.

Probably in 1916, possibly earlier, he arrived in Barahona, Dominican Republic, where he established a cotton farm, the Algodonal Caravónica in the location Bahoruco. A fire destroyed three dwellings (bohíos) on his property in December 1916. In May 1918 information was provided, that his wife Rachel Ellen, née Wallis, born 1859 in New South Wales, whom he married on 21 March 1888 in Sydney, has died in Barahona on 7 May 1917, aged 54 years and 7 months. On the occasion she was described as the "youngest daughter of the famous English General Sir William P. Wallis", ie. Sir Provo William Parry Wallis. However, it is more likely her parents were Nathaniel Wallis (1820 in Deptford, Kent, England - 1894 in Sydney) and Mary Anne, née Turner, (1824 - 17/10/1891 in Sydney) In the same newspaper article his first wife, supposedly the aforementioned Marietta "Marie" Theresa, née Healy, born 1850 in Bangor, New South Wales, was referred to as "a sister of Lord Roberts, Earl of Pretoria and Baron of Kandahar, probably referring to Frederick Roberts, 1st Earl Roberts. In fact, she was the daughter of John Michael Healy and Ellen Josephine, née Temple. When his second wife died, she was survived by their children Ethel (14/01/1895 - 1966), Victoria (10/04/1897 - 1951), Blanca (11/07/1891 - 1976) and John (09/03/1900 - 1919), who lived in San Francisco at the time. Another brother of theirs, David (18/12/1893 - 1893) died at birth or soon thereafter and was laid to rest in the grave of Marie Theresa at Cairns Pioneer Cemetery. Dr. David Thomatis reportedly died himself December 1919 in the Dominican Republic from the Spanish flu.
