= Osvaldo Virgil Airport =

Osvaldo Virgil Airport El Montecristi Airport
- IATA: none; ICAO: MDMC

Summary
- Airport type: Public
- Serves: Monte Cristi, Dominican Republic
- Elevation AMSL: 57 ft / 17 m
- Coordinates: 19°51′55″N 71°38′43″W

Map
- Location of the airport in the Dominican Republic

Runways
Direction	Length		Surface
Direction	m	ft	Surface
05/23	1,180	3,871	Asphalt
- Source: GCM Google Maps

Osvaldo Virgil National Airport (ICAO: MDMC), also known as Monte Cristi Airport, is a domestic airfield in the Monte Cristi Province of the Dominican Republic, named after the country's first Major League Baseball player. Operated by the Dominican Air Force (Fuerza Aérea Dominicana) strictly during daylight hours (HJ), the facility features a single 1,110-meter asphalt runway (05/23) rated for Single Isolated Wheel Load (SIWL) aircraft. Located near the northwestern border at an elevation of 35 meters (114.8 feet), the airport manages its airspace traffic within the Port-au-Prince Flight Information Region and hosts an on-field non-directional beacon (Ident: MTC) for regional navigation.

== Etymology ==
The airport is named after baseball player Ozzie Virgil Sr.

== Description ==
It is located in the Monte Cristi Province of the Dominican Republic, situated at coordinates 19°51’55” N, 071°38’43” W. The aerodrome falls under the direct jurisdiction of the Dominican Air Force (Fuerza Aérea Dominicana) and operates strictly during daylight hours (HJ). Positioned at an elevation of 35 meters (114.8 feet) above sea level, the airfield features a single asphalt runway oriented 23/05. The runway measures 1,110 meters in length by 23 meters in width and is fully rated for Single Isolated Wheel Load (SIWL) aircraft operations, with no additional operational restrictions or remarks noted. Its ICAO airport code is MDMC, and it operates within the Port-au-Prince Flight Information Region.

The Cap Haitien VOR/DME (Ident: HCN) is 32.2 nautical miles (59.6 km) west-southwest of the airport. The Monte Cristi non-directional beacon (Ident: MTC) is on the field.

== See also ==
- Transport in Dominican Republic
- List of airports in Dominican Republic
