= Santiago Light Rail =

Planned light rail system in the Dominican Republic

The Santiago Light Rail, branded Monorriel, is an under construction monorail system in Santiago de los Caballeros, Dominican Republic. It will be the first monorail system in the Caribbean. It is being developed by the Fideicomiso para el Desarrollo del Sistema de Transporte Masivo (FITRAM), and implemented by a consortium led by Alstom. The planned 12.8 km (8.0 mi) corridor will consist of 14 stations, and is planned to be completed by 2027-28.

== History ==
The Santiago Light Rail, an urban rapid transit project planned for the city of Santiago de los Caballeros, was awarded to the Spanish railway company Ferrocarriles Españoles de Vía Estrecha (FEVA) in 2007. The line was slated to be 22 km (14 mi) long with 12 stations. The construction, which was originally scheduled to begin in August 2007, did not commence as planned. After a long hiatus, the monorail project was announced in March 2022 by president Luis Abinader. The project, which was being executed by the government owned Fideicomiso para el Desarrollo del Sistema de Transporte Masivo (FITRAM), was awarded to a consortium led by Alstom in August 2023. It will be the first monorail system in the Caribbean. The project is implemented at a cost of €500 million, with Alstom's contract estimated at around €370 million, and the project is implemented with the support of the French government.

== Network and infrastructure ==
During its announcement in March 2022, the Santiago Monorail was planned as a fully elevated rapid transit corridor traversing a 15 km (9.3 mi) route across the city with 16 stations. As per FITRAM, the final planned route extended for 12.8 km (8.0 mi) from Cienfuegos to Beijing with 14 stations. The project was planned to be executed in two phases, with the first phase involving nine stations from Cienfuegos to Las Carreras Shopping Center, which will be the location of the Central station. The second phase will consist of the remaining five stations. The central station will connect the monorail system with the other public transportation and the Santiago Cable Car. There will also be commercial development at the central station. A 57,000 m^{2} (610,000 sq ft) garage cum workshop would be established between the Espaillat and La Plazona stations for the maintenance and parking of the rakes. The entire project is planned to be completed by 2027-28. The route follows mainly pre-existing streets starting with Av. Circunvalacíon Norte, then following Av. Tamboril, cutting through a neighborhood in Espaillat, continuing over Av. Longitudinal and Av. Imbert. Av. 27 de Febrero is parralled into the downtown area where the route uses Av. Las Carreras near the Monumento de Santiago. The route briefly parallels Autopista Juan Pablo Duarte before cutting through Pontificia Universidad Católica Madre y Maestra (PUCMM). The route then remains on Av. Salvador Estrella Sadhalá.

The project is being executed by the SIF Consortium consisting of Alstom and Sofratesa. The system will use the Innovia Monorail 300 trainsets manufactured by Alstom. Alstom will supply 13 automated trainsets, with each trainset consisting of four carriages with a capacity to carry 145 passengers each. The company will also be responsible for the entire implementation, testing, and deployment of the project. Alstom will also provide automatic signalling, track switching systems, depot equipments, and power supply infrastructure. The system will use a reversible power supply system which will use regenerative braking.

== Services ==
The trains will operate at a maximum speed of 80 km/h (50 mph). The trains will run every 90 seconds during peak hours, and will take approximately 30 to 35 minutes to cover the journey one way. The monorail system is designed to carry up to 20,000 passengers per hour per direction.

== See also ==
- Santo Domingo Metro
- Rail transport in the Dominican Republic
