= Nacho Barahona =

Spanish film editor

Nacho Barahona (born in Madrid - 1970) is a Spanish film editor with over 225 TV series episodes, 14 short films, numerous advertisements and 3 documentaries to his credit, as well as 8 nominations and awards in film-making.

== Biography ==
Barahona received a bachelor's degree in software engineering, at Madrid's Polytechnic University. He went to work as computer programmer and systems analyst in videogames, telecommunications and banking for large companies.

Attracted by the huge development of graphical applications and CAD, a career change resulted in training first as an advertisement graphic designer and graphic designer for multi-media platforms, interactive sites and virtual simulators, working with various Spanish universities.

In 1996, Barahona learned more about using Avid as a non-linear editing tool, and redirected his professional career towards editing in the world of advertising, collaborating with production companies such as 'Molinare', 'Dalton's Digital Brothers', 'Videospot', 'Full Fiction', 'Escosura', 'Videoreport', 'Propaganda Moviebox', 'Viva Video', 'Alaska Producciones', 'Genlock videoproducciones', 'Exa', '101', 'Telson', 'Resonancia Madrid', 'Com 4 hd' or 'Iconica'.

In 1998, he came into contact with TV fiction through the production company Globomedia (market leader in South America and second in Europe), and developed his career as a cinematographic editor, working on several of the most successful primetime Spanish TV series such as '7 vidas (Telecinco)', 'Javier ya no vive solo' (Telecinco), 'Los Serrano' (Telecinco), 'Compañeros (Antena 3)' and 'Policías, en el corazón de la calle' (Antena 3).

In 2004 he was signed up with the production company Videomedia to work on 'Lobos' (Antena 3) and 'Hospital Central' (Telecinco). After three successful seasons, in December, 2005 he was signed up with the production company Sony Pictures Television International to work on 'Los simuladores', Spanish remake of the successful Argentine series for channel Cuatro.

== Filmography ==
=== Television ===
Year	TV Series	Network	Seasons	Episodes
1998-2000	Compañeros	Antena 3	5	56
1999-1999	7 Vidas	Telecinco	1	13
2000-2001	Policías, en el corazón de la calle	Antena 3	5	55
2001-2003	Javier ya no vive solo	Telecinco	2	27
2003-2004	Los Serrano	Telecinco	4	51
2004-2005	Lobos	Antena 3	1	3
2005-2006	Hospital Central	Telecinco	2	9
2006-2007	Los simuladores	Cuatro	1	11

=== Short films ===
Year	Feature	Director
2003	Stand by	Hugo Stuven Casasnovas
2003	Perro	Manuel Feijóo
2001	Hilo de melancolía	Hugo Stuven Casasnovas
2001	Calor de agosto	Ricardo Alvarez Solla
2001	Cachito mío	Manuel Feijóo
2000	Quieres jugar?	Arturo Iglesias
2000	La foto	Ricardo Alvarez Solla
1999	Sonidos en silencio	Enrique Sotomayor
1999	Tres locos	Pablo Romero
1999	La última parada (lo peor de todo)	Ricardo Alvarez Solla
1999	El sotano	Hugo Stuven Casasnovas
1999	Llamaba para despedirme	Manuel Feijóo
1998	Perdón, perdón	Manuel Ríos San Martín
1998	Fiebre	Roberto Berrío
