= María Montez International Airport =

María Montez International Airport Aeropuerto Internacional María Montez
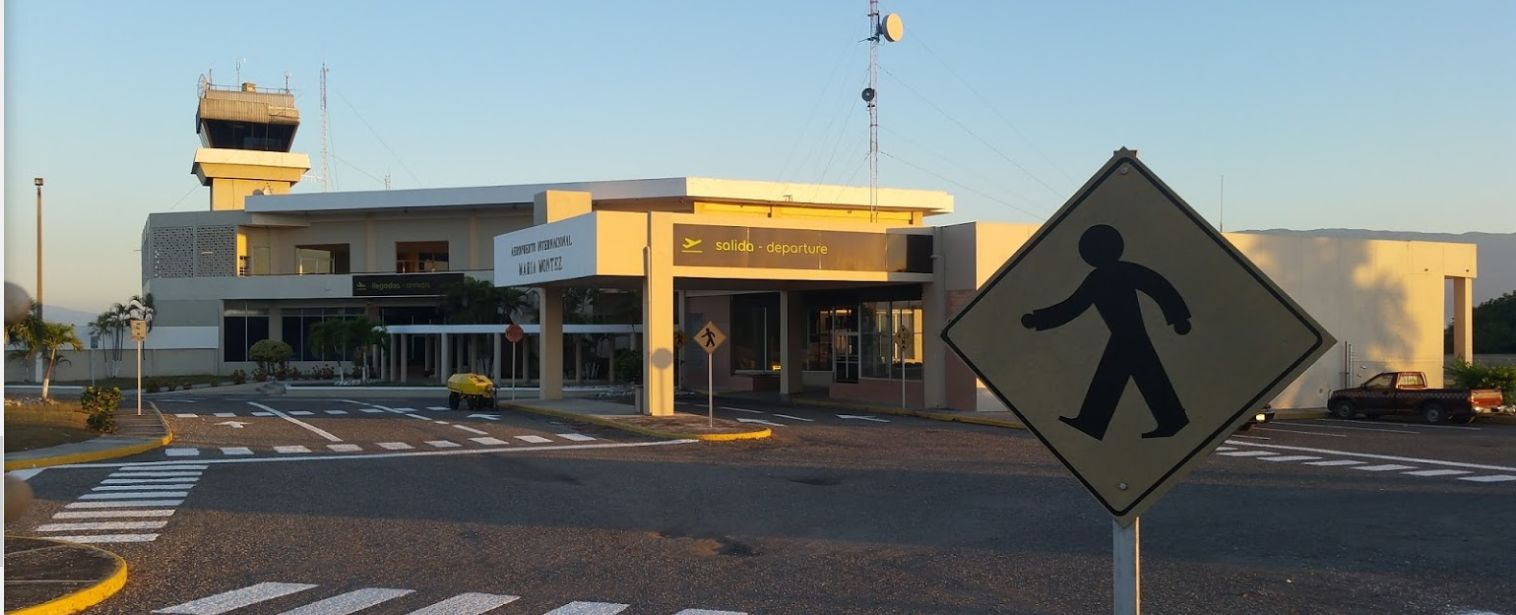
- IATA: BRX; ICAO: MDBH

Summary
- Airport type: Public
- Operator: Aerodom
- Serves: Barahona, Dominican Republic
- Elevation AMSL: 10 ft (3.0 m)
- Coordinates: 18°15′10″N 71°07′20″W

Map
- Location of airport in the Dominican Republic

Runways
Direction	Length		Surface
Direction	m	ft	Surface
12/30	3,000	9,843	Asphalt
- Source: GCM Google Maps SkyVector

María Montez International Airport (Spanish: Aeropuerto Internacional María Montez) (IATA: BRX, ICAO: MDBH) is an international airport 3 kilometres (1.9 mi) north of the Caribbean port city of Barahona, in the Barahona Province of the Dominican Republic. It is named after the late film star Maria Montez, who was born in the province of Barahona. The Barahona VOR/DME (Ident: BHO) and Barahona non-directional beacon (Ident: BHN) are located on the field.

== History ==
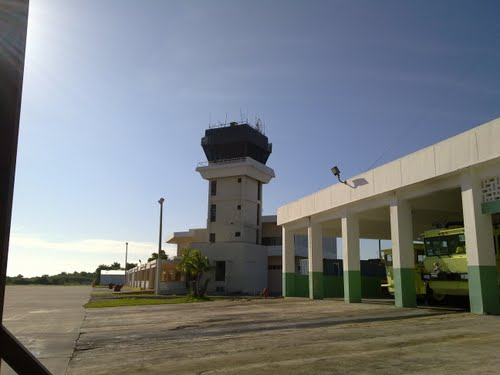
Barahona Airport Firestation

Maria Montez Airport was officially inaugurated on Saturday, 27 April 1996, in a ceremony presided over by President Joaquín Balaguer. It was built at a cost of almost five hundred million pesos.

In the year 2010 as consequences of the devastating earthquake that shook Haiti on 12 January, about 70 members of the 61 The fifth contingency Response Wing of the United States Army was deployed in the Dominican Republic with the support of Operation Unified Response. Due to the influx of overwhelming air traffic at the Port-au-Prince International Airport, Haiti, additional locations were identified at the San Isidro Air Base and Maria Montez International Airport, as delivery staging areas for the provision of humanitarian aid. In 2011, with an investment of $30 million peso RD, the runway was restored and takeoff of that air station, which has a dimension of 3,000 meters, a platform for aircraft parking 40,000 square meters, and a taxiway of 300 meters that, where they facilitate the operations of large aircraft.

In the month of July 2012, the operations of the International Company organization Terpel were initiated as an aviation fuel supplier for the airport. In 2016, Aerodom is the operator of this terminal who performs efficiently all the tasks of maintenance of this airport with around 22 employees. The IDAC who manages the operations in the airspace, with approximately 40 employees, 10 CTA and 3 of CNS who are in charge of radio communications, where Mr. Jesús Padilla stood out for his help and contributions to that department, 4 FIS and 3 safety Flight and more 15 administrative.

In 2017, the biggest investment in the private sector in the area was for the hotel and real estate project Perla del Sur, in La Cienaga, which is intended to inaugurate im 2019 with a first stage of 162 has Bitaciones. Although the project contemplates 1.200 rooms that will be finished in eight years, 5 that will allow the entrance more number of tourists via this terminal, which is and will be used for this project for expansive purposes.

In August 2018, The Ministry of Public Works and communications (MOPC) made an asphalt road access to the airport from the city as well as its parking aerial to improve the conditions of this air finish. These improvements are framed to make the airport's appearance and conditions better and for users who occasionally make use of that air terminal, can show the intentions that from the state are sought to put the terminal in operation Aerial. 6 Asphalt works North Park of AIMM Barahona. The asphalt that carries out public works, in first phase contemplates the road that gives access and the whole area of parking, which is already in phase of completion, of Maria Montez and then, according to source to this medium, will continue with the runway of that term Air Inar, which will be conditioned and extended.

== Operations ==
It has the capacity to receive Boeing 747 and other wide-bodied aircraft. It has a large parking lot for more than a hundred vehicles. Until November 1998 in this one labored about 100 employees. Later, from 1999 to 2017, the number of employees is lower, this is attributed to the reduction of the operations that this terminal has at the moment. The airport is on the coast, and approach from and departure toward the east each involve altitude changes over water. The terminal has immigration services, customs, plant and animal health, drug control. Security is commissioned by the specialized Civil Aviation Security Corps (CESAC), which controls the safety of the terminal.

== Airlines and destinations ==
As of 2024, there are no regular scheduled services operated at María Montez International Airport.

== See also ==
- Transport in Dominican Republic
- List of airports in Dominican Republic
