= El Valle Field =

Airport in the Dominican Republic

Coordinates: 18°58′35″N 69°22′45″W

El Valle Airport
- IATA: none; ICAO: MDEV

Summary
- Airport type: Public
- Location: El Valle, Dominican Republic
- Elevation AMSL: 29 ft (8.8 m)
- Interactive map of El Valle Airport

Runways
Direction	Length		Surface
Direction	ft	m	Surface
	155	47	Unpaved

El Valle Airport is located in El Valle, a town in the Hato Mayor province of the Dominican Republic. It is an alternative for Sabana de la Mar Airport, and serves as a Domestic airport without regular scheduled services.
