= Port of Barahona =

Barahona Port or Port of Barahona is located in Barahona, Dominican Republic.

== Overview ==
Port of Barahona was rebuilt in the 1950s by the United States. The Harbor has three terminals, which are called Terminal Consorcio Azucarero Central and Terminal EGE HAINA in one side. Muelle de Barahona (Barahona Harbor) and muelle del Central Azucarero (Sugar Mill Central Harbor).

This port is not very active; in 2008 it received only 50 boats with different kind of activities.

The port handles individual cargo operations, exporting minerals and oils.

== Port information ==
- Location: 18°12′51″N 71°5′17″W // MGRS 19Q BA 789 144
- Local time: UTC−4
- Weather/climate/prevailing winds: From May 15 until September 15
- Climate: mostly sunny, tropical. Hurricane season runs from June to November
- Prevailing winds: direction ENE–ESE
- Average temperature range: 28–30 °C

== See also ==
- List of ports and harbours of the Atlantic Ocean
