= Monte Plata Batley Juan Sanchez Field =

Coordinates: 18.8100°N 69.7900°W

Batley Juan Sanchez Airport
- IATA: none; ICAO: MDJS

Summary
- Airport type: Aerodrome
- Location: Monte Plata
- Elevation AMSL: 1,424 ft / 434 m
- Interactive map of Batley Juan Sanchez Airport

Runways
Direction	Length		Surface
Direction	ft	m	Surface
	1,150	255	Asphalt

Monte Plata Batley Juan Sanchez Airport is located in Monte Plata, Dominican Republic. This Airport receive some charter flights from other cities in the country.

== Airlines and destinations ==
- Servicios Aéreos Profesionales (Several Domestics Destinations) [charter]

== See also ==
- Monte Plata

== Sources ==
- Airports DR
