= Santiago Municipal Airport =

Santiago Municipal Airport Aeropuerto Municipal de Santiago
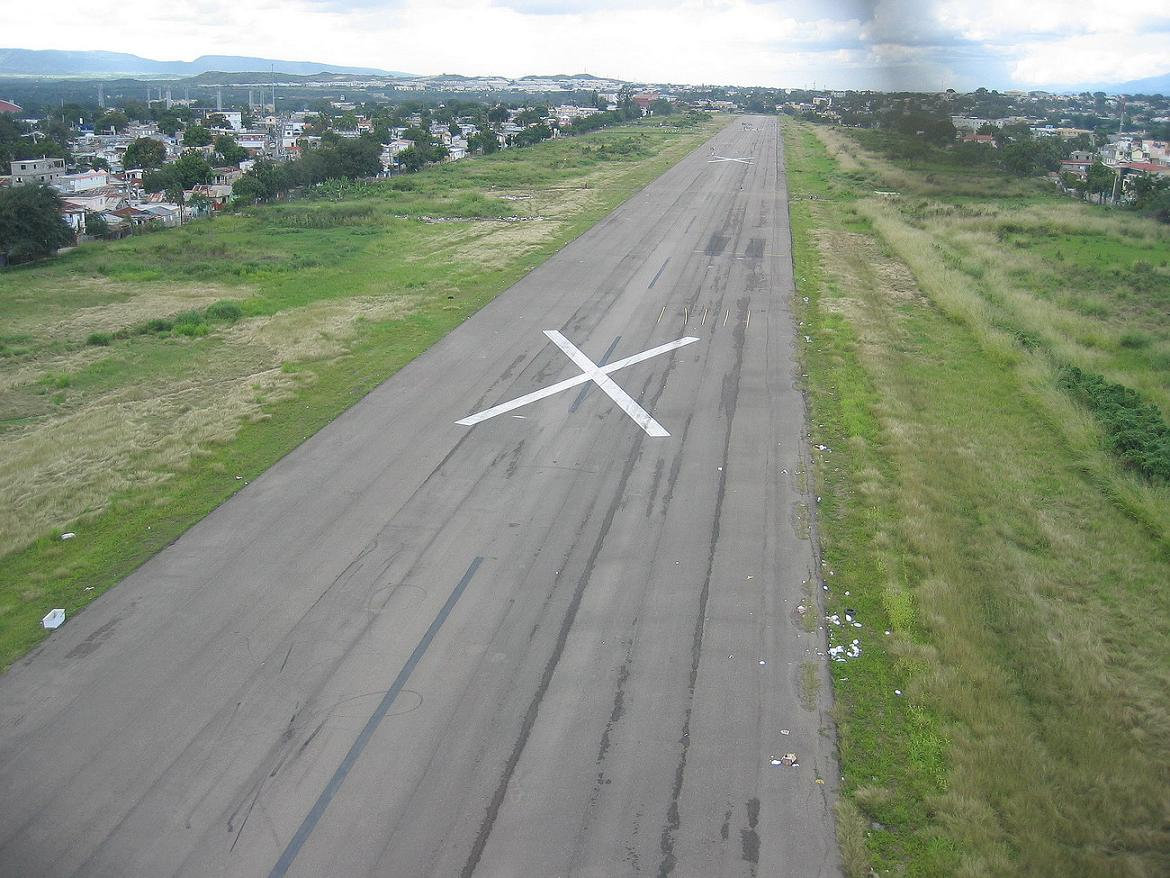
- IATA: STI; ICAO: MDST

Summary
- Airport type: Public / military (closed)
- Owner: City of Santiago
- Operator: Government of Santiago
- Serves: Santiago de los Caballeros
- Location: Santiago City Center, Dominican Republic
- Elevation AMSL: 565 ft (172 m)
- Coordinates: 19°28′11″N 070°42′00″W
- Interactive map of Santiago Municipal Airport

Runways
Direction	Length		Surface
Direction	ft	m	Surface
12/30	5,000	1,524	Asphalt/concrete

Santiago Municipal Airport was an airport, for both passenger and military use, located in the center of Santiago de los Caballeros, Dominican Republic. This airport served this city with daily flights to San Juan in Puerto Rico, Port-au-Prince in Haiti, Santiago de Cuba, Miami and others. It was used as a secondary hub by the Dominican Air Force (FAD).
