= Junta de Aviación Civil =

Junta de Aviación Civil de la República Dominicana (JAC) is the civil aviation authority of the Dominican Republic. Its headquarters is in Renacimiento, Santo Domingo. As of August 2026, Julio Peña Guzmán the president of the JAC.

On December 28, 2006 Law 491/06 was established; the elements of Law 491/06 currently govern civil aviation in the Dominican Republic.
