= San Juan de la Maguana Airport =

- IATA: SJM; ICAO: MDSJ

Summary
- Airport type: Aerodrome
- Location: San Juan de la Maguana
- Elevation AMSL: 1,424 ft / 434 m
- Coordinates: 18.83333°N 71.23333°W
- Interactive map of San Juan de la Maguana Airport

Runways
Direction	Length		Surface
Direction	m	ft	Surface
	655	2,149	Asphalt
- Source: OurAirports

San Juan de la Maguana Airport is an airport that serves San Juan de la Maguana, in the southwest of the Dominican Republic. It is mostly for charter service, emergency landing or private flights into the country.
