= Enriquillo, Barahona =

Enriquillo
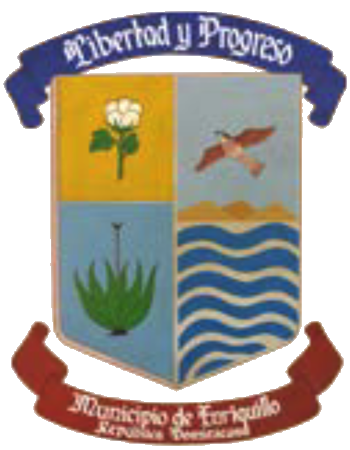
- Coat of arms

- Coordinates: 17°54′N 71°14′W
- Country: Dominican Republic
- Province: Barahona

Area
  - Total: 354.1 km^{2} (136.7 sq mi)

Population
  - Total: 10,254
  - Density: 28.96/km^{2} (75.00/sq mi)

Enriquillo (also Enriquilla and Petit Trou) is a small town in the Province of Barahona, on the Caribbean coast of the Dominican Republic.

== Climate ==
Climate data for Enriquillo, Barahona (1961–1990)
Month	Jan	Feb	Mar	Apr	May	Jun	Jul	Aug	Sep	Oct	Nov	Dec	Year
Record high °C (°F)	33.2 (91.8)	33.8 (92.8)	34.5 (94.1)	34.0 (93.2)	34.0 (93.2)	34.0 (93.2)	34.3 (93.7)	36.2 (97.2)	35.3 (95.5)	35.8 (96.4)	35.8 (96.4)	34.5 (94.1)	36.2 (97.2)
Mean daily maximum °C (°F)	30.9 (87.6)	30.9 (87.6)	31.2 (88.2)	31.4 (88.5)	31.4 (88.5)	31.6 (88.9)	31.9 (89.4)	32.1 (89.8)	32.1 (89.8)	32.0 (89.6)	31.8 (89.2)	31.2 (88.2)	31.5 (88.7)
Mean daily minimum °C (°F)	21.1 (70.0)	21.5 (70.7)	21.8 (71.2)	21.7 (71.1)	21.8 (71.2)	22.2 (72.0)	22.6 (72.7)	23.0 (73.4)	22.8 (73.0)	22.3 (72.1)	21.5 (70.7)	22.0 (71.6)	22.0 (71.6)
Record low °C (°F)	9.0 (48.2)	12.0 (53.6)	13.8 (56.8)	12.0 (53.6)	12.0 (53.6)	12.8 (55.0)	12.0 (53.6)	12.0 (53.6)	11.3 (52.3)	12.0 (53.6)	10.0 (50.0)	9.4 (48.9)	9.0 (48.2)
Average rainfall mm (inches)	52.9 (2.08)	49.7 (1.96)	60.0 (2.36)	79.9 (3.15)	169.9 (6.69)	191.7 (7.55)	72.0 (2.83)	140.8 (5.54)	230.5 (9.07)	213.7 (8.41)	108.9 (4.29)	43.5 (1.71)	1,413.5 (55.65)
Average rainy days (≥ 1.0 mm)	5.9	5.7	6.3	7.8	12.4	12.4	6.5	9.1	12.8	13.5	7.4	4.2	104.0
Source: NOAA
