= Barahona, Dominican Republic =

City in the Dominican Republic

Barahona
- Santa Cruz de Barahona
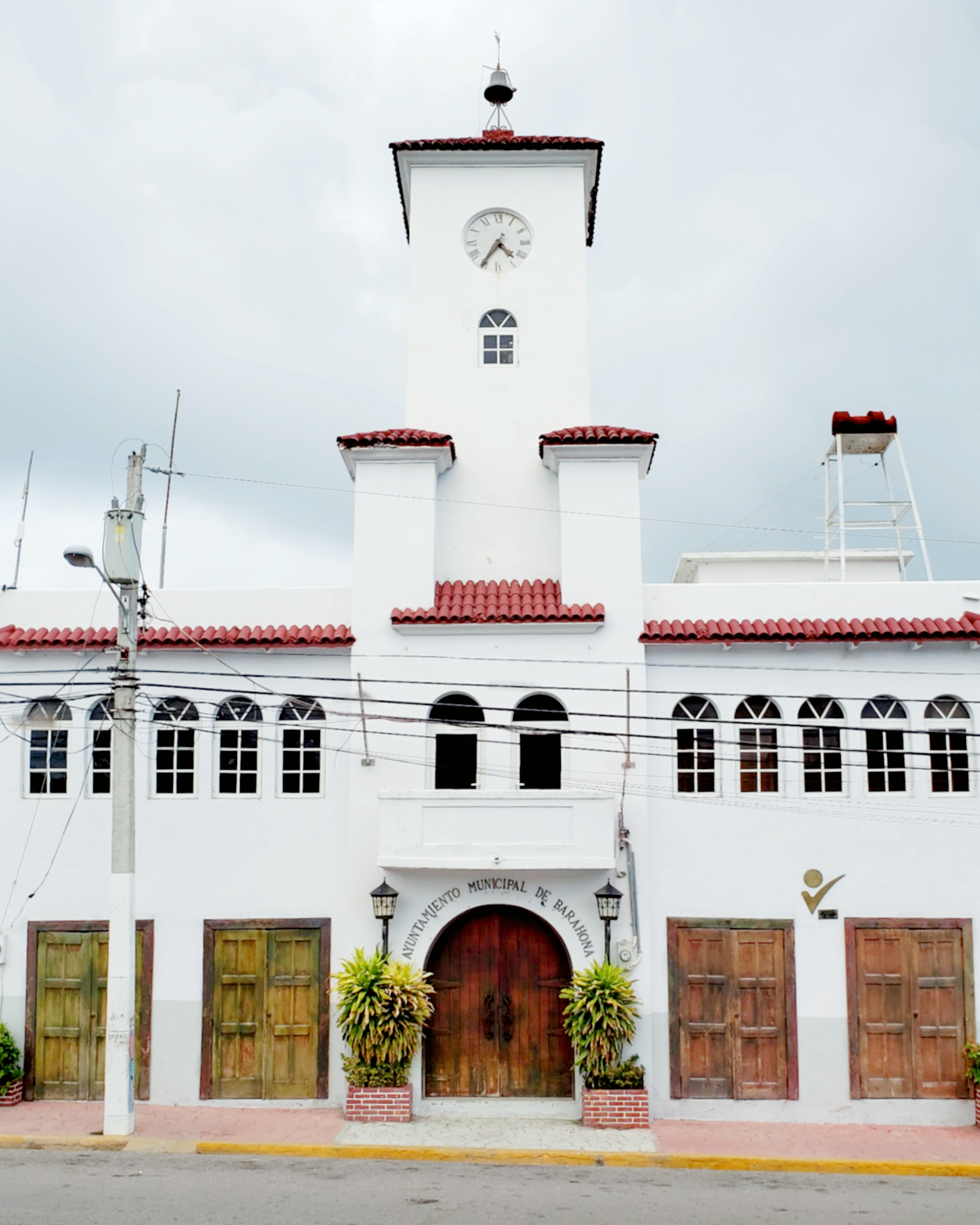
- Historic municipal building of Barahona

- Location within the Dominican Republic
- Coordinates: 18°12′N 71°06′W
- Country: Dominican Republic
- Province: Barahona
- Established: 1802
- Municipality since: 1858
- Founder: Toussaint L'ouverture

Area
  - Total: 163.02 km^{2} (62.94 sq mi)
- Elevation: 10 m (33 ft)

Population (2012)
  - Total: 138,159
  - Density: 847.50/km^{2} (2,195.0/sq mi)
  - Demonym: Barahonero(a)
- Municipal Districts: 3
- Climate: Aw

Barahona, also known as Santa Cruz de Barahona, is the main city of the Barahona Province, in the southwest of the Dominican Republic. It has one of the most active ports in the region, as well as many ecotourism attractions. The city is a centre of sugar and plantain production. Barahona is also known for being the only place where the rare Larimar stone can be found.

== History ==
Before its discovery by Europeans, the area belonged to the Native Taino chiefdom of Jaragua, ruled by Bohechío. The current name of the province and city is derived from the surname of the first Spaniards who came to the area, some of these Spaniards were also from the town of Baraona in Spain and named it in honor of their town of origin. The Spaniards spread throughout the territory and designated places with their names. Francisco de Barahona, Gabriel Barahona, Luis de Barahona and Juan de Barahona arrived on the first and second voyages of Christopher Columbus in the 1490s.

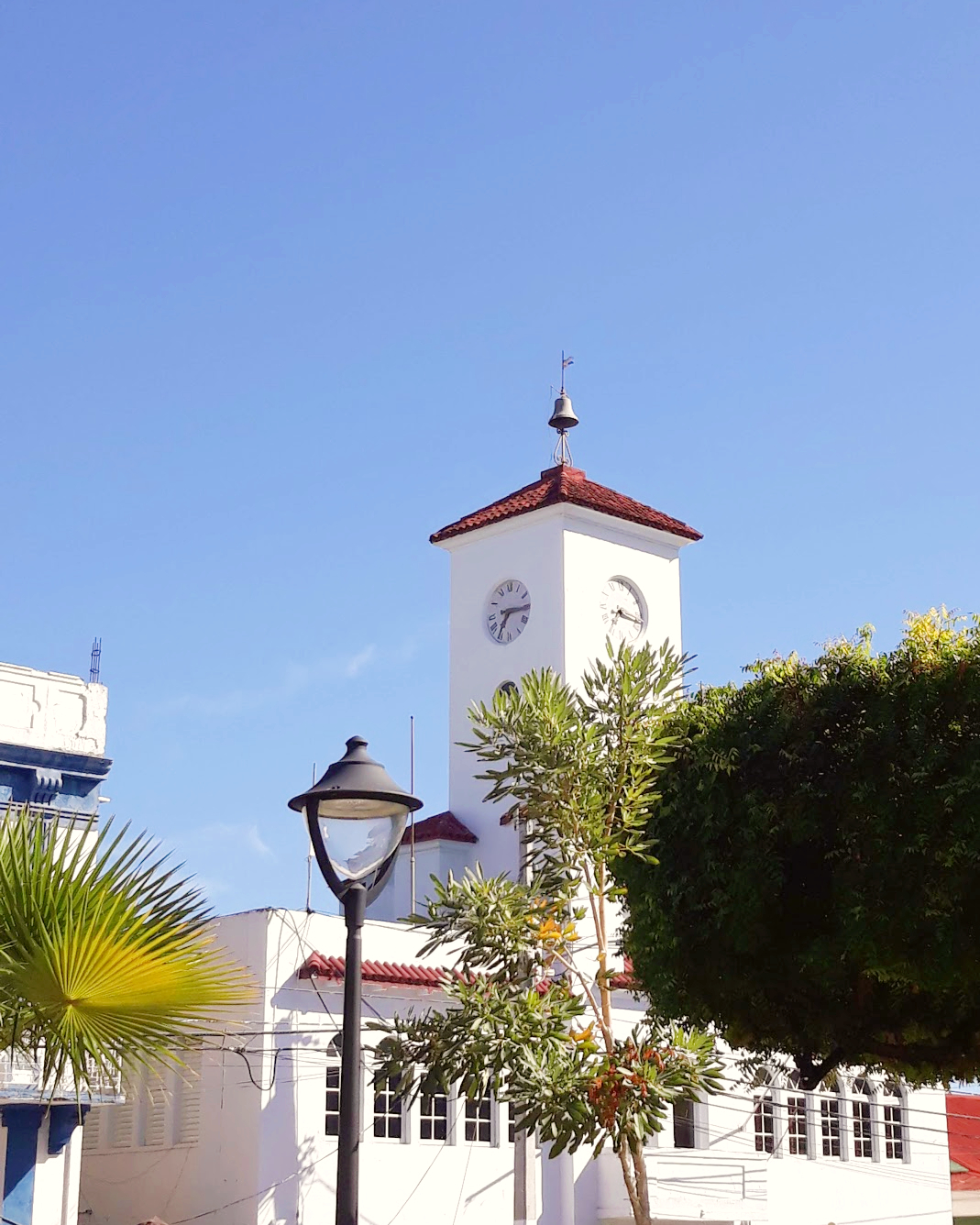
Barahona Dominican Republic municipal building.

After the nation's independence in 1844, Barahona was a military post of the Azua Province. In 1858, Barahona was elevated to the category of municipality. When the province was created in 1881, Barahona was made its head municipality. In 1907, the territorial denominations of cantons and maritime districts were abolished and replaced by the terms communes and provinces, respectively, while Barahona was promoted to this category the same year.

The revolutionary movement known as "El Salvador" was founded in Barahona by Cuban radicals with the purpose of mobilizing financial resources to support the independence movement in Cuba from Spain. Dominican president Ulises Heureaux provided money and weapons to Cuban patriots and from the shores of Barahona, weapons were brought to Cuba.

Between 1916 and 1924, the American presence in the province influenced the planting of cane and the construction of the hacienda. In 1927, the first aviation company of the Caribbean region was started in Barahona. The service was inaugurated between the cities of Barahona, Santa Cruz, San Juan, Puerto Rico, Santo Domingo and Port-au-Prince Haiti.

== Climate ==
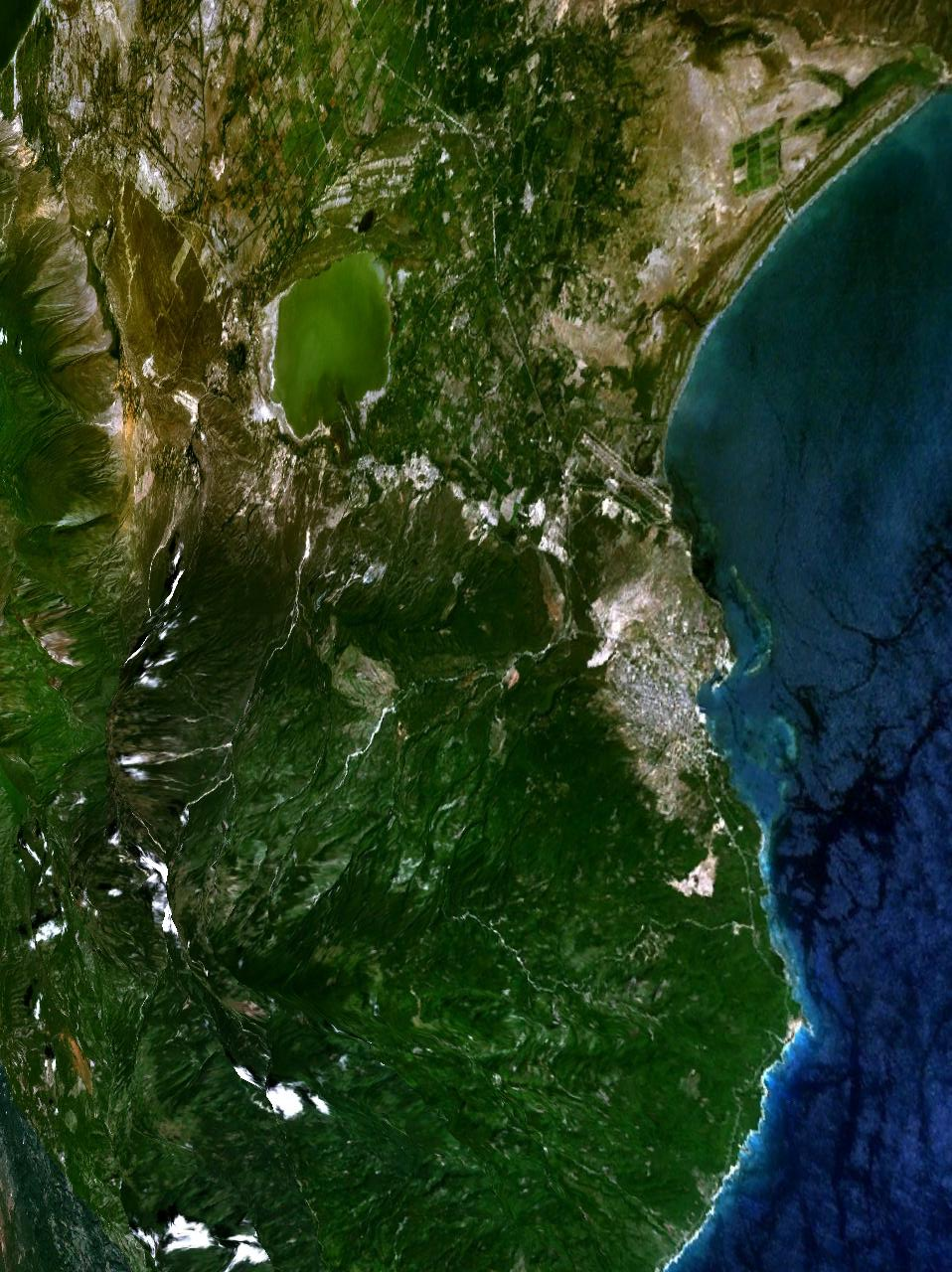
Google Earth image of Barahona.

Under the Köppen climate classification, Barahona has a tropical wet and dry climate. Temperatures tend to remain steady throughout the year, with mean temperatures ranging from a low of 24.8 °C (76.6 °F) in January to a high of 28.0 °C (82.4 °F) in July.

In terms of dry and wet seasons, Barahona has two distinctive wet seasons with a peak in precipitation from May to June followed by drought-like conditions in July and August (due to the Azores High being located in the central Atlantic, inhibiting the formation of clouds and rain) and another peak in precipitation from September to October. This precipitation pattern is due to the movement and the position of the Azores high throughout the year. The dry season mainly runs through December to April. Even in the drier months, precipitation can still occur with February receiving just under 30 mm (1.2 in). Sunshine is abundant throughout the year, averaging over 3200 hours.

Climate data for María Montez International Airport (1991–2020)
Month	Jan	Feb	Mar	Apr	May	Jun	Jul	Aug	Sep	Oct	Nov	Dec	Year
Mean daily maximum °C (°F)	30.2 (86.4)	30.3 (86.5)	30.3 (86.5)	30.7 (87.3)	31.0 (87.8)	31.6 (88.9)	32.6 (90.7)	32.8 (91.0)	32.4 (90.3)	31.7 (89.1)	31.3 (88.3)	30.7 (87.3)	31.3 (88.3)
Daily mean °C (°F)	25.3 (77.5)	25.5 (77.9)	26.0 (78.8)	26.7 (80.1)	27.3 (81.1)	28.0 (82.4)	28.5 (83.3)	28.6 (83.5)	28.1 (82.6)	27.4 (81.3)	26.7 (80.1)	25.8 (78.4)	27.0 (80.6)
Mean daily minimum °C (°F)	20.4 (68.7)	20.7 (69.3)	21.6 (70.9)	22.8 (73.0)	23.6 (74.5)	24.3 (75.7)	24.5 (76.1)	24.4 (75.9)	23.7 (74.7)	23.1 (73.6)	22.2 (72.0)	20.8 (69.4)	22.7 (72.9)
Average precipitation mm (inches)	23.3 (0.92)	20.4 (0.80)	51.2 (2.02)	97.8 (3.85)	147.4 (5.80)	75.2 (2.96)	49.2 (1.94)	119.0 (4.69)	119.5 (4.70)	161.3 (6.35)	99.6 (3.92)	36.2 (1.43)	1,000.4 (39.39)
Source: NOAA

Climate data for Barahona (1961-1990)
Month	Jan	Feb	Mar	Apr	May	Jun	Jul	Aug	Sep	Oct	Nov	Dec	Year
Record high °C (°F)	33.2 (91.8)	34.0 (93.2)	33.8 (92.8)	34.5 (94.1)	34.7 (94.5)	34.2 (93.6)	35.6 (96.1)	37.5 (99.5)	35.8 (96.4)	34.5 (94.1)	34.0 (93.2)	34.3 (93.7)	37.5 (99.5)
Mean daily maximum °C (°F)	29.3 (84.7)	29.2 (84.6)	29.5 (85.1)	30.0 (86.0)	30.3 (86.5)	30.7 (87.3)	31.7 (89.1)	31.9 (89.4)	31.5 (88.7)	30.7 (87.3)	30.6 (87.1)	29.8 (85.6)	30.4 (86.7)
Daily mean °C (°F)	24.8 (76.6)	25.0 (77.0)	25.6 (78.1)	26.3 (79.3)	26.8 (80.2)	27.4 (81.3)	28.0 (82.4)	27.9 (82.2)	27.4 (81.3)	26.6 (79.9)	26.2 (79.2)	25.3 (77.5)	26.4 (79.5)
Mean daily minimum °C (°F)	20.3 (68.5)	20.7 (69.3)	21.6 (70.9)	22.6 (72.7)	23.3 (73.9)	24.1 (75.4)	24.3 (75.7)	24.0 (75.2)	23.3 (73.9)	22.6 (72.7)	21.8 (71.2)	20.7 (69.3)	22.4 (72.3)
Record low °C (°F)	15.0 (59.0)	15.0 (59.0)	17.0 (62.6)	18.0 (64.4)	19.2 (66.6)	20.0 (68.0)	19.5 (67.1)	20.0 (68.0)	20.0 (68.0)	19.6 (67.3)	16.6 (61.9)	15.5 (59.9)	15.0 (59.0)
Average rainfall mm (inches)	30.4 (1.20)	29.3 (1.15)	45.1 (1.78)	64.1 (2.52)	168.5 (6.63)	129.5 (5.10)	38.1 (1.50)	65.1 (2.56)	143.7 (5.66)	184.9 (7.28)	75.6 (2.98)	44.4 (1.75)	1,018.7 (40.11)
Average rainy days (≥ 0.1 mm)	3.7	3.2	3.9	6.1	10.6	8.2	3.8	5.1	8.8	10.6	4.8	2.4	71.2
Average relative humidity (%)	73.0	72.6	71.5	71.9	75.6	75.8	72.0	72.9	76.3	78.4	75.1	72.8	74.0
Mean monthly sunshine hours	259.6	248.8	286.7	271.5	261.0	264.7	289.3	286.5	243.2	259.0	267.7	268.6	3,206.6
Source 1: World Meteorological Organization
Source 2: NOAA

== Economy ==
Barahona has a diversified economy that combines agriculture, mining and tourism, with an industrial port and a free zone dedicated to textile production. Among the most important companies in the area are: CEMEX Dominicana that exploits gypsum from a mine, Rica with dairy production, the "Consorcio Azucarero Central" with sugar production, EGE Haina with electricity production, Wilbes Dominicana with areas of free trade and "Block Khoury" which produces and exports construction materials.

Agriculture and the production of cane, bananas, coffee, fruits, sorghum, yams, yautia and others. The main product in the municipality is a very good coffee ("Barahona Type Coffee"), grown in the mountains of Eastern Bahoruco. In livestock, the fattening of cattle and goats for meat, sale of leather and the growing milk production predominate, in mining the extraction of larimar, marble, plaster, alabaster, kaolin (for the production of bottles), mineral salt and construction materials, are among the main activities of Barahona.

=== Downtown Barahona ===
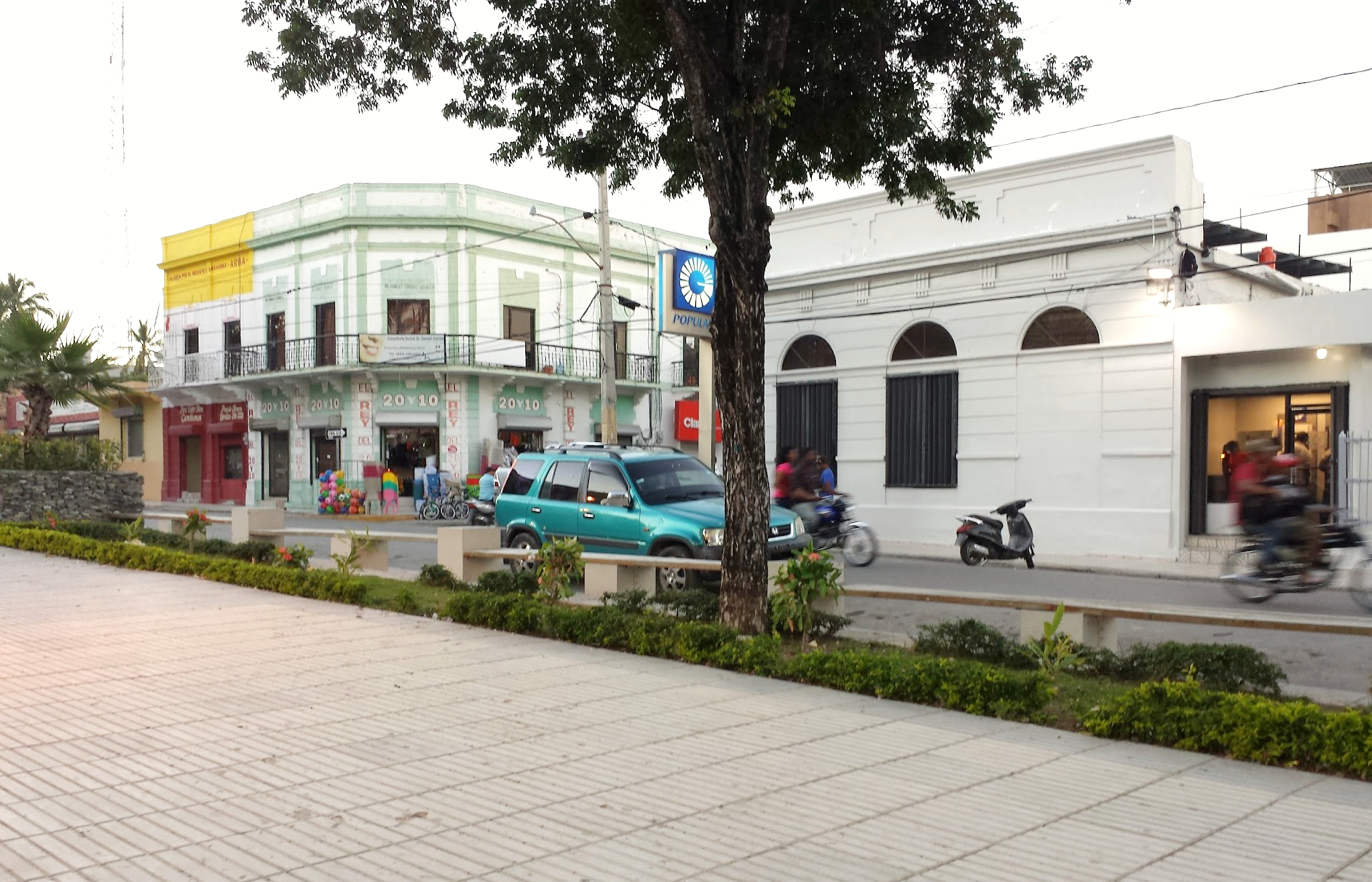

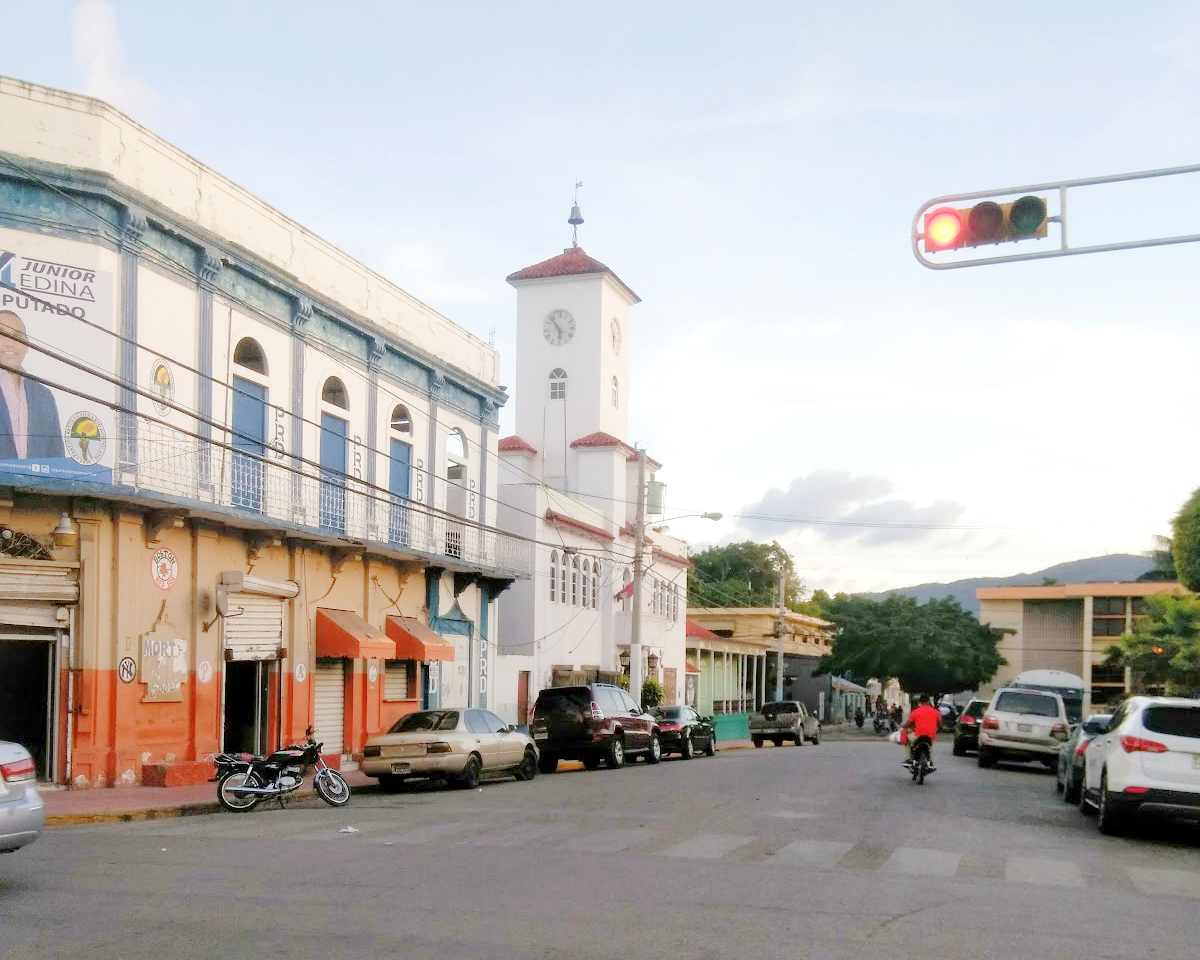

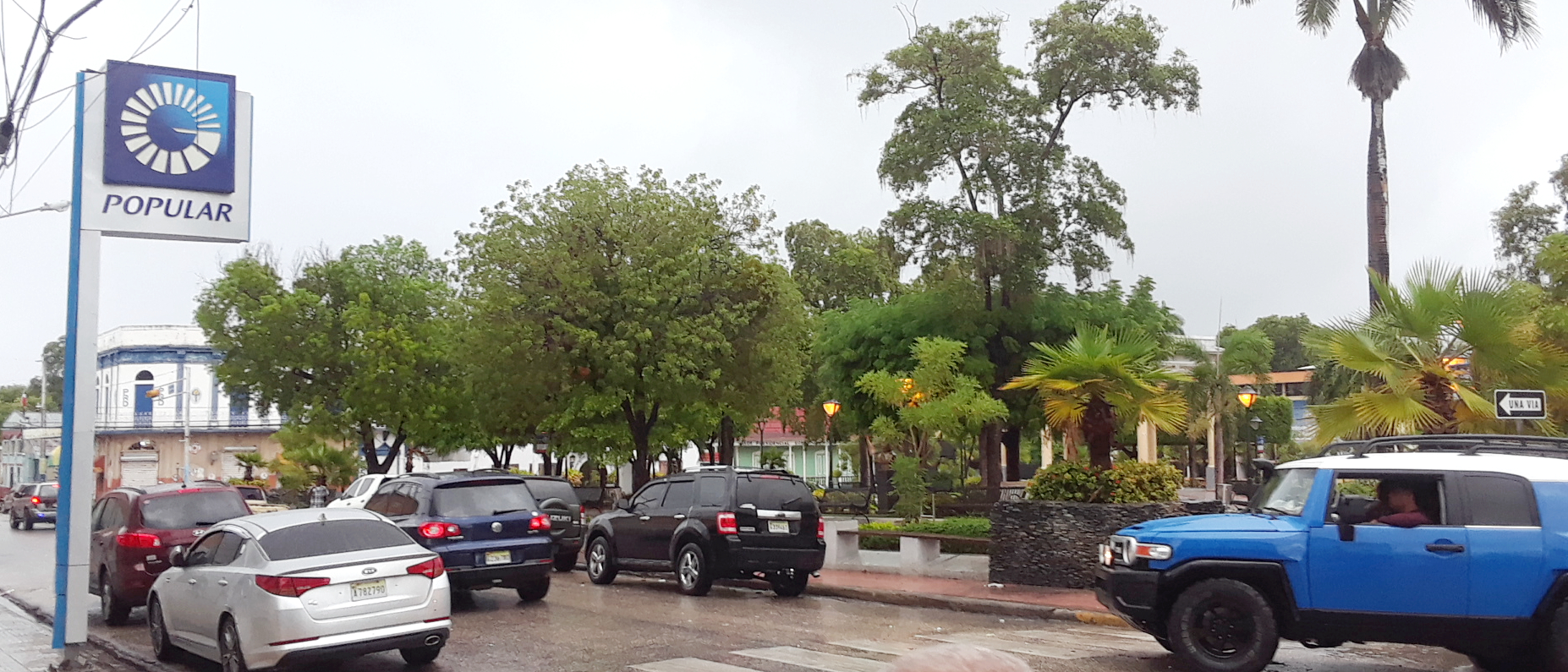

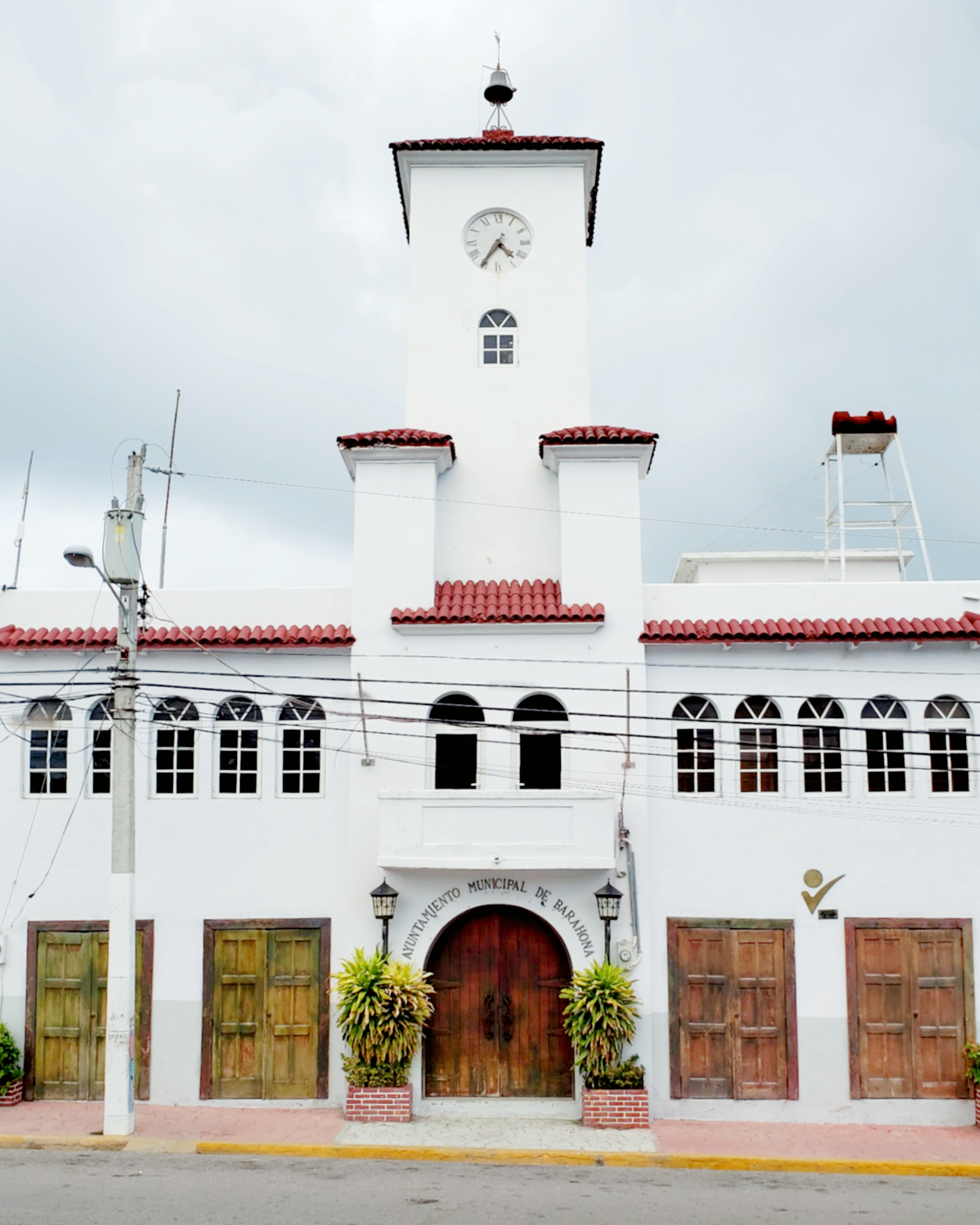

== Transport ==
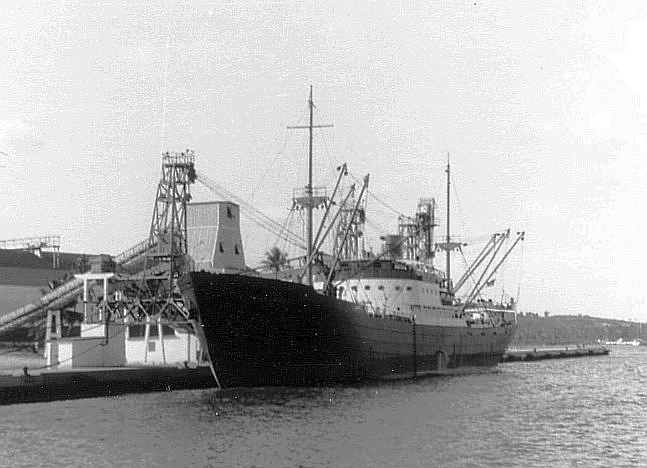
The German cargo Ship MS Vogelsberg loading of sugar - Santa Cruz de Barahona, 1959

The city of Barahona has a sea port, which receives many ferries from different points in the Caribbean, and an airport, which has been reactivated with many flights a week to Punta Cana via Santo Domingo. Authorities provided the airport with a fuel station park, allowing facilities to the airliners that could operate in the airport in the future. The airport is the well known María Montez International Airport located about 10 minutes from the city center. The port is located about 5 minutes away from the city center.

== Notable natives and residents ==
- Julio Lugo, shortstop for the Boston Red Sox
- Ruddy Lugo, relief pitcher for the Oakland Athletics
- Maria Montez, actress
- David Thomatis, Italo-Australian agriculturalist
- Ludo Vika, actress/comedian
- Edinson Vólquez, pitcher for the Kansas City Royals
- Luis Terrero, MLB Baseball Outfielder for the Arizona Diamondbacks, Baltimore Orioles, Chicago White Sox
- Casandra Damirón, singer, dancer and folklorist
