= Transport in the Dominican Republic =

Transport in the Dominican Republic utilizes a system of roads, airports, ports, harbours, and an urban railway.

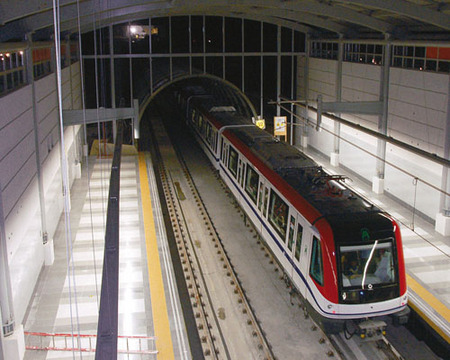
Dominican Republic transportation, Santo Domingo city metro pictured in 2008

== Roadways ==
Five main highways (DR-1, DR-2, DR-3, DR-4, DR-5) connect the Dominican Republic's biggest cities and tourist centers; they are in good condition. There are nearly 19,705 km (12,244 mi) of highways and roads, 9,872 being paved and 9,833 km (6,110 mi) (2002 est.) unpaved. Like any underdeveloped nation, the Dominican Republic suffers from a lack of good paved roads to connect smaller towns and less populated areas, though work on paving them proceeds. Major town roads are kept in good condition. Motorists drive on the right-hand side of the road.

== Public transportation ==
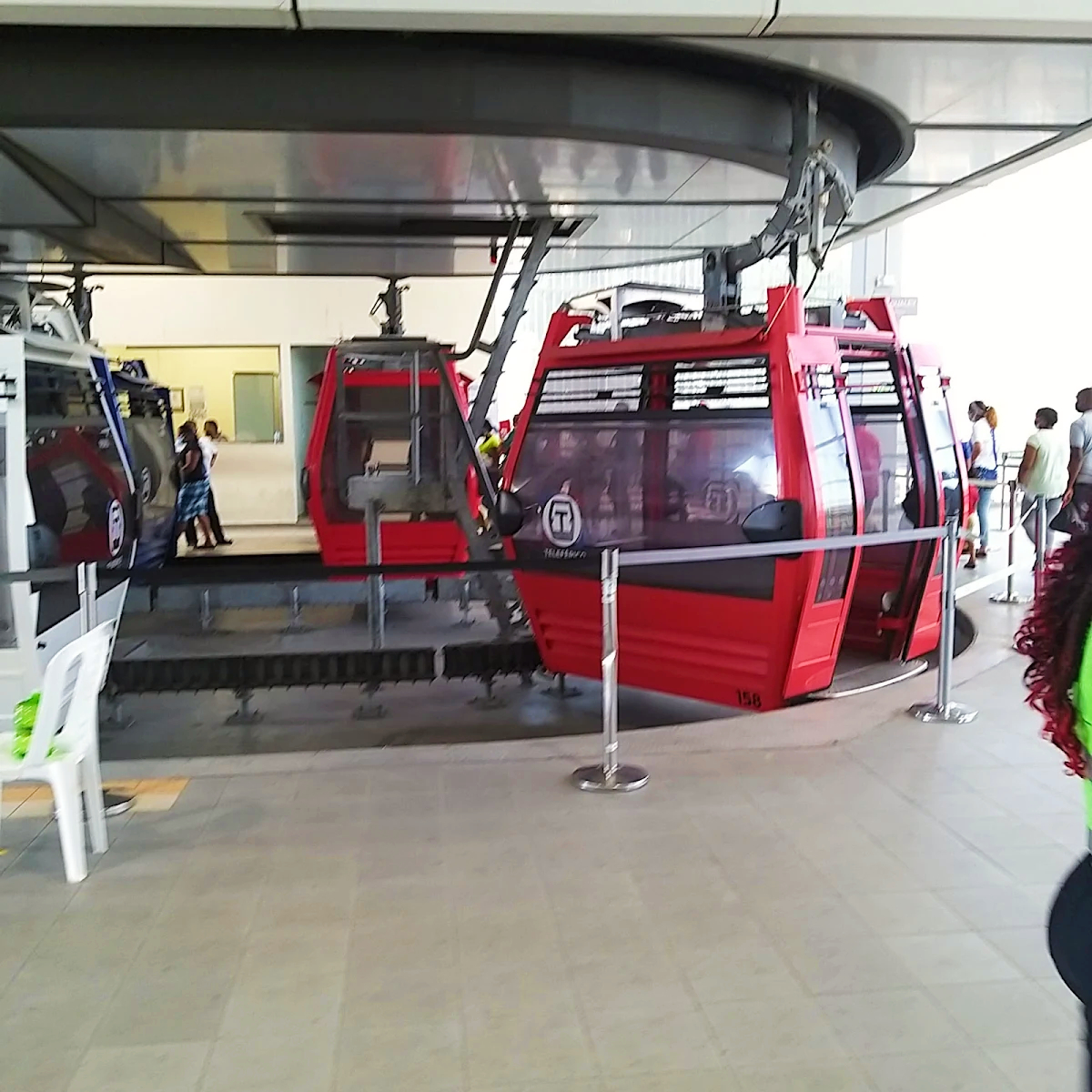
Teleférico de Santo Domingo

=== Mass transit ===
The Santo Domingo Metro is the first mass transit system in the country, and the second among Caribbean & Central American nations. It is the most extensive metro system in the region by length and total number of stations. On February 27, 2008, the incumbent president Leonel Fernández test-rode the system for the first time, and thereafter free service was offered several times. Commercial service began on January 30, 2009. Several additional lines are currently planned.

Santiago Light Rail is a planned light rail system, still at the development stage, in the Dominican Republic's second-largest city Santiago de los Caballeros. Construction was slated to begin in mid-2008 but is currently on hold, due to lack of approval and of central government funds.

=== Buses ===
Public transport bus in Las Terrenas

The Dominican Republic has a bus system that is rather reliable, and most of these public transportation vehicles are fairly comfortable. The fare is generally inexpensive, and there are bus terminals and stops in most of the island's major cities.

=== Public Cars (Carros Públicos) ===
The Public Cars (Carros Públicos–Conchos) are privately owned passenger cars that transit a specific route daily Passengers may request a stop anywhere along the route. Carros Públicos carry a significant portion of commuters in Santo Domingo and other major cities. The system is not very reliable and lacks oversight and regulation which leads to congestion and other issues. They may also be somewhat uncomfortable, since drivers try to fit as many people as possible inside the vehicles. Carros Públicos are often standard sedans, but can be packed with as many as six passengers.

== Railways ==
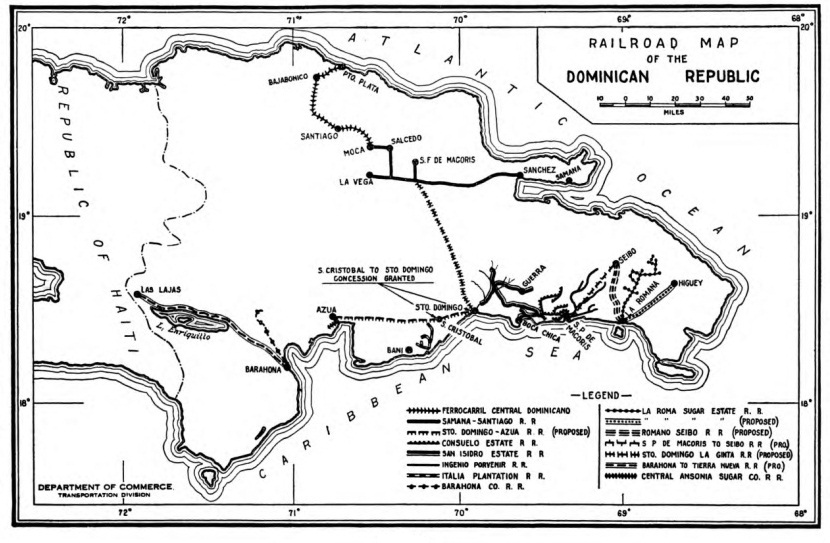
Rail map as of 1925

Rail operations are provided by one state-owned operator and several private operators (mainly for sugar mills). There are no rail connections with neighboring Haiti.

- Central Romana Railroad was established in 1911 in the sugarcane fields. The total length of the line is 757 km (470 mi), 375 km (233 mi) being the 1,435 mm (4 ft 8 1/2 in) standard gauge.
- The Dominican Republic Government Railway (United Dominican Railways or Ferrocarriles Unidos Dominicanos) was a 139 km (86 mi) 1,067 mm (3 ft 6 in) narrow gauge railway.
- There are 240 km (149 mi) operated by other sugarcane companies in various gauges: 557 mm (21 15/16 in), 762 mm (2 ft 6 in), 1,067 mm (3 ft 6 in) gauges (1995).

== Ports and harbors ==
Major ports and harbours in the Dominican Republic:

=== Ports ===
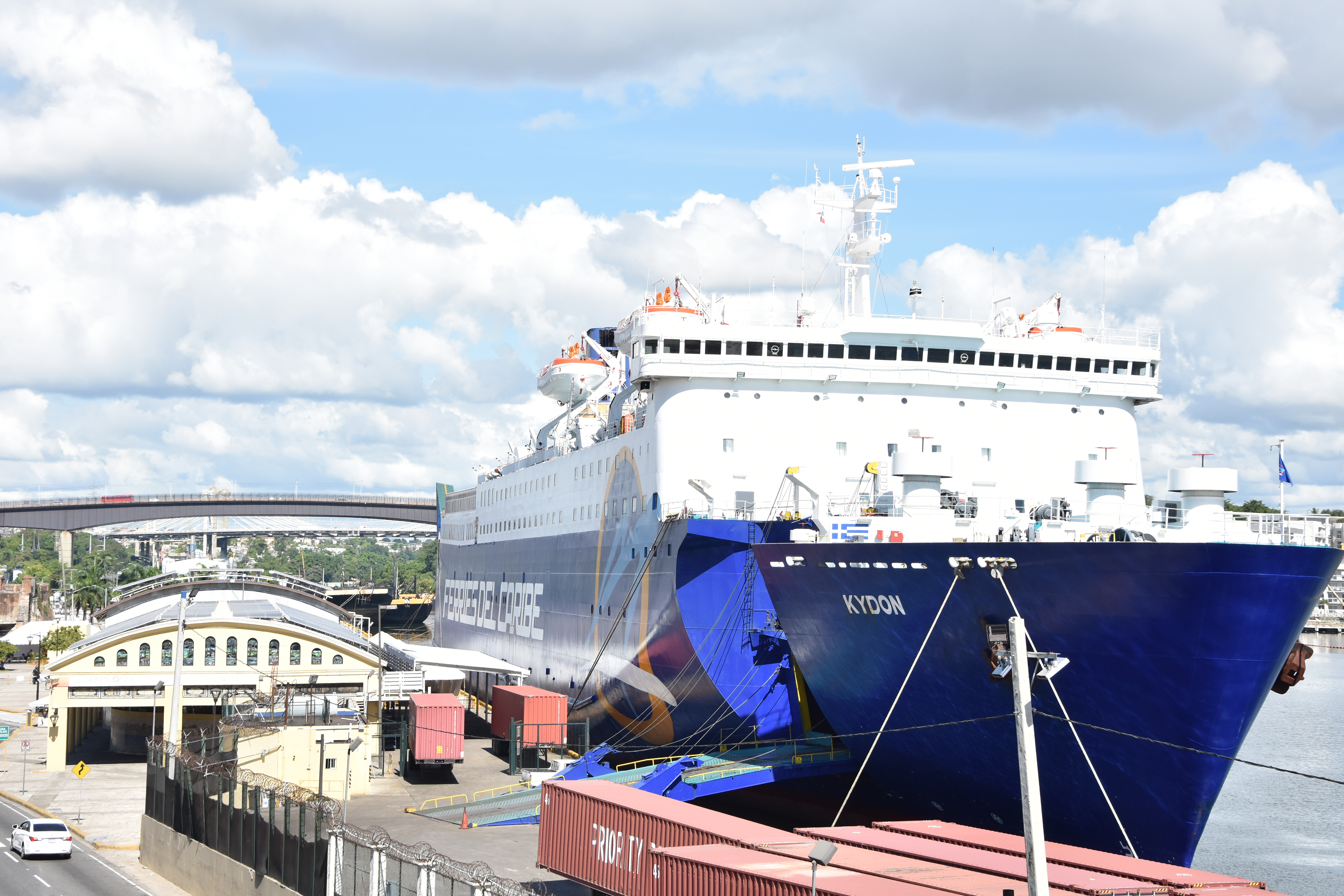
Don diego terminal

- The Port of Santo Domingo, with its location in the Caribbean, is well suited for flexible itinerary planning and has excellent support, road, and airport infrastructure within the Santo Domingo region, which facilitate access and transfers. The port is suitable for both turnaround and transit calls.
- Haina Occidental Port, located just 20 km west of Santo Domingo, is one of the most important ports in the Dominican Republic. About 70% of all cargo, excluding Caucedo and free zone exports/imports, is moved through this port.
- DP World's terminal Multimodal Caucedo Port maritime terminal and logistic center operates under the Free Zone Regime. Actually 85% of Free Zone exports to the United States is shipped from Caucedo terminal. Multimodal Caucedo port is also able to act as a trans-shipment hub to the Caribbean and Latin America for Asia specifically Japan as a door to the American market.
- Port of Puerto Plata is the main commercial port on the north coast of the Dominican Republic.
- Port of Boca Chica is located about 20 miles east of the capital city and five miles from the International airport Las Americas. Currently the port is almost exclusively used for containers and some lumber, newsprint and homogeneous cargoes.
- Port of San Pedro de Macoris is located on the Higuamo river. This port is mainly used to discharge bulk fertilizer. Cement clinker, coal, wheat, diesel and LPG. It is also used to export sugar and molasses produced by several sugar cane mills in the region.
- Central Romana Port, located in La Romana, belong to Central Romana Corporation which is a private company established in 1912 and has the largest sugar mill in the country.

The following six local ports are a single pier with berth facility:

- Cayo Levantado Port or (Arroyo Barruk/Puerto Duarte) is located in the Samaná Bay.
- Manzanillo Port is located very close to the Haitian border.
- Port of Cabo Rojo is located in Cabo Rojo, southeast to the border.
- Port of Barahona is located in Barahona, in the bay of Neyba.
- Port of Azua in Azua, also called Puerto Viejo is located at Ocoa Bay.
- Palenque Port is located southwest of Santo Domingo.

A local ferry service runs daily between the Samaná and Sabana del Mar ports.

=== Merchant marine ===
- Total:
  - 1 ship (1,000 GT or over) totaling 1,587 GT/1,165 tonnes deadweight (DWT)
- Ships by type:
  - cargo 1 (1999 est.)

=== Entering the ports ===
Boaters and sailors who wish to dock in any of the Dominican Republic's ports must follow certain entry requirements:

- Upon approaching the port, ships must display a quarantine flag, which has the letter 'Q' on it, and wait for admittance into the port.
- The passengers of the vessel must pay a fee, get a tourist card, and show proper identification including a valid passport.
- Military officials must sometimes grant the passengers clearance to come ashore.
- For entering or leaving the Dominican Republic, the Dominican e-Ticket is required. It is an electronic system designed to streamline immigration procedures and enhance border security.

== Airports ==
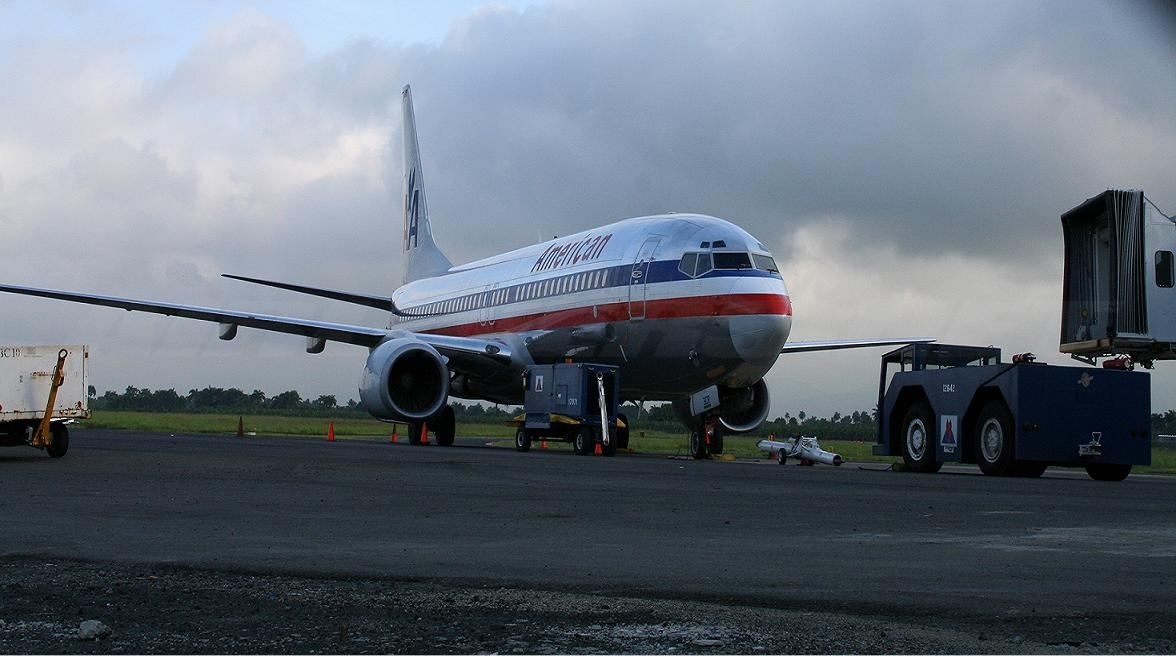
Boeing 737-800 at Cibao International Airport in Santiago de los Caballeros in 2006

In 2009, there were seven major and 31 minor airports in the Dominican Republic. The major ones were:

- Las Américas International Airport, Santo Domingo City, Santo Domingo
- Punta Cana International Airport, Punta Cana / Higüey
- Cibao International Airport, Santiago City, Santiago
- Gregorio Luperón International Airport, Puerto Plata
- La Romana International Airport, La Romana City, La Romana
- Samana El Catey International Airport, Sanchez, Samana
- María Montez International Airport, Barahona City, Barahona

=== Airports - with paved runways ===
- Total: 10 (1999 est.)
  - Over 3,047 m: 3
  - 2,438 to 3,047 m: 1
  - 1,524 to 2,437 m: 4
  - 914 to 1,523 m: 3
  - under 913 m: 2

=== Airports - with unpaved runways ===
- Total: 15 (1999 est.)
  - 1,524 to 2,437 m: 2
  - 914 to 1,523 m: 4
  - under 914 m: 9

=== National airlines ===
- Dominicana de Aviación was the national airline of the Dominican Republic for more than 50 years. This title was passed on to various other companies after Dominicana stopped flying.
- After operations at Dominicana de Aviación ceased, PAWA Dominicana became the flag carrier of the country in 2015. However, the airline ceased operation in January 2018.
- Arajet, founded in 2022, is currently the flag carrier of the Dominican Republic, serving flights to countries around the Americas.

==== Flights ====
There are direct flights to and from the Dominican Republic from the United States, Cuba, Canada, Mexico, Venezuela, Colombia, Argentina, Brazil, Europe and the Caribbean.

== See also ==
- Dominican Republic
- Puerto Plata Airport
