= List of airports in El Salvador =

This is a list of airports in El Salvador, sorted by location.

== List ==
| Location | District | ICAO | IATA | Airport name |
|---|---|---|---|---|
| Barrillas | San Dionisio | MSBS | | Barrillas Airport |
| Cangrejera | La Libertad | MSCS | | Las Cachas Airport |
| Casas Nuevas | Jiquilisco | MSCN | | Casas Nuevas Airport |
| Ceiba Doblada | Jiquilisco | MSCD | | Ceiba Doblada Airport |
| Condadillo | Conchagua | | | Airport of the Pacific (under construction) |
| Corral de Mulas | San Dionisio | MSCM | | Corral de Mulas Airport |
| Corral de Mulas | San Dionisio | MSSJ | | Punta San Juan Airport |
| El Algodón | Santa Rosa de Lima | | | Santa Rosa de Lima Airport |
| El Jocotillo | Acajutla | MSJC | | El Jocotillo Airport |
| El Palmer | Santa Ana | MSSA | | El Palmer Airport (closed) |
| El Papalón | San Miguel | MSSM | | El Papalón Airport |
| El Platanar | Moncagua | MSPT | | El Platanar Airport |
| El Ronco | Metapán | MSRC | | El Ronco Airport (closed) |
| El Tamarindo | Conchagua | MSET | | El Jagüey Airfield |
| El Zapote | San Francisco Menéndez | MSZT | | El Zapote Airport |
| Espiritu Santo | San Dionisio | MSES | | Espiritu Santo Airport |
| Ilopango | Ilopango | MSSS | ILS | Ilopango International Airport |
| La Aramuaca | San Miguel | MSAC | | La Aramuaca Airport |
| La Cabaña | El Paisnal | MSLC | | La Cabaña Airport |
| La Carrera | Jiquilisco | MSCR | | La Carrera Airport |
| La Chepona | San Dionisio | MSCH | | La Chepona Airport |
| Las Flores | San Luis Talpa | MSLP | SAL | San Óscar Arnulfo Romero y Galdámez International Airport |
| Los Commandos | San Francisco Gotera | MSLD | | Los Comandos Airport |
| Ojo de Agua | Usulután | | | Usulután Airport |
| Tonalá | Sonsonate | | | Tonalá Airport (under construction) |

== See also ==
- Transport in El Salvador
- List of airports by ICAO code: M#MS - El Salvador
- Wikipedia: WikiProject Aviation/Airline destination lists: North America#El Salvador
