= Punta San Juan Airport =

- IATA: none; ICAO: MSSJ

Summary
- Airport type: Public
- Serves: Corral De Mulas
- Elevation AMSL: 3 ft / 1 m
- Coordinates: 13°10′40″N 88°28′25″W

Map
- Location of the airport in El Salvador

Runways
Direction	Length		Surface
Direction	m	ft	Surface
03/21	1,300	4,265	Grass
- Source: Google Maps OurAirports

Punta San Juan Airport (ICAO: MSSJ) is an airport serving the village of Corral De Mulas in Usulután Department, El Salvador. The unmarked grass runway is 7 kilometres (4.3 mi) east of the village on Punta San Juan, the western shore of the entrance to Bahia de Jiquilisco. Corral de Mulas is also served by Corral de Mulas Airport.

The El Salvador VOR-DME (Ident: CAT) is located 37.1 nautical miles (68.7 km) west-northwest of the airstrip.

== See also ==
- Transport in El Salvador
- List of airports in El Salvador
