= Barrillas Airport =

- IATA: none; ICAO: MSBS

Summary
- Airport type: Public
- Serves: Usulután
- Elevation AMSL: 32 ft / 10 m
- Coordinates: 13°15′55″N 88°29′55″W

Map
- Location of the airport in El Salvador

Runways
Direction	Length		Surface
Direction	m	ft	Surface
08/26	1,545	5,069	Grass
- Source: Google Maps OurAirports

Barrillas Airport (ICAO: MSBS) is an airport serving Puerto Barillas, a small-craft dockage on an arm of the Bahia de Jiquilisco, 10 kilometres (6.2 mi) southwest of Usulután in Usulután Department, El Salvador.

The El Salvador VOR-DME (Ident: CAT) is located 33.8 nautical miles (62.6 km; 38.9 mi) west-northwest of the airport.

== See also ==
- Transport in El Salvador
- List of airports in El Salvador
