= La Chepona Airport =

Airport in Usulután Department, El Salvador

- IATA: none; ICAO: MSCH

Summary
- Airport type: Public
- Serves: La Chepona, El Salvador
- Elevation AMSL: 13 ft / 4 m
- Coordinates: 13°11′10″N 88°24′24″W

Map
- Location of the airport in El Salvador

Runways
Direction	Length		Surface
Direction	m	ft	Surface
10/28	970	3,182	Grass
- Source: Google Maps OurAirports

La Chepona Airport (ICAO: MSCH) is an airstrip serving the village of La Chepona in Usulután Department, El Salvador. The airstrip and village are on an estuarian island just east of the Jiquilisco Bay.

The El Salvador VOR-DME (Ident: CAT) is located 40.5 nautical miles (75.0 km) west-northwest of the airstrip.

== See also ==
- Transport in El Salvador
- List of airports in El Salvador
