= Espiritu Santo Airport =

- IATA: none; ICAO: MSES

Summary
- Airport type: Public
- Serves: Espiritu Santo
- Elevation AMSL: 1 m / 3 ft
- Coordinates: 13°13′10″N 88°33′15″W

Map
- Location of the airport in El Salvador

Runways
Direction	Length		Surface
Direction	m	ft	Surface
09/27	900	2,953	Grass
- Source: Google Maps OurAirports

Espiritu Santo Airport (ICAO: MSES) is an airstrip serving the village of Espiritu Santo in Usulután Department, El Salvador. The runway is on a point in the Bahia de Jiquilisco.

The El Salvador VOR-DME (Ident: CAT) is located 31.8 nautical miles (58.9 km) west-northwest of the airstrip.

== See also ==
- Transport in El Salvador
- List of airports in El Salvador
