= Casas Nuevas Airport =

Airstrip in Usulután Department, El Salvador

- IATA: none; ICAO: MSCN

Summary
- Airport type: Public
- Serves: Jiquilisco
- Elevation AMSL: 157 ft / 48 m
- Coordinates: 13°18′35″N 88°30′25″W

Map
- Location of the airport in El Salvador

Runways
Direction	Length		Surface
Direction	m	ft	Surface
08/26	1,125	3,691	Grass
- Source: Google Maps OurAirports

Casas Nuevas Airport (ICAO: MSCN) is an airstrip serving the city of Jiquilisco in Usulután Department, El Salvador. The unmarked grass runway is 7 kilometres (4.3 mi) east of the city.

== See also ==
- Transport in El Salvador
- List of airports in El Salvador
