= La Carrera Airport =

- IATA: none; ICAO: MSCR

Summary
- Airport type: Public
- Serves: Jiquilisco
- Elevation AMSL: 254 ft / 77 m
- Coordinates: 13°19′45″N 88°31′15″W

Map
- Location of the airport in El Salvador

Runways
Direction	Length		Surface
Direction	m	ft	Surface
01/19	930	3,051	Grass
- Source: Google Maps OurAirports

La Carrera Airport (ICAO: MSCR) is an airport serving the city of Jiquilisco in Usulután Department, El Salvador. The runway is 5 kilometres (3.1 mi) east of Jiquilisco.

== See also ==
- Transport in El Salvador
- List of airports in El Salvador
