= Ceiba Doblada Airport =

- IATA: none; ICAO: MSCD

Summary
- Airport type: Public
- Serves: Ceiba Doblada
- Elevation AMSL: 10 ft / 3 m
- Coordinates: 13°12′47″N 88°36′10″W

Map
- Location of the airport in El Salvador

Runways
Direction	Length		Surface
Direction	m	ft	Surface
10/28	790	2,592	Grass
- Source: Google Maps FallingRain

Ceiba Doblada Airport (ICAO: MSCD) is an airstrip serving the village of Ceiba Doblada in Usulután Department, El Salvador. The unmarked grass runway is 8 kilometres (5.0 mi) east of the village.

The El Salvador VOR-DME (Ident: CAT) is located 29.4 nautical miles (54.4 km) west-northwest of the airstrip.

== See also ==
- Transport in El Salvador
- List of airports in El Salvador
