= Water resources management in El Salvador =

- Withdrawals by sector 2000: Domestic: 25%; Agriculture: 59.4%; Industry: 15.6%
- Renewable water resources: 17.75 km^{3}
- Surface water produced internally: 25 km^{3}
- Groundwater recharge: 6.15 km^{3}
- Overlap shared by surface water and groundwater: 6 km^{3}
- Renewable water resources per capita: 2,755 m^{3}/year
- Wetland designated as Ramsar sites: 1,333 km^{2} (2010)
- Hydropower generation: 36%

Water resources management in El Salvador is characterized by difficulties in addressing severe water pollution throughout much of the country's surface waters due to untreated discharges of agricultural, domestic and industrial run off. The river that drains the capital city of San Salvador is considered to be polluted beyond the capability of most treatment procedures.

El Salvador has ample groundwater and partly relies on these supplies for domestic purposes. Deforestation has ravaged the country to the point that very little primary forest remains. This has led to substantial difficulties in managing stormwater when hurricanes and tropical storms make landfall.

Torrential rain leads to deadly floods and mudslides that have claimed many lives in El Salvador. A growing urban population coupled with high levels of water losses in urban centers is also challenging water institutions that are not well coordinated. This leads to inefficient water resources management.

== Water management challenges ==
=== Water pollution ===
The Acelhuate River is an important drainage system for El Salvador's capital, San Salvador, and is severely contaminated with heavy metals along with domestic and industrial waste. This water is considered a biohazard, and the contamination is so severe that it is rendered untreatable by treatment methods such as reverse osmosis. Contaminated water from the Acelhuate River flows directly into the Cerron Grande reservoir.

The Cerrón Grande reservoir is overloaded with sewage and industrial waste. In a 2004 study, the El Salvador Ministry of Environment found that the waste is coming from 54 industrial plants, 55 coffee processing plants, seven sugar mills, and 29 sewer systems discharging directly into the reservoir. Cerrón Grande dam was built in 1974 to drive El Salvador's largest hydroelectric project, and the 135 km^{2} reservoir collects some 3,800 tones of excrement each year from the sewage pipes, as well as factory effluents consisting of heavy metals such as chromium and lead.

The sedimentation volumes in the Cerron Grande Reservoir are dangerously high also and estimated to be as high as 7 million m^{3} per year which gravely impacts the health of the reservoir. Many shallow aquifers are becoming contaminated from the severe surface pollution, and this is critically challenging as deeper wells are more relied upon to provide potable water.

In El Salvador, rivers and streams in the principal agricultural areas are highly polluted by pesticides, particularly by DDT in cotton cultivations in the south-eastern coastal plains. Concentrations of 3.15 mg of DDT per litre of water have been discovered in the Río Grande de San Miguel.

=== Flooding and stormwater ===
El Salvador sits directly in the path of tropical storms and hurricanes as evidenced by Hurricane Mitch in 1998 causing US$400 million in damage. Hurricane Stan in 2005 caused considerable flooding throughout El Salvador, resulted in 67 deaths, and displaced more than 50,000 people. Damages from Stan were estimated at US$355 million. There was a tropical storm in 2008 that also led to major flooding and mudslides and killed 199.

Another determining factor in the severe flood waters that plague El Salvador is deforestation. El Salvador is the second most deforested country in Latin America after Haiti. Much of El Salvador's tree cover has been removed, leaving the country vulnerable to flash flooding. Only an estimated 2 per cent of the tree cover that existed before the 10-year civil war remains. Almost 85 percent of its forested cover has disappeared since the 1960s and less than 6,000 hectares are classified as primary forest.

=== Urbanization ===
The urbanized population in El Salvador was 61% in 2008 with an increase of 2% each year. In the case of San Salvador, the urbanized surface of the metropolitan area has increased almost exponentially, from 6.8 km^{2} in 1935 to 91.5 km^{2} in 2000. This has mainly taken place in the largest aquifer recharge areas. Because of this, the areas with the highest rate of infiltration have been reduced, whereas the areas with a low infiltration rate of 0.05 mm/hour have increased by the same proportion.

== Water resource base ==
Lempa River
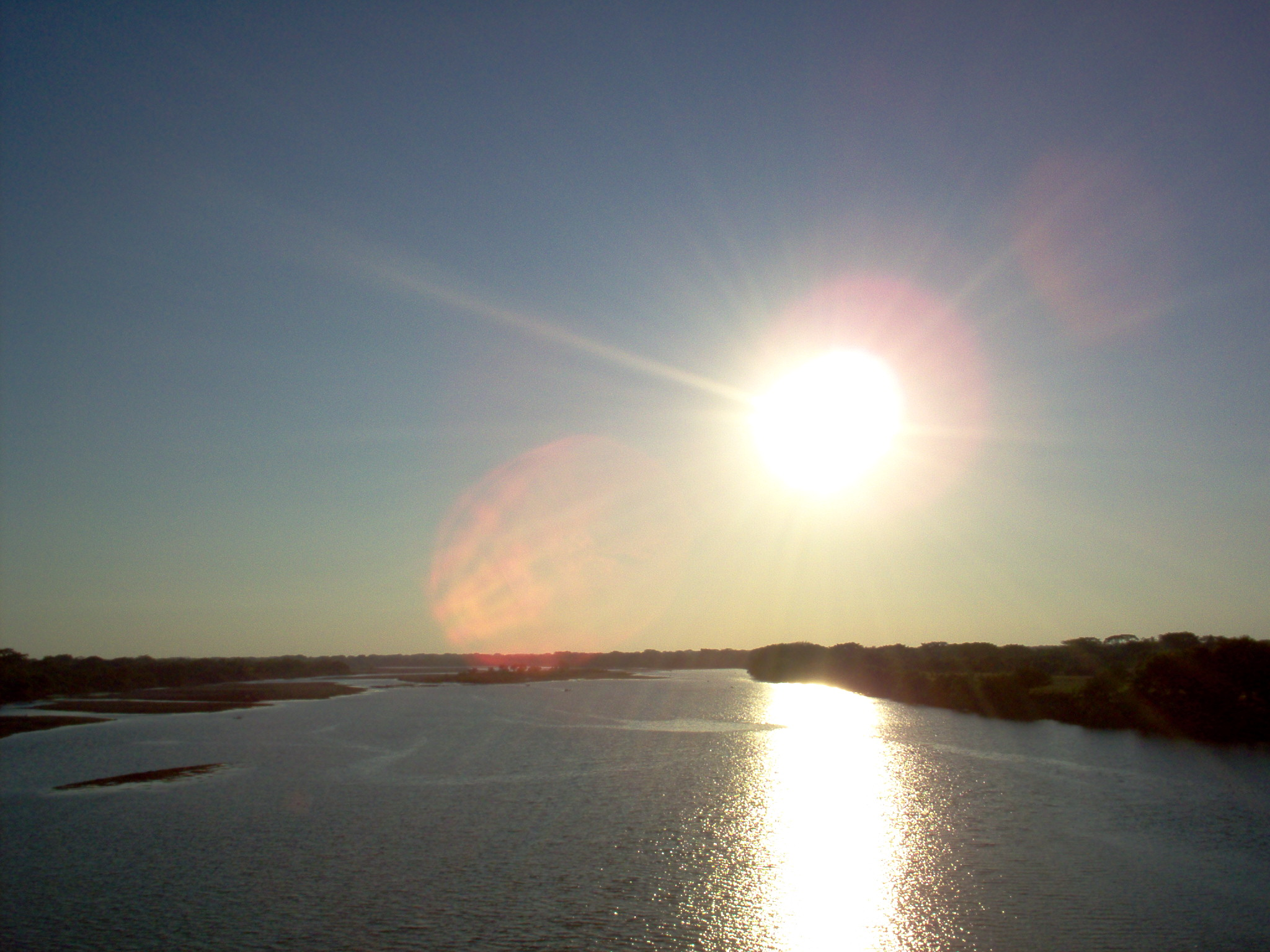
- Sunset over the Lempa river

Physical characteristics
- Source
  - location: Sierra Madre, Guatemala
  - elevation: 1,200 m (3,900 ft)
- Mouth: Pacific Ocean
  - location: El Playón, Tecoluca, El Salvador
- Length: 422 km (262 mi)
- Basin size: 18,246 km^{2} (7,045 sq mi)
- Discharge
  - average: 362 m^{3}/s (12,800 cu ft/s)

It is estimated that El Salvador has 17.3 km^{3} of water resources per year. Approximately 67% or 11.6 km^{3} of this water is surface water. The remaining 5.7 km^{3} are found in groundwater which is heavily relied upon because surface water is generally severely polluted. Precipitation levels are the most significant in the higher elevations varying from about 2, 286 mm in the mountain ranges down to 1,448 mm in coastal plains. About 95% of the rainfall occurs from May to October with frequent and severe droughts occurring during the drier months. Around 84% of the surface runoff takes place during the rainy season (May–October) while the remaining 16% will run off during the dry season.

=== Groundwater and surface water resources ===
El Salvador counts nearly 360 rivers that connect to form ten hydrographic regions. There are four primary lakes in El Salvador including the Ilopango (72 km^{2}), Guija (44 km^{2}), Coatepeque (24.8 km^{2),}, Olomega ( 24.2 km^{2}) and four reservoirs created by hydroelectric dams discussed in more detail below. El Salvador also obtains about 7.5 km^{3} of surface water per year from neighboring Honduras and Guatemala. The Cerrón Grande Reservoir, known locally as Lake Suchitlán, is the largest body of fresh water in El Salvador.

The Lempa River watershed dominates El Salvador covering half of the country at 10, 255 km^{2} and draining 6, 214 million m^{3}. The Lempa is 422 km long and originates in the Sierra Madre and the Sierra del Merendón in southern Guatemala. The river flows in Honduras for 31 km before entering El Salvador in northwest.

Groundwater is heavily relied upon for water supply as a result of polluted surface water, and sufficient supplies of fresh groundwater are available throughout most of the country. Groundwater recharge from infiltration is estimated at 6.15 km^{3} per year whereby 5.97 km^{3} is considered base flow that serves to recharge surface waters and therefore has the possibility of being extracted. The remaining unused water passes down through the river system and discharges into the Pacific Ocean. The best aquifers are located in coastal areas and valleys of the central plateau where substantial groundwater aquifers are located at depths of 10–100 meters.

Table: Principal characteristics in hydrological regions of El Salvador.

Hydrographic Region	Primary rivers	Surface Area (km^{2})	Annual Runoff (million m^{3})	Rainy season annual runoff (million m^{3})	Dry Season annual runoff (million m^{3})
A	Lempa	10, 255	6, 214	5, 217	836
B	Paz	929	466	358	107
C	Sacramento, Sunza	659	369	317	51
D	San Pedro, Sonsonate, Banderas	875	776	654	123
E	Maridinga, Tihuapa	1,146	359	310	50
F	Comalapa, Guayabo	1,717	886	804	95
G	Afluentes de la Bahia de Jiquilisco	958	618	502	115
H	Grande de San Miguel	2, 250	1,161	985	175
I	Afluentes del Golfo de Fonseca	804	299	296	33
J	Sirama y Guascorán	1,348	479	423	56
SubTotal		20,941	11,627	9.867	1,642
Total with Guatemala and Honduras runoff totals added (regions A, B, J)		31,841	17,768	15,017	2,632

Source: FAO 2000

== Water resources management by sector ==
The average per capita availability of water in El Salvador is less than 2,800 m^{3}/year. Per capita annual extraction is 118 m^{3} representing about 4.3% of available supplies. Agriculture uses about 60%, domestic needs are around 24%, and industrial usage is 16%.

=== Water coverage and usage ===
Access to an improved water source in El Salvador was estimated at 76% in 2006. Urban access was 90%, including about 13% lacking a piped connection to the house. Access in rural areas in 2006 was 50%, however only 38% of this total had a piped connection to the house. Most water in rural areas is drawn from groundwater wells.

=== Irrigation and drainage ===
Potential surface area for irrigation if only considering soil type is around 676,000 acres (2,740 km^{2}); however, when adequate availability of water is also considered, the potential surface area for irrigation is about 500,000 acres (2,000 km^{2}). Approximately 56% of water available for irrigation is drawn from surface water while the rest is supplied from groundwater. The highest potential for irrigation is located in the coastal plains where the best groundwater is located. About 24% of the total potential area is classified as having "good" potential, while 60% is classified as having a "moderate" potential, and finally about 15% is classified as having potential with substantial limitations.

The private sector for irrigation has grown substantially since 1950 when only 4,000 acres (16 km^{2}) were under irrigation by the private sector. By 1960, there were 40,000 acres (160 km^{2}) irrigated by the private sector and in 1995, 57,000 acres (230 km^{2}) were being irrigated under private control. A concerted effort to develop the irrigation sector between 1966 and 1991 was put forth by the Ministry of Agriculture (MAG) through their General Directorate of Irrigation and Drainage. MAG enacted irrigation districts in Zapotitán (7,400 acres), and Atiocoyo (9,760 acres) with an investment of US $24.7 million and later developed the Lempa-Acahuapa district at a cost of US $21.2 million.

Since 1975, growth in private sector irrigation has stabilized where grass crops have been replaced with higher value crops with a larger profit margin. The distribution of publicly managed irrigation are located mostly in the Sonsonate, Sensunapán, Banderas, and San Pedro watersheds. Public irrigation projects are also prevalent in other areas where good water and soil are located such as the Lempa River, Titihuapa, Sucio, Torola, Grande, and Suquiapa basins. The beneficiaries of public irrigation are organized into 36 associations.

Total surface area with irrigation drainage problems was estimated at 370,658 acres (1,500.00 km^{2}) where most of this land is located in coastal plains. These coastal regions are home to many mangroves and marshes, therefore land remains saturated. There have been successful past efforts to pump off or convey excess water left behind after the rainy season. While drainage is a problem, salinity problems have not been widely detected in the soil.

=== Hydroelectricity ===
Hydroelectric potential is estimated at 1,889 MW where 1,409 MW of this potential is on the Lempa River. However, only 21% of the potential of the Lempa River is utilized. CEL (Comisión Hidroeléctrica del Río Lempa) is a public entity that generates over 90% of the hydroelectric output of El Salvador. Four projects on the Lempa River constitute all of the hydroelectricity generation in El Salvador and account for 41% of the total electricity produced in the country.

Projects include:

- 5 de Noviembre with 81.4 MW installed generation capacity
- Guajoyo with 15MW of installed generation capacity
- Cerrón Grande Hydroelectric Dam with 135 MW of installed generation capacity. The dam's reservoir has a surface area of 135 km^{2} and a capacity of 2,180 million m^{3}.
- 15 de Septiembre with 156.3 MW installed generation capacity including and upgrade to 24 MW of new installed capacity

New Hydroelectric projects include:

- Cimarron Hydroelectric Power Project is a project whose construction is expected to begin in 2010 and will also be on the Lempa River within the upper river basin in the Santa Ana Department. Water will be diverted from the Lempa River to a power generation site near the town of Agua Caliente. Installed capacity will be 261 MW and will generate an average of 686 GWh per year. The dam will be 165 meters high and 660 meters long and create a reservoir holding 592 million m^{3} of water.
- El Chaparral will have 66 MW of installed generation capacity

== Legal and institutional framework ==
Twenty-five agencies share responsibility for overseeing the water resources of El Salvador. There is currently no mechanism for coordinating their efforts, which creates duplication and inefficient use of resources. The El Salvador Congress charged the Secretaria Ejecutiva del Medio Ambiente (SEMA) with the responsibility of setting the national environmental regulatory policy and to also enforce its compliance. As of 1998, land use regulations rested with the Administracion Nacional de Acueductos y Alcantarillados (ANDA) but these regulations were lacking the necessary enforcement tools. Although there is a general lack of enforcement, laws for regulating discharge of domestic and industrial wastes exist, but only for new industries.

=== Legal framework ===
- 1961: Law of the National Administration for Water Supply and Sanitation (ANDA) was passed to create ANDA.
- 2007: Approval procedure by Act 2095 for the revision of technical plans to introduce a certification process for feasible drinking water projects.

=== Institutional framework ===
- ANDA (Administración Nacional de Acueductos y Alcantarillados) is the National administration for water supply and sanitation. The mission of ANDA is to provide adequate supplies of water for human consumption in quantities demanded by consumers and to treat sewage.
- DGFCR (General Directorate of Forestry, River Basin and Irrigation Management) is under the Ministry of Farming and agriculture and is in charge of generating and distributing information, providing technical and legal assistance about water resources, and implementing programs contributing to the sustainable development of water resources in El Salvador. The irrigation and drainage division of DGFCR is in charge of administrating and regulating the irrigation systems.
- CEL (Comisión Ejecutiva Hidroeléctrica del Río Lempa) is the Lempa River Executive Hydroelectric Commission whose role is to develop and utilize the hydroelectric potential of the country.
- SNET (Servicio Nacional de Estudios Territoriales) conducts national studies on many sectors. Specific to water resources, their focus is on the following: monitoring and evaluation of contaminated waters and related health risks, vulnerability to aquifers and contamination due to over-exploitation, and analysis of floods, water availability, equity of water supplies, and the effects of climate change on water resources.
- MARN is the Ministry of Environment and Natural Resources created in 1997, is the environmental authority in the country. Among other functions it oversees El Salvador's commitments to the United Nations Framework Convention on Climate Change (UNFCCC) and other climate change related actions.
- FISDL (Fondo de Inversion Social de El Salvador) is the Social Investment Fund of El Salvador and supplies the materials and expertise needed for the development and construction of ground and surface water supply projects for rural areas.
- MSPAS (Ministerio de Salud Pública y Asistencia Social) is the Public Health and Social Assistance Ministry and is responsible for financing small infrastructure projects and the provision of equipment for health, potable water, sanitation, and other programs. Their mission is to reduce the negative effects of failing infrastructures, namely those existing in communities experiencing extreme poverty.

== Cooperation with Guatemala and Honduras ==
The upper watershed of the Lempa River is shared by Guatemala, El Salvador, and Honduras, as outlined in the Trifinio Plan, which was established and signed by the aforementioned countries to address economic and environmental problems in the Lempa River basin, and foster cooperation and regional integration. The Trifinio plan or treaty sought to provide a more viable and effective alternative to unilateral development thereby concentrating on greater multinational integration.

The Trifinio region covers an area of about 7,500 km^{2} in the border areas of Honduras, Guatemala, and El Salvador. The region is made up of 45 municipalities whereby 22 belong to Honduras within the departments of Ocotepeque and Copán, 15 are situated in Guatemala corresponding to the departments of Chiquimula and Jutiapa, and 8 are in the departments of Santa Ana and Chalatenango in El Salvador. In the early stages of the Trifinio Plan's development, the commission studied three international river basins, and in 1987 they developed a new plan involving the Lempa River Basin, the Ulúa River, and the Motagua River. However, the Motagua and Ulúa rivers were eventually dropped, leaving the Lempa River as the Trifinio Plan's primary focus.

In 1996, the governments of El Salvador, Honduras, and Guatemala signed an agreement to cooperate on formulating a development plan for their shared boundary region. In 1998, the signatories completed the Central American Action Plan for integrated development of water resources to combat water pollution and promote the sustainable development of Central America's shared water resources by jointly developing watershed management plans. These plans included reforestation efforts which concluded in the second phase of the Trifinio Plan in 1997. By 2000 new efforts were initiated to begin managing the upper Lempa River Basin.

== Ramsar wetland sites in El Salvador ==
Lake Olomega
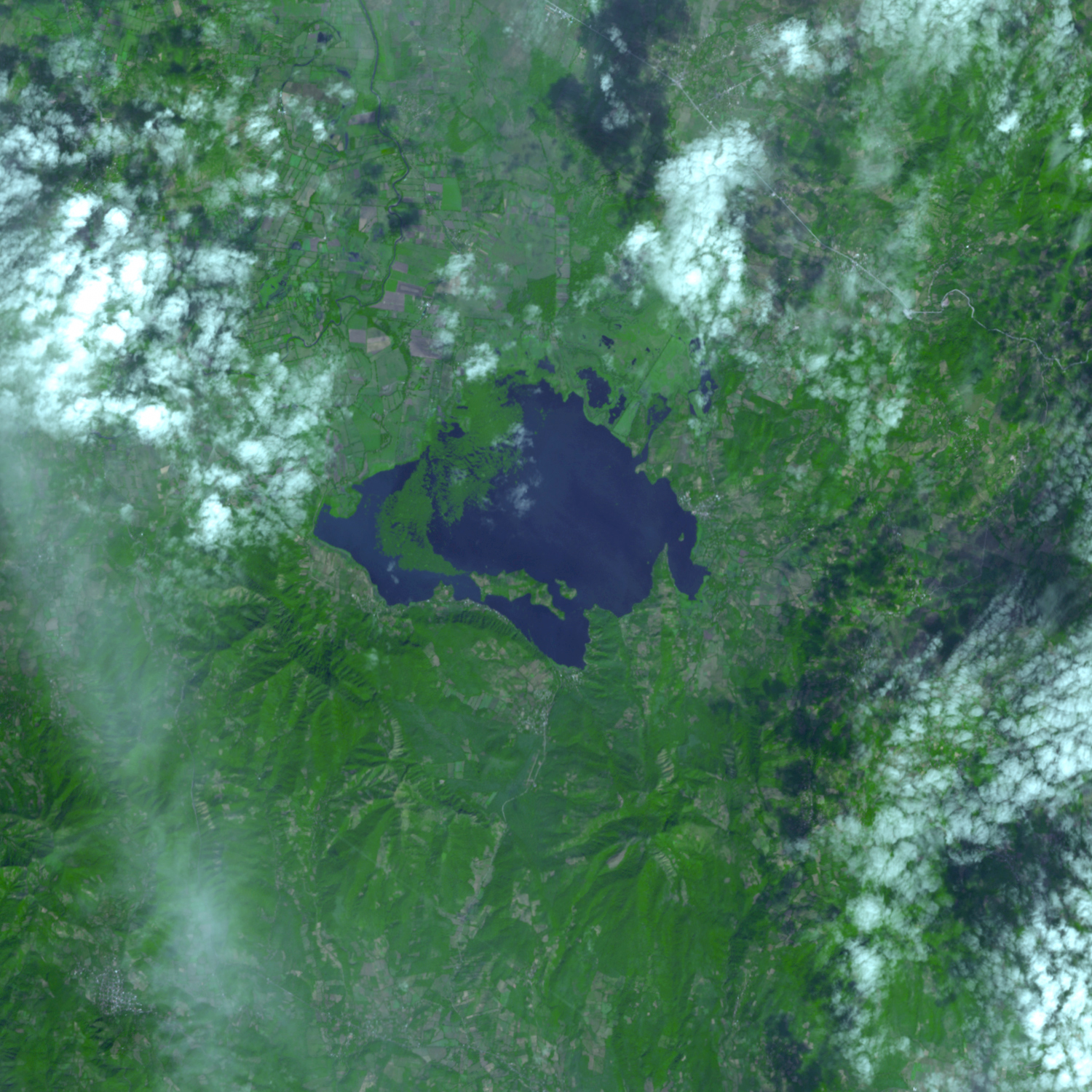

- Location within El Salvador Location within Central America
- Location: South-Eastern El Salvador
- Coordinates: 13°19′N 88°04′W
- Primary inflows: Río Grande de San Miguel
- Basin countries: El Salvador

Wetlands in El Salvador serve many crucial water management services such as flood control, groundwater replenishment, natural water purification, and are also productive fish and shrimp ecosystems. The wetlands within the Bahía de Jiquilisco for example are primarily mangrove forests that serve to protect against tidal surges when hurricanes and tropical storms strike. Without these forests, tidal surges would lead to the salination of fresh groundwater further inland which would contaminate supplies for domestic and agricultural uses.

The Ramsar Convention wetland sites:

- Complejo Bahía de Jiquilisco in the state of Usulután (63,500 ha, 156,911 acres)
- Embalse Cerrón Grande in Chalatenango, San Salvador, Cuscatlán, Cabañas (60,698 ha, 150,000 acres)
- Laguna de Olomega in the states of San Miguel and La Unión (7,557 ha, 18,673 acres)
- Area Natural Protegida Laguna del Jocotal (1,571 ha, 3,882 acres)

== Potential climate change impacts ==
The Global Climate Risk Index constructed for the period between 1997 and 2006 and covering both human and economic impacts, ranks El Salvador the 30th most at risk country in the world. According to climate scenarios developed by researchers for El Salvador, the following (below) climate changes are likely to occur between 2070 and 2099 and adversely impact groundwater, hydropower output, and flood control management efforts.

- Average temperatures will rise be between 1.9-3.4 °C increasing likelihood of drought
- Significant temperature increases will occur in June and July
- Precipitation decreases early in rainy season reducing infiltration to groundwater supplies
- Greatest decrease in precipitation in May–July
- Average inflows to the major reservoirs will decline by 13-24%
- The greatest declines in reservoir inflow will be between July–August and be around 21 to 41% affecting hydropower output and irrigation supplies
- Drop in hydropower generation capability may range from 33% to 53% near the end of the 21st century
- Sea level increase: it is probable that the sea level will increase 20 cm by 2030, 40 cm by 2040, and up to 70 cm by 2100. This will contaminate coastal groundwater with high concentrations of saline water and greatly reduce supply for domestic and agricultural uses.

The Drought Response and Mitigation Project in El Salvador, implemented by the Red Cross in 2002 helped to mitigate the effects of droughts affecting the country. The objective of this initiative was to increase the capacity of subsistence farmers in the east of the country to better respond to adverse effects of climate conditions, by providing technical assistance to diversify and market crops, reforestation using fruit trees, use of organic fertilizers and small scale irrigation systems.

== See also ==
- Water supply and sanitation in El Salvador
