= El Zapote Airport =

- IATA: none; ICAO: MSZT

Summary
- Airport type: Public
- Serves: San Francisco Menéndez, El Salvador
- Elevation AMSL: 6 ft / 2 m
- Coordinates: 13°42′29″N 90°01′35″W

Map
- Location of the airport in El Salvador

Runways
Direction	Length		Surface
Direction	m	ft	Surface
11/29	2,500	8,202	Asphalt
- Source: Google Maps OurAirports

El Zapote Airport (ICAO: MSZT) is an airport serving the village of El Zapote in San Francisco Menéndez in Ahuachapán, El Salvador. The runway is located on the Barra de Santiago at the mouth of the Rio Aguachapío.

The airport was renovated in 2026 and opened in April of that year.

== See also ==
- Transport in El Salvador
- List of airports in El Salvador
