= Las Cachas Airport =

- IATA: none; ICAO: MSCS

Summary
- Airport type: Public
- Serves: Cangrejera, El Salvador
- Elevation AMSL: 51 ft / 16 m
- Coordinates: 13°28′00″N 89°11′29″W

Map
- Location of the airport in El Salvador

Runways
Direction	Length		Surface
Direction	m	ft	Surface
03/21	700	2,297	Grass
- Source: Google Maps

Las Cachas Airport (ICAO: MSCS) is an airstrip serving the hamlet of Cangrejera in La Libertad Department, El Salvador.

The Amatecampo non-directional beacon (Ident: LAN) is located 4.5 nautical miles (8.3 km) southeast of the airstrip. The El Salvador VOR-DME (Ident: CAT) is located 8.5 nautical miles (15.7 km) east of the airstrip.

== See also ==
- Transport in El Salvador
- List of airports in El Salvador
