= El Palmer Airport =

El Palmar Airport
- IATA: none; ICAO: MSSA

Summary
- Airport type: Closed
- Serves: Santa Ana
- Elevation AMSL: 2,600 ft (790 m)
- Coordinates: 13°58′21″N 089°34′14″W

Map
- Location of the facility in El Salvador

Runways
Direction	Length		Surface
Direction	ft	m	Surface
Closed
- Source: Google Maps

El Palmar Airport (ICAO: MSSA), also known as Santa Ana Airport, was an airstrip serving a number of communities in west-central Santa Ana Department, 3 kilometres (1.9 mi) south of the city of Santa Ana, El Salvador.

== History ==
El Palmar airport served as a military and civilian airstrip, it was constructed in 1931 under the government of General Maximiliano Hernandez Martinez, it was located in a finca called La Palma south of Barrio Nuevo (Now Altos del Palmar) at an elevation of 2,152 feet. The total area of the property was around nine and a half hectares in which the runway had a dimension of 2,600 by 26 feet. The runway was made primarily of grass, the heading was 20/02, and at the end of the runway were located several hangars, for private and military aircraft to be stored on.

Until 1939 it was owned and maintained by an aviation committee called "Pro-Campo de Aviación de Santa Ana", after that it was handed over to Santa Ana's municipality. Santa Ana City saw prosperity and economic growth, which lead to an increase in buildings construction around the airport, one of which is Santa Ana's Stadium, Oscar Quiteño. This created an obstacle for the airplanes that landed on runway 20 or departed from runway 02. During the Salvadoran Civil War, members of the terrorist group FPL, attacked the airport during the night of June 3, 1979, burning the hangars and three aircraft that were stored in them. The airplanes had the following registries: YS-125P, YS-248P and YS-220P.

=== Closure ===
After the 1980s the airport slowly deteriorated over time, the only maintenance it received was bush trimming. During the 1990s through the 2000s it was used as a state fair terrain, and finally in 2010 it became a residential center named "Condominios Procavia".

== See also ==
- Transport in El Salvador
- List of airports in El Salvador
