= Corral de Mulas Airport =

Airport in El Salvador

Corral De Mulas Airport
- IATA: none; ICAO: MSCM

Summary
- Airport type: Public
- Serves: Corral De Mulas, El Salvador
- Elevation AMSL: 26 ft / 8 m
- Coordinates: 13°12′20″N 88°32′50″W

Map
- Location of the airport in El Salvador

Runways
Direction	Length		Surface
Direction	m	ft	Surface
10/28	1,070	3,510	Grass
- Source: Google Maps Our Airports

Corral De Mulas Airport (ICAO: MSCM) is an airport serving the village of Corral De Mulas in Usulután Department, El Salvador. The unmarked grass runway is west of and adjacent to the village.

The El Salvador VOR-DME (Ident: CAT) is located 32.5 nautical miles (60.2 km) west-northwest of the airstrip.

== See also ==
- Transport in El Salvador
- List of airports in El Salvador
