= Santa Rosa de Lima Airport =

- IATA: none; ICAO: none; LID: SV-0004

Summary
- Airport type: Public
- Serves: Santa Rosa de Lima
- Elevation AMSL: 239 ft / 73 m
- Coordinates: 13°36′58″N 87°51′45″W

Map
- Location of the airport in El Salvador

Runways
Direction	Length		Surface
Direction	m	ft	Surface
07/25	980	3,215	Grass
- Source: Google Maps OurAirports

Santa Rosa de Lima Airport is an airport serving the city of Santa Rosa de Lima in La Unión Department, El Salvador. The runway is 3 kilometres (1.9 mi) east of the city.

There is distant rising terrain south through southwest.

== See also ==
- Transport in El Salvador
- List of airports in El Salvador
