= La Cabaña Airport =

Airport in El Salvador

- IATA: none; ICAO: MSLC

Summary
- Airport type: Public
- Serves: La Cabaña, El Salvador
- Elevation AMSL: 885 ft / 270 m
- Coordinates: 14°00′35″N 89°11′05″W

Map
- Location of the airport in El Salvador

Runways
Direction	Length		Surface
Direction	m	ft	Surface
02/20	1,030	3,379	Grass
- Source: Google Maps OurAirports

La Cabaña Airport (ICAO: MSLC) is an airstrip serving the town of La Cabaña. It is located in the municipality of El Paisnal in San Salvador Department, El Salvador.

The El Salvador VOR-DME (Ident: CAT) is located 35.1 nautical miles (65.0 km) south-southeast of La Cabaña Airport. The Ilopango VOR-DME (Ident: CAT) is located 19.6 nautical miles (36.3 km) south-southeast of the airstrip.

== See also ==
- Transport in El Salvador
- List of airports in El Salvador
