= Gerardo Barrios Bypass =

Bypass road in El Salvador

- Periférico Gerardo Barrios
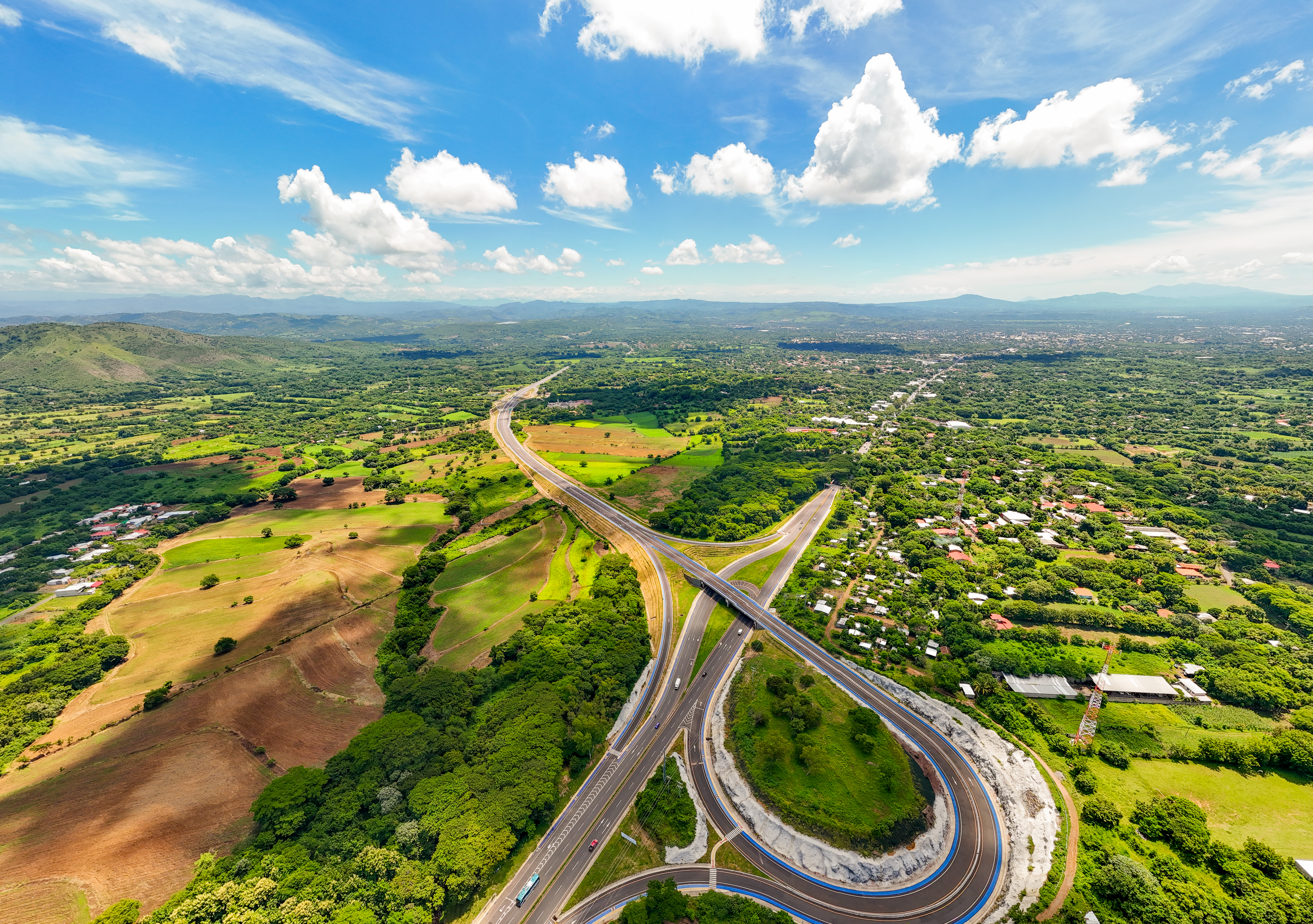
- Western terminus of the bypass (left road)

Route information
- Length: 12.9 mi (20.8 km)
- Status: Operational
- Existed: 1 December 2024–present

Major junctions
- West end: Pan-American Highway in Quelepa
- Ruta Militar in San Miguel
- East end: Pan-American Highway in San Miguel

Location
- Country: El Salvador
- Departments: San Miguel

Highway system
- Transport in El Salvador

The Gerardo Barrios Bypass (Spanish: Periférico Gerardo Barrios) is a road in El Salvador located in the San Miguel Department that bypasses the city of San Miguel. The road travels north of San Miguel for 12.9 miles (20.8 km).

== History ==
=== Proposal ===
In 2014, Salvadoran president Salvador Sánchez Cerén proposed building a bypass road around city of San Miguel in order to shorten travel times along the Pan-American Highway. In August 2014, the Salvadoran government granted a $120 million contract to the Japan International Cooperation Agency (JICA) to build the bypass. On 30 April 2015, the Legislative Assembly approved the construction of the bypass, but by the end of Sánchez Cerén's presidency in mid-2019, construction never commenced. In June 2019, Sánchez Cerén's successor, Nayib Bukele, ordered the Ministry of Public Works (MOP) to initiate plans to build the proposed bypass in San Miguel and announced that it would be called the "Gerardo Barrios Bypass".

=== Construction ===
Construction on the Gerardo Barrios Bypass began in late 2019. JICA helped the MOP build the Gerardo Barrios Bypass which cost $174 million. Phase one of the bypass' construction involved the widening of the Pan-American Highway from 2 to 4 lanes in El Obrajuelo, Quelepa where the bypass' western terminus was planned to be built; this was completed in October 2021. Phase two involved the paving of a 5.2-mile-long (8.4 km) stretch of the bypass from the Pan-American Highway to Hato Nuevo and phase four involved the construction of bridges over the Grande and Taisihuat Rivers; both phases were completed in January 2024. Phase three involved the completion of the bypass' eastern section from Hato Nuevo to El Papalón.

On 1 December 2024, Bukele inaugurated the completed Gerardo Barrios Bypass. After the bypass' completion, Manuel Flores, the secretary-general of the Farabundo Martí National Liberation Front (FMLN), stated that the bypass was the "strategic planning" ("planificación estratégica") of the FMLN (the party that Sánchez Cerén was a member of when its construction was initially proposed in 2014). The bypass opened to traffic on 2 December 2024.

== Route ==
The Gerardo Barrios Bypass is 12.9 miles (20.8 km) long. Its western terminus is located in El Obrajuelo and its eastern terminus is located in El Papalón. Approximately halfway through the bypass' route, it has a 4-way roundabout junction with the Ruta Militar in Hato Nuevo that travels north from San Miguel. The bypass crosses the Grande, Jalacatal, Papalón, and Taisihuat Rivers.

The Gerardo Barrios Bypass includes bike lanes, 12 bus stops, and an elevated crosswalk.

== See also ==
- Apopa Bypass
- Transport in El Salvador
