= El Ronco Airport =

- IATA: none; ICAO: MSRC

Summary
- Airport type: Closed
- Serves: Metapán, El Salvador
- Elevation AMSL: 1,460 ft / 445 m
- Coordinates: 14°19′07″N 89°30′25″W

Map
- Location in El Salvador

Runways
Direction	Length		Surface
Direction	m	ft	Surface
Closed
- Sources: Google Maps HERE Maps

El Ronco Airport (ICAO: MSRC) was an airport formerly serving the Holcim, Ltd. El Ronco cement plant 5 kilometres (3.1 mi) west of Metapán in Santa Ana Department, El Salvador.

Google Earth Historical Imagery shows the 950 metres (3,120 ft) grass runway closed some time after 2004, and construction of plant facilities on the northern half begun in 2011.

== See also ==
- Transport in El Salvador
- List of airports in El Salvador
