= El Jagüey Airfield =

Airport in El Salvador

El Jagüey Airfield Aeródromo El Jagüey
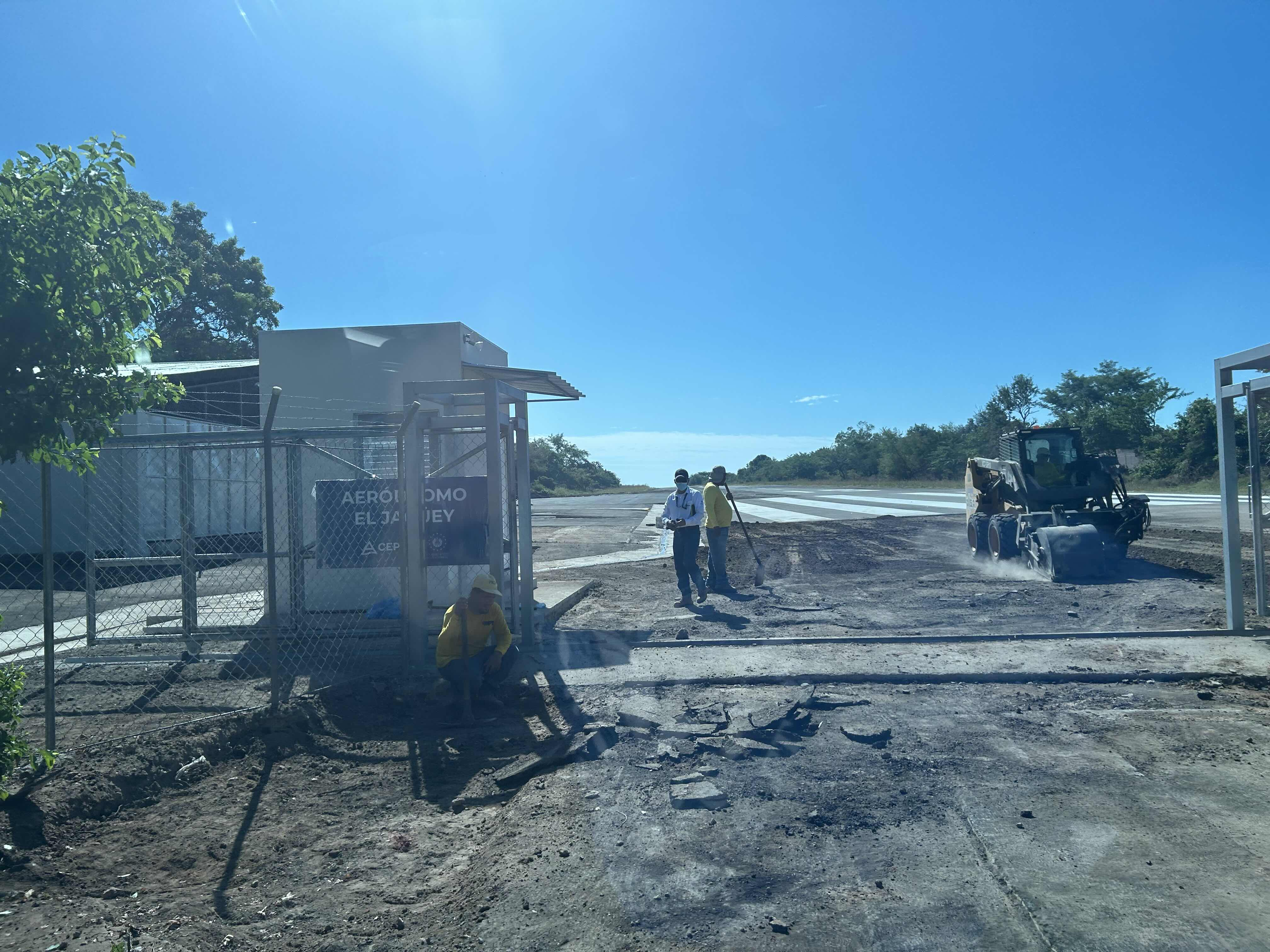
- The airfield undergoing renovations in 2024
- IATA: none; ICAO: MSET

Summary
- Airport type: Public
- Owner: Government of El Salvador
- Operator: Autonomous Port Executive Commission (CEPA)
- Serves: El Tamarindo
- Location: Conchagua, El Salvador
- Time zone: CST (UTC–6)
- Elevation AMSL: 3 m / 10 ft
- Coordinates: 13°09′45″N 87°54′17″W

Map
- Location in El Salvador

Runways
Direction	Length		Surface
Direction	m	ft	Surface
15/33	1,340	4,396	Asphalt
- Sources: CEPA, GCM

El Jagüey Airfield (ICAO: MSET), also known as the El Tamarindo Airport, is an airport located in Conchagua serving El Tamarindo, a coastal town in the La Unión Department of El Salvador.

== History ==
El Jagüey Airfield was renovated in 2024 by the Autonomous Port Executive Commission (CEPA) and reopened on 18 January 2025 with a new passenger terminal.

== Facilities ==
El Jagüey Airfield has one 1,340-meter-long (4,400 ft) by 20-meter-wide (66 ft) runway numbered 15/33 and made of asphalt. The airfield has a passenger terminal and an aircraft hangar.

== See also ==
- List of airports in El Salvador
- Transport in El Salvador
