= Los Comandos Airport =

- IATA: none; ICAO: MSLD

Summary
- Airport type: Public
- Serves: San Francisco Gotera
- Elevation AMSL: 919 ft (280 m)
- Coordinates: 13°43′35″N 88°06′25″W

Map
- Location of the airport in El Salvador

Runways
Direction	Length		Surface
Direction	m	ft	Surface
01/19	985	3,232	Asphalt
- Source: Google Maps GCM

Los Comandos Airport (ICAO: MSLD) is an airstrip serving the town of San Francisco Gotera in Morazán Department, El Salvador.

The runway is 3 kilometres (1.9 mi) north of the town. There is rising terrain to the north.

The Soto Cano VORTAC (Ident: ESC) is located 48.9 nautical miles (90.6 km) northeast of Los Comandos. The Toncontin VOR-DME (Ident: TNT) is located 54.3 nautical miles (100.6 km) east-northeast of the airstrip.

== Incidents ==
On 9 November, 2000, a Basler BT-67 FAS119 of the Salvadoran Air Force was damaged beyond economic repair on landing at the airport. The aircraft suffered brake failure, overran the runway and collided with a tree.

== See also ==
- Transport in El Salvador
- List of airports in El Salvador
