= El Platanar Airport =

Airport in El Salvador

- IATA: none; ICAO: MSPT

Summary
- Airport type: Public
- Serves: El Platanar, El Salvador
- Elevation AMSL: 819 ft / 250 m
- Coordinates: 13°35′13″N 88°17′50″W

Map
- Location of the airport in El Salvador

Runways
Direction	Length		Surface
Direction	m	ft	Surface
10/28	1,000	3,281	Grass
- Source: Google Maps

El Platanar Airport (ICAO: MSPT) is an airport serving the town of El Platanar in San Miguel Department, El Salvador. The runway is 1 kilometre (0.6 mi) northwest of the city.

El Platanar town is 16 kilometres (10 mi) northwest of San Miguel, the department capital.

== See also ==
- Transport in El Salvador
- List of airports in El Salvador
