= La Aramuaca Airport =

- IATA: none; ICAO: MSSM

Summary
- Airport type: Public
- Serves: San Miguel
- Elevation AMSL: 283 ft / 86 m
- Coordinates: 13°26′52″N 88°07′12″W

Map
- Location of the airport in El Salvador

Runways
Direction	Length		Surface
Direction	m	ft	Surface
12/30	790	2,592	Grass
- Source: Google Maps

La Aramuaca Airport (ICAO: MSSM) is an airport serving the city of San Miguel in San Miguel Department, El Salvador. The runway is 5 kilometres (3.1 mi) southeast of the city.

The El Papalon Airport runway parallels the La Aramuaca runway, and is only 800 metres (2,600 ft) southwest.

== See also ==
- Transport in El Salvador
- List of airports in El Salvador
