= RN-5 (El Salvador highway) =

Highway in El Salvador

- Autopista Comalapa; Boulevard de Los Proceres
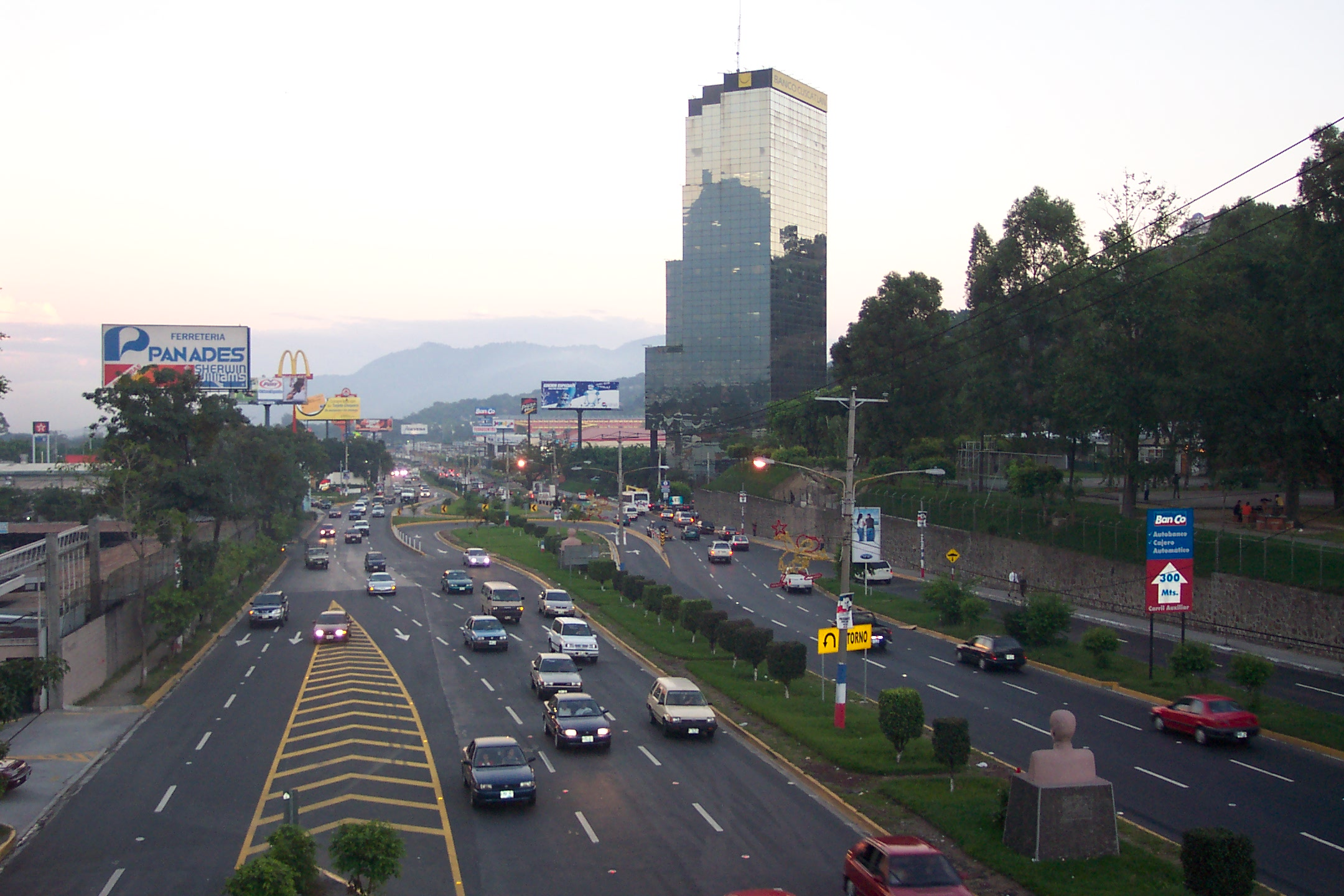

Route information
- Length: 40.7 km (25.3 mi)

Major junctions
- From: RN-21 (Boulevard Diego Holguin), San Salvador, El Salvador
- Avenida Las Amapolas - San Salvador 49a Avenida Sur - San Salvador; Avenida Jose Antonio Rodriguez Pohl - San Salvador; RN-6 (Calle A Los Planes) - San Salvador; Calle Alberto Masferrer - San Marcos; RN-3 (Calle a Cojutepeque) - Santiago Texacuangos CA-2 (Carretera del Litoral) - San Luis Talpa
- To: Circunvalacion Autopista Comalapa - El Salvador International Airport, San Luis Talpa, El Salvador

Location
- Country: El Salvador

Highway system
- Transport in El Salvador

The RN-5 (Autopista Comalapa, Boulevard Los Proceres) serves as one of the main highways in the Metropolitan Area of San Salvador. The highway connects the metropolitan area with the El Salvador International Airport, located in San Luis Talpa, La Paz, a municipality that borders the San Salvador Department. The highway was built to replace the old Carretera al Aeropuerto, a small road that runs on the side of a mountain range, parallel to the Autopista Comalapa. The road has been turned into a scenic route. It overlooks the new RN-5 and the southern hills of the San Salvador Department. The total length of the highway is 40.7 kilometres (25.3 mi). It is currently the only highway that connects the airport to the metropolitan area. Other highways intersect with the RN-5 to provide connection to other departments in the country. The construction of the first Carretera a Comalapa began in 1980. The construction of the RN-5 began in 2001 and was completed and inaugurated on November 22, 2002. The part of the highway known as Boulevard de Los Proceres runs through the southern side of the city of San Salvador. The highway is also a vital area in the city. It gives access to various restaurants, business centers, and other dealerships.

== History ==
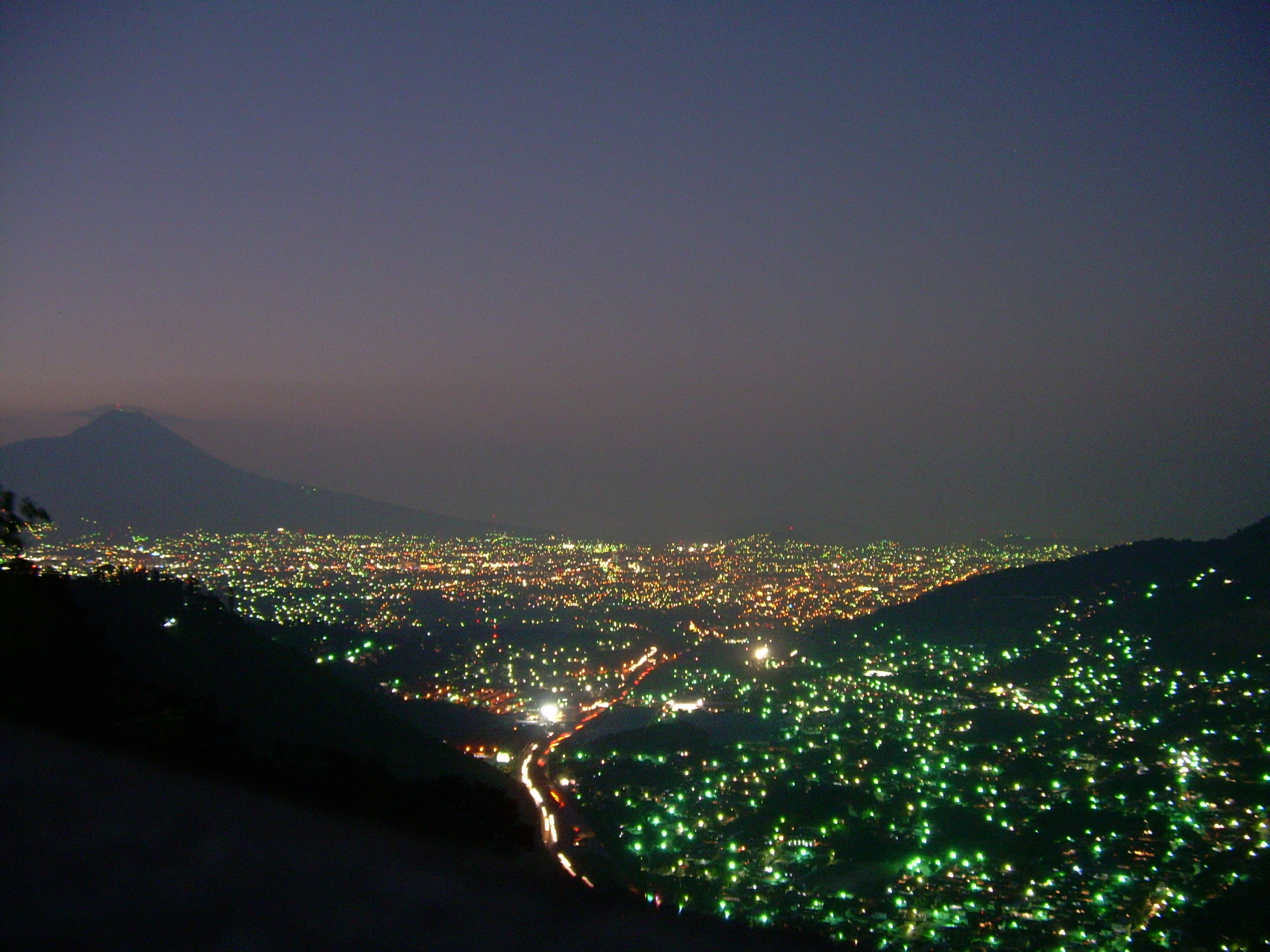
The highway in the bottom of the image is the RN-5 Comalapa, in San Marcos and heading into San Salvador, the city in the background

The first RN-5 is now a scenic parkway, that runs parallel to the current highway. It was built in the 1980s to connect the metropolitan area with the southern municipalities and with the new El Salvador International Airport. The El Salvador airport is the only one in Central America that was built outside any urban area in order to have flat land for runway construction and enough space for future expansion without disturbing urban life.

=== Reconstruction ===
Francisco Flores, the president of El Salvador, inaugurated the remodeled RN-5 (Autopista Comalapa) that stretches from the Metropolitan Area of San Salvador all the way down to the El Salvador International Airport in San Luis Talpa.

The cost of reconstruction of the RN-5 was US$25,000,000. The project will benefit the lives of about 700,000 people living in the surrounding areas, plus everyone in the metropolitan area that uses the International Airport. About 11.23 kilometres (6.98 mi) of the RN-5 has a total of six lanes, (three lanes in each direction). As it exits the urban area, the highway has four lanes (two in each direction).

=== Today ===
Today the highway carries 100,000 vehicles per week. It is the main artery that connects the metropolitan area with the airport, and with the CA-2, the highway that runs on the Salvadoran Coast.

== Junctions and Exits ==
Speed Limit	Interchange	Road/Highway (Via/Carretera)	City	km (north-south)
		RN-21 (Boulevard Diego Holguin)	San Salvador	0
		Calle Albert Einstein/Prolongacion a Montserrat	San Salvador	0.8
		49ª Avenida Sur/ Calle a Montserrat	San Salvador	2.3
		Avenida Jose Antonio Rodriguez Pohl	San Salvador	3.5
		RN-6 (Calle Antigua a los Planes)	San Salvador	5.4
		Calle a San Marcos	San Marcos	10.8
		RN-3 (Carretera a Cojutepeque)/Antigua Carretera (Panoramica)	Santiago Texacuangos	15.8
		Calle a Olocuilta	Olocuilta	25.4
		CA-2 (Carretera del Litoral	San Juan Talpa	37.3
		Circunvalacion Autopista Comalapa	San Luis Talapa	40.7
