= El Papalón Airport =

- IATA: none; ICAO: MSSM

Summary
- Airport type: Public
- Serves: San Miguel
- Elevation AMSL: 285 ft (87 m)
- Coordinates: 13°26′40″N 88°07′40″W

Map
- Location of the airport in El Salvador

Runways
Direction	Length		Surface
Direction	m	ft	Surface
13/31	990	3,248	Asphalt
- Source: Google Maps GCM

El Papalón Airport (ICAO: MSSM) is an airport serving the city of San Miguel in San Miguel Department, El Salvador. The runway is 5 kilometres (3.1 mi) southeast of the city, alongside the Pan American Highway.

The La Aramuaca Airport runway parallels the El Papalon runway, and is only 800 metres (2,600 ft) northeast.

== See also ==
- Transport in El Salvador
- List of airports in El Salvador
