= Puerto El Triunfo =

Municipality in Usulután Department, El Salvador

Coordinates: 13°17′N 88°33′W

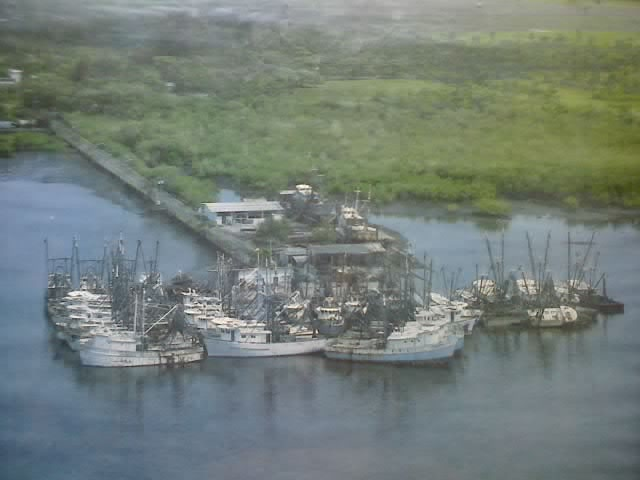
Fishing wharf of Puerto El Triunfo

Puerto El Triunfo is a municipality in the Usulután department of El Salvador.

Beginning as a coffee trade port, Puerto El Triunfo was founded in 1875 as a need for the exportation of the coffee industry in northern Usulután. This city is located in the south of the department, with an increasing tourism rate, it is the most visited touristic place in the department of Usulután due to its location in Jiquilisco Bay Biosphere Reserve and the modern ways of transportation around the bay. Most people in Puerto El Triunfo live on seafood trade and tourism.
