= Apopa Bypass =

Bypass road in El Salvador

- Bypass de Apopa

Route information
- Length: 4.8 km (3.0 mi)
- Status: Under construction

Major junctions
- North end: Northern Trunk Highway in Apopa
- South end: Gold Highway in Apopa

Location
- Country: El Salvador
- Departments: San Salvador

Highway system
- Transport in El Salvador

The Apopa Bypass (Spanish: Bypass de Apopa) is a planned bypass road in El Salvador. The road will connect the Northern Trunk Highway and the Gold Highway and bypass the city of Apopa in the northern San Salvador Metropolitan Area.

== History ==
On 3 September 2024, the Legislative Assembly of El Salvador approved funds to build a bypass road in Apopa intended to reduce traffic in the northern San Salvador Metropolitan Area. On 11 February 2026, Romeo Rodríguez, the minister of public works, announced the bypass' official route. The project is expected to cost $270 million.

Construction is scheduled to begin in December 2026 and is expected to last 24 months.

== Route ==
The Apopa Bypass is planned to connect the Northern Trunk Highway to the Gold Highway. In the north, an intersection will be built at the junction between the Northern Trunk Highway and the road to Tonacatepeque. In the south, another intersection will be built in Caserío Los Elías. The bypass will be 4.8 kilometres (3.0 mi) long and will include 12 bridges. A 400-metre-long (1,300 ft) bridge will cross the Las Cañas River. The road will have four lanes.
