= Water supply and sanitation in El Salvador =

Data
- Access to an at least basic water source: 93% (2015)
- Access to at least basic sanitation: 91% (2015)
- Share of collected wastewater treated: 2%
- Continuity of supply: Low
- Average urban water use (L/person/day): 118
- Average urban water and sanitation tariff (US$/m^{3}): $6/month
- Share of household metering: 64%
- Annual investment in WSS: $2/capita (2003–2004)
- Share of self-financing by utilities: 21% (1990–2002), almost zero in 2005
- Share of tax-financing: 16% (1990–2002)
- Share of external financing: 63% (1990–2002)

Institutions
- Decentralization to municipalities: Limited
- National water and sanitation company: Yes
- Water and sanitation regulator: None
- Responsibility for policy setting: Presidency of the Republic
- Sector law: None
- No. of urban service providers: 97
- No. of rural service providers: 800

Access to drinking water and sanitation in El Salvador has been increased significantly. A 2015 conducted study by the University of North Carolina called El Salvador the country that has achieved the greatest progress in the world in terms of increased access to water supply and sanitation and the reduction of inequity in access between urban and rural areas. However, water resources are heavily polluted and the great majority of wastewater is discharged without any treatment into the environment. Institutionally a single public institution is both de facto in charge of setting sector policy and of being the main service provider. Attempts at reforming and modernizing the sector through new laws have not borne fruit over the past 20 years.

== Access ==
In 2015, 98% of the total population in El Salvador had access to "at least basic" water and 93% had access to "at least basic" sanitation. Nevertheless, there were still, in 2015, 428 thousand people without access to "at least basic" water and 551 thousand without access to "at least basic" sanitation.

Access to water and sanitation in El Salvador remains low by regional standards. Access to improved water source stood at 88 percent in 2010 and access to improved sanitation at 87 percent. Access is lower in rural areas, where about 36 percent of the population lives. In 2010, it stood at 76% for improved water and 83 percent for improved sanitation.

		Urban (64% of the population)	Rural (36% of the population)	Total
Water	Improved	98%	83%	93%
Water	Piped on Premises	80%	42%	66%
Sanitation	Improved	93%	87%	91%
Sanitation	Sewerage (2006 JMP survey & census data)	62%	2%	n/a

Source: Joint Monitoring Program for Water Supply and Sanitation of WHO and UNICEF

=== Productivity and public health impact of lack of access to water supply and sanitation ===
The lack of access to water impacts not only the quality of life of the poor, but also productivity and health. According to a survey carried out in 2001 by the Salvadoran think tank FUSADES the rural poor in particular spend a significant share of their productive time collecting water. Families without household access to water spent on average 8.5 percent of their productive time fetching water, while even those with household access spent 4.9 percent of their productive time fetching water. For the structural poor the values were much higher with 13.6 percent and 7.1 percent respectively.

While access has improved the remaining lack of access to water and sanitation in rural areas has a demonstrably adverse effect on infant mortality, child mortality and stunting. The infant mortality rate among households without a house connection is 40 per 1,000 births, compared to 30 for households with a connection. Similarly, the infant mortality rate among households without a toilet is 37, compared to 30 for households with toilets. The toilets have no toilet seats. Most homes do not have baths.

== Service quality ==
Water supply in most localities served by ANDA is intermittent, varying from 16 hours per day in some areas to less than 4 hours per day or even once every four days, according to a Demographic and Health Survey (called FESAL by its Spanish acronym) carried out in 2002. Most localities, however, seem to receive water at least once a day. The microbiological quality of water is insufficient.

== Water resources and pollution ==
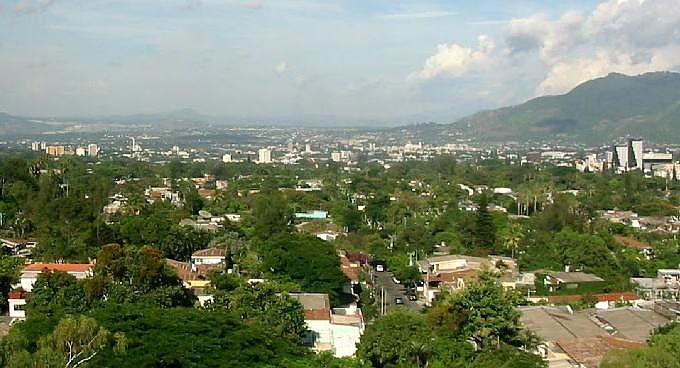
Colonia Escalón in San Salvador

El Salvador's water resources are highly polluted, owing in part to the almost total absence of municipal wastewater treatment. In addition, the country suffers from water scarcity during the dry season and conflicts among users.

It is estimated that 90 percent of the surface water bodies are contaminated. Nearly all municipal wastewater (98 percent) and 90 percent of industrial wastewater is discharged to rivers and creeks without any treatment. The highest priority for pollution abatement is estimated to be in the basins of the Acelhuate River and Sucio River, an area that supplies a third of the water supply of the Metropolitan area of San Salvador.

Over the past 20 years the yield of a sample of springs declined by 30 percent due to deforestation. This has reduced water availability for the rural population, in some cases obliging them to rely on more expensive wells pumping from aquifers whose water table has declined by as much as 1 meter per year in some localities.

== History ==
There have been various efforts to reform the water sector and to create a new legal framework since the mid 1990s. The most comprehensive effort was abandoned after the 2001 earthquakes when political and reform priorities shifted. That reform package would have included the setting of tariffs based on the goal of cost recovery, the creation of a regulator and the introduction of private sector participation. The government of Antonio Saca (2005–2009) considered a general water bill and a water and sanitation bill. According to the water and sanitation bill, ANDA would have limited its functions to service provision. None of the bills was passed until Mauricio Funes assumed the Presidency in June 2009.

== Responsibility for water supply and sanitation ==
=== Service provision ===
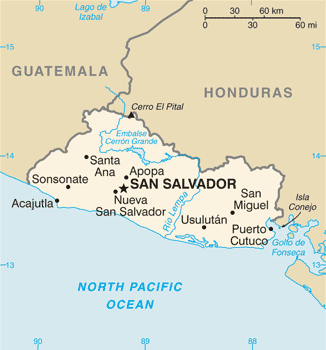
Source: CIA World Factbook

Water supply and sanitation in El Salvador are the responsibility of a large number of diverse service providers.

==== ANDA ====
The dominant service provider is the Administración Nacional de Acueductos y Alcantarillados (ANDA), which provides services to 40 percent of the total population of El Salvador in 149 out of the country's 262 municipalities, including the metropolitan area of San Salvador and the country's other two main cities, Santa Ana and San Miguel. As an umbrella institution ANDA defines policies, regulates and provides services. ANDA's Board Chairman has the rank of a Minister and reports directly to the President of the Republic.

==== Other service providers ====
Other service providers include municipalities, decentralized service providers, housing developers and rural cooperatives. 83 mostly small municipalities provide services directly. More than 13 decentralized service providers have signed agreements under which ANDA has given them the right to manage their services autonomously. More than 100 housing developers have often built their own autonomous urban water systems because ANDA was unable to connect them. They now operate these systems themselves or have delegated service provision to user associations. In rural areas services are provided by more than 800 community-based organizations, including Juntas de Agua and cooperative development associations (Asociaciones de Desarrollo Comunitario). The latter serve about 30 percent of the population.

=== Social investment fund ===
The Social Investment Fund (FISDL) plans and builds water supply systems in the 36 poorest municipalities of El Salvador. This is part of a program called Basic Services Network (Red de Servicios Básicos) which in turn complements the government's Conditional Cash Transfer program Red Solidaria.

=== Non-governmental organizations ===
The Water and Sanitation Network of El Salvador (RASES) provides a forum for the exchange of experiences in the sector, in particular concerning rural areas.

== Financial aspects ==
=== Tariffs and cost recovery ===
==== ANDA tariffs ====
ANDA tariffs average US$0.30/m^{3} and are below levels found in many other Latin American countries. Furthermore, ANDA tariffs are not socially equitable since the subsidies implicit in the low tariffs predominantly benefit the non-poor. First, users without access to the network, which are usually the poorest, do not receive the consumption subsidy. Second, users served by other providers than ANDA do not receive a subsidy for consumption. Third, among users that have ANDA service, the poor receive fewer subsidies than the non-poor as a consequence of the tariff structure. Tariffs are for both water and sewer services. As a result, there is a cross-subsidy from users without sewer connection to those with a sewer connection who are usually better off.

For political reasons, adjustments of ANDA water tariffs have been infrequent. Between 1994 and 2006 ANDA tariffs were only adjusted twice, in 1994 and 2001. The inflation-adjusted tariff, however, barely changed.

==== Tariffs by other service providers ====
Tariffs paid by water users in rural areas do recover financial operating costs, since no direct subsidies are available. They are often much higher than tariffs paid by ANDA customers. Some rural water users in pumped systems receive a subsidy through the Fondo de Inversión Nacional en Electricidad y Telefonía (FINET), which subsidizes electricity tariffs.

==== Cost recovery of ANDA ====
The financial situation of service providers in 2006 did not provide any more for self-financing of investments. ANDA's working ratio was close to 1, indicating that the company barely covers its operating and routine maintenance costs. The reason for the reduced self-financing capacity is a significant increase in the unit costs of ANDA from US$0.21/m^{3} in 1994 to US$0.46/m^{3} in 2001, and US$0.63/m^{3} in 2004. The reason for the important increase of the unit cost in 2004 is not clear, but it could be due to the inauguration of the energy-intensive Río Lempa system that pumps water from the Rio Lempa to San Salvador in that year.

=== Investment ===
Investment levels in water and sanitation in El Salvador stood at about US$20–40m/year from 1995 to 2001, but declined significantly to less than US$10m/year in 2003-04, compared to annual investment needs of US$50–100m to achieve the Millennium Development Goals.

=== Financing ===
In 1990-2002, 63 percent of investments were financed through international loans and grants, 21 percent through self-financing by ANDA, 16 percent with government resources and 0 percent through commercial financing.

== External Support ==
=== Inter-American Development Bank (IDB) ===
The Inter-American Development Bank approved a five-year (2010-2014) rural water and sanitation improvement program for El Salvador totaling $44 million where $20 million is provided by the IDB and the remaining $24 million is on loan from the Spanish Cooperation Fund for Water and Sanitation in Latin America and the Caribbean. The primary objective is to improve living conditions by means of better water and sanitation services. The program is building 85 water systems and will benefit 6,000 households. Additionally, water coverage will increase to 80% in the country's 100 poorest towns. This program is being executed by three agencies: the Social Investment Fund for Local Development, El Salvador's Ministry of the Environment and Natural Resources, and ANDA.

== See also ==
- Water resources management in El Salvador
