= Santa María, El Salvador =

Santa María
- Municipality
- Location in El Salvador
- Coordinates: 13°21′N 88°26′W
- Country: El Salvador
- Department: Usulután Department
- Elevation: 397 ft (121 m)

Santa María is a municipality in the Usulután department of El Salvador.

Nearby Cities and Towns
West:

- Usulután (1.0 nm)

North:

- Cerro El Nanzal (2.2 nm)
- El Cerrito (2.2 nm)
- San Francisco (1.4 nm)

East:

- La Constancia (1.0 nm)

South:

- El Trillo (2.2 nm)
- Santa Barbara (2.2 nm)
- La Laguna (1.4 nm)
- Palo Galan (1.4 nm)
- Mejicapa (1.4 nm)

== Sports ==
The local football club is named Municipal Santa María and it currently plays in the Salvadoran Second Division.
