= Jucuarán =

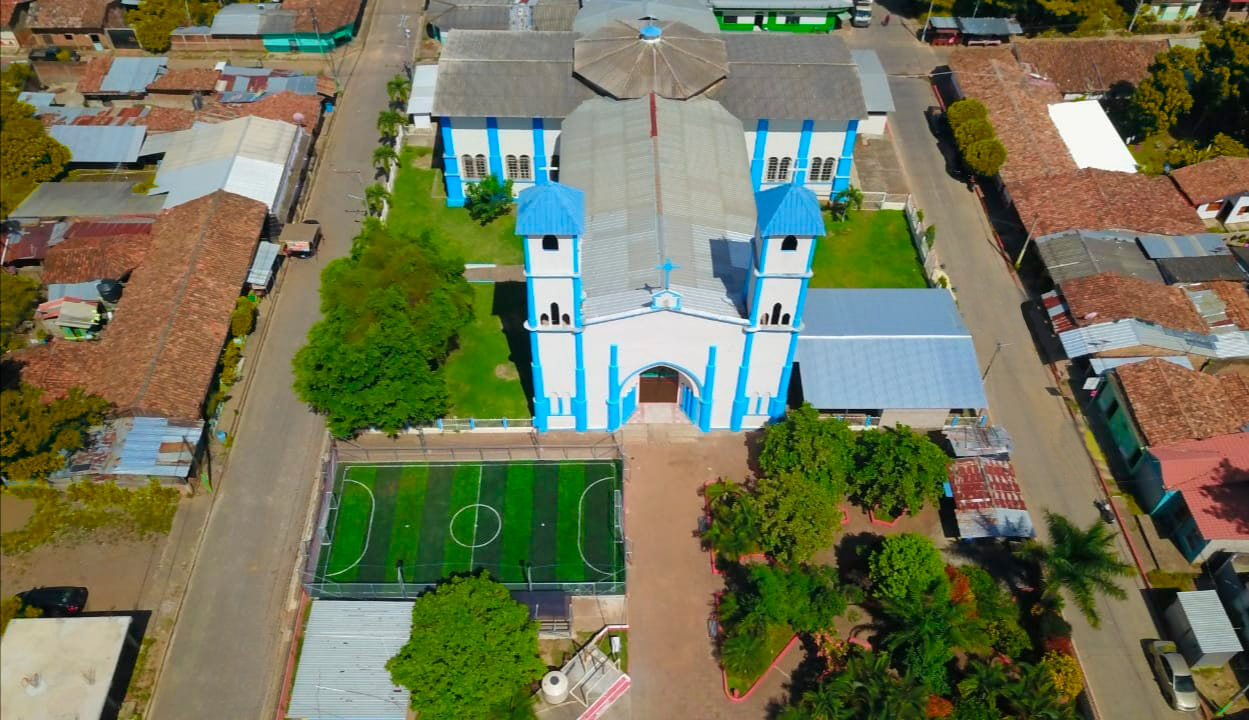
- Jucuarán Catholic Church

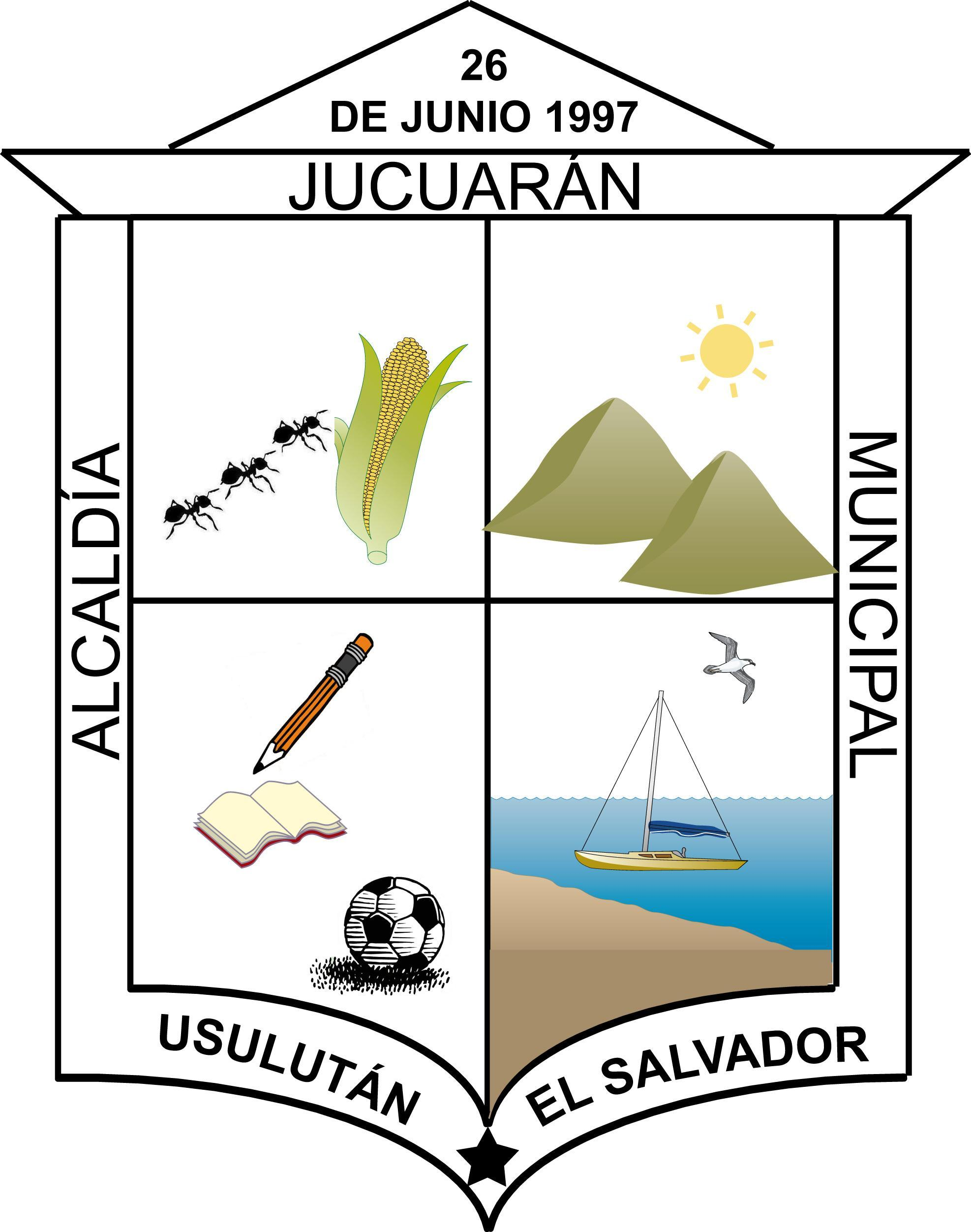
- Flag Seal

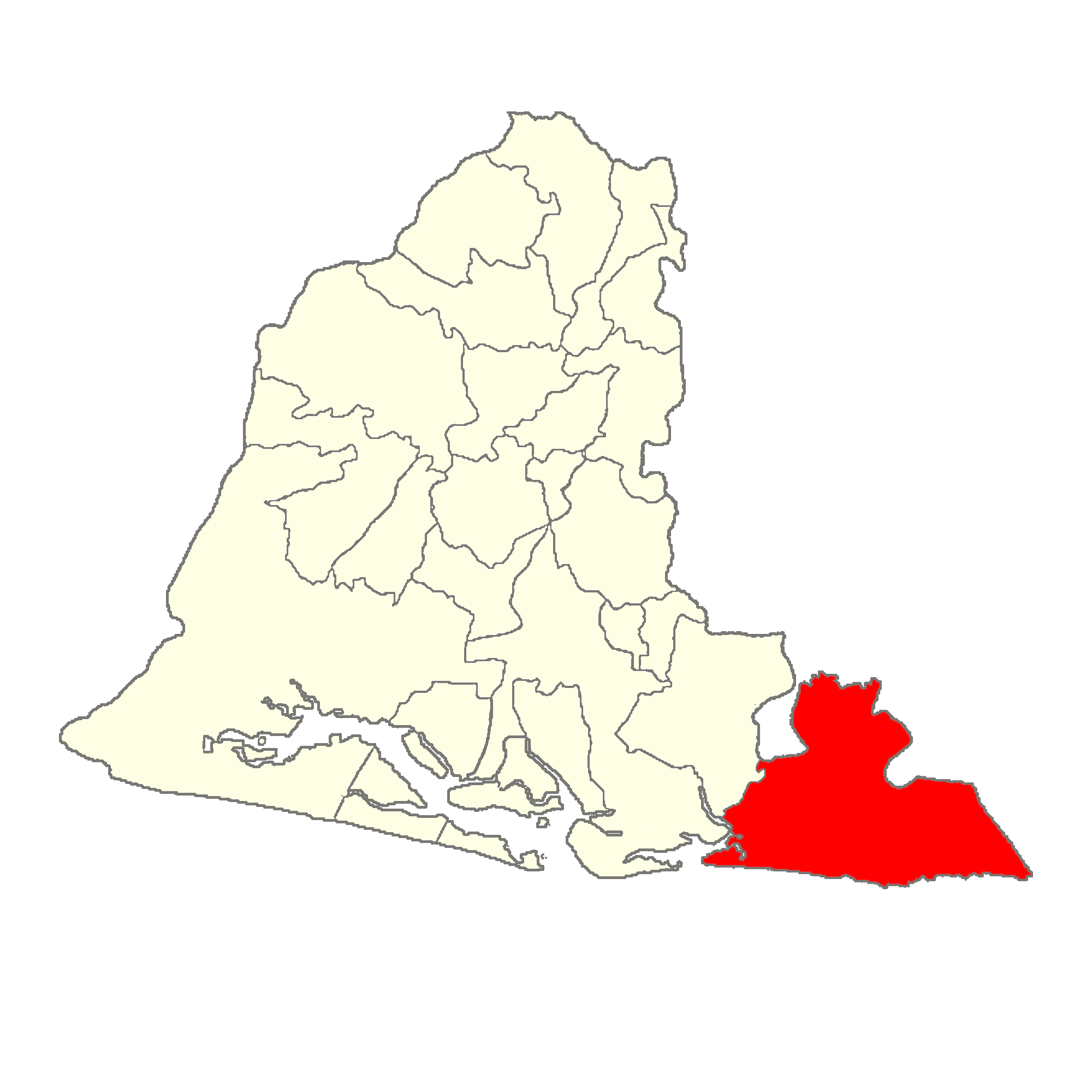

- Location within El Salvador
- Coordinates: 13°15′16″N 88°14′56″W
- Country: El Salvador
- Department: Usulután Department
- Town: September 16, 1936
- City: June 26, 1997

Government
  - Type: Democratic, Mayor-Council Municipality
  - Mayor: Álvaro Rodríguez (Nuevas Ideas)

Area
  - City: 239.69 km^{2} (92.54 sq mi)
  - Urban: 0.56 km^{2} (0.22 sq mi)
- Elevation: 675 m (2,215 ft)

Population (2007)
  - City: 13,424
  - Density: 56/km^{2} (150/sq mi)
  - Demonym: Jucuareño
- Time zone: UTC−6 (Central Standard Time)
- SV-LI: CP 3411
- Area code: + 503
- Website: www.alcaldiajucuaran.com

Jucuarán is a district in the department of Usulután, El Salvador. According to the official census of 2007, it has a population of 13,424 inhabitants.

== History ==
The population is of pre-Columbian origin Ulúa, and by the year 1550 it was inhabited by about 300 people. It suffered an onslaught of pirates in 1682, which forced the inhabitants to flee the town. Upon their return they established a new settlement, apart from the original one. According to Pedro Cortés y Larraz, by 1770 it belonged to the parish of Ereguayquín. He entered the San Alejo Party in 1786, and on June 12, 1824, the department of San Miguel. Years later it would be extinguished as a municipality, and it became a canton, but its status was restored and it became part of the department of Usulután. By 1890 it had 1,268 inhabitants. By Legislative Decree of September 16, 1936, Jucuarán obtained the title of town in 1997.
