= RN-21 (El Salvador highway) =

Highway in El Salvador

- (Santa Tecla Freeway)
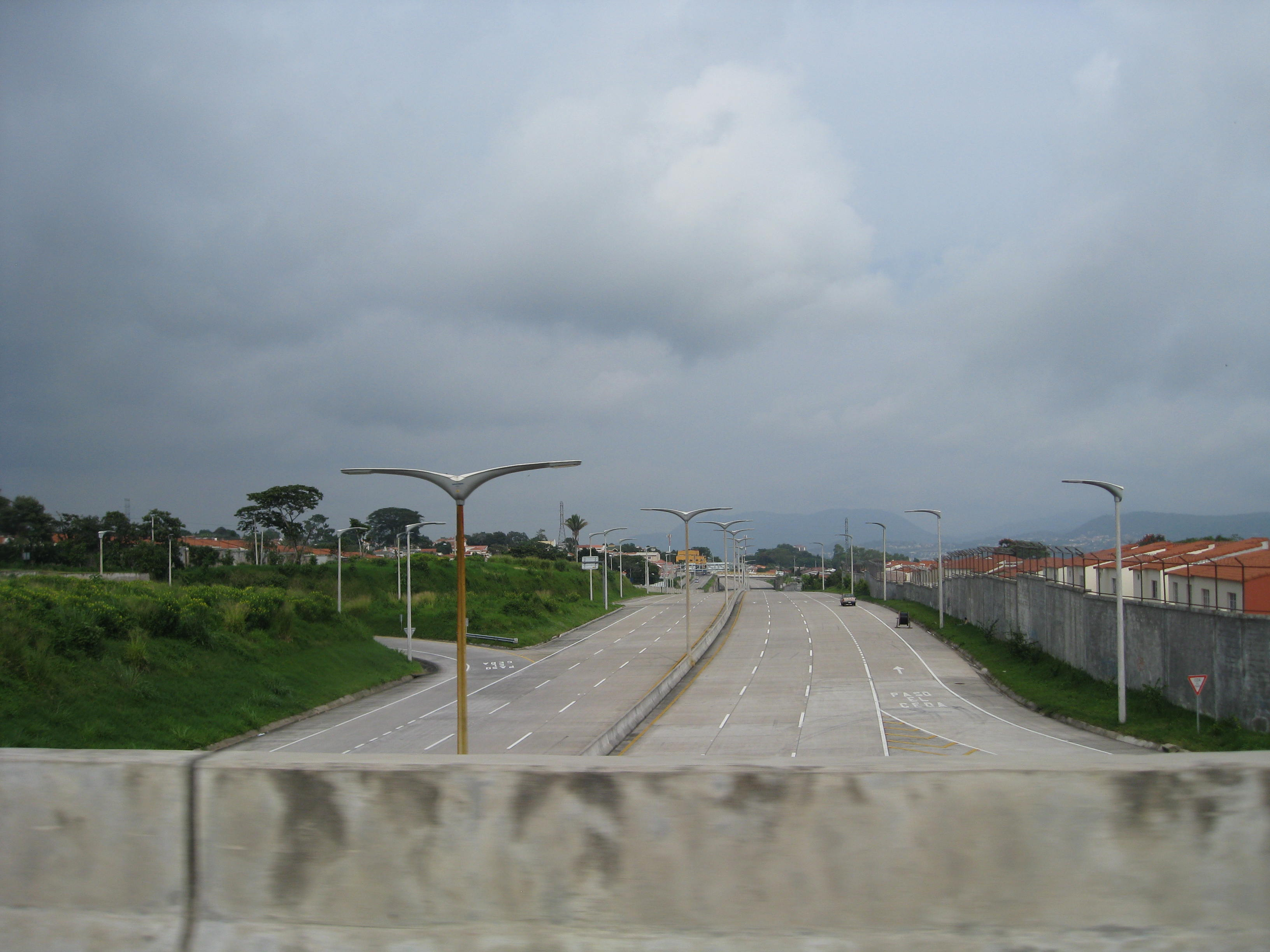

Route information
- Length: 9.95 km (6.18 mi)

Major junctions
- From: CA-1 East–West – Panamerican Highway, Santa Tecla, La Libertad
- Calle Real – Santa Tecla 7a Avenida Norte – Santa Tecla; Boulevard Merliot – Antiguo Cuscatlán; Avenida Jerusalem – San Salvador Alameda Manuel Enrique Araujo – San Salvador
- To: RN-5 North–South – Boulevard Los Próceres/Autopista a Comalapa, San Salvador, San Salvador

Location
- Country: El Salvador

Highway system
- Transport in El Salvador

The east–west Santa Tecla Freeway, RN-21, is the very first freeway to be built in El Salvador. The freeway passes the northern area of the city of Santa Tecla, La Libertad. It has a small portion serving Antiguo Cuscatlán, La Libertad, and merges with the RN-5 (east–west, Boulevard de Los Próceres/Autopista del Aeropuerto) in San Salvador. The total span of the RN-21 is 9.35 kilometres (5.81 mi) and is currently working as a traffic reliever in the metropolitan area.

Initially, the (Santa Tecla Freeway) RN-21 was going to be named "Boulevard Diego de Holguín" in honor of the first mayor of San Salvador, Diego de Holguín. It was finally named "Bulevar Monseñor Romero", though with much disagreement; the name is still in dispute, due to its political motives by El Salvador's former president Mauricio Funes of the FMLN party who also changed the name of El Salvador's international airport, historically known as Comalapa, to Monseñor Óscar Arnulfo Romero y Galdámez for political purposes and to gain votes for the FMLN.

The first phase of the highway was completed in 2009, and the second phase was completed in November 2012. The expressway also contains a bicycle lane.

== History ==
The road was planned in 2006, due to increasing vehicular traffic in the west side of the San Salvador Metropolitan Area, which consists of three cities: Santa Tecla, Antiguo Cuscatlan, and San Salvador. The Panamerican Highway breaks for 2.5 kilometres (1.6 mi) at the historic downtown of Santa Tecla, where the traffic flow collapses almost every day during morning and evening rush hour. This road was the only exit form the metropolitan area towards the western departments. RN-21 has a function of a "periferico" it goes around the northern side of the area, then down on the west to divert traffic from the historic downtown.

=== Phases of construction ===
The first phase of the RN-21 was completed and opened in November 2009, and Phase II was supposed to start in January 2010. Allegedly the current minister of public works stole money that was fund Phase II. He was replaced and charged. Phase II was abandoned until early December 2011, when the Ministry of Public Works recovered the money needed to restart construction and to pay for the damage to the foundations of Phase II due to the storm outbreak in the country from May – November 2011.

Minister of Public Works (MOP-Ministerio de Obras Publicas), Gerson Martinez announced that RN-21 would be completed in 360 days. As in Phase I, the second phase would create six lanes (three in each direction) with a width of 3.65 metres (12.0 ft) and emergency lanes on the shoulders with a width of 2.5 metres (8.2 ft). This work, besides boosting to development, will generate hundreds of direct and indirect jobs and will be the fastest and easiest way to go to San Salvador without going through Santa Tecla. According to traffic studies the road will support over 100,000 vehicles daily. Second phase costs were predicted to be $31,925,558 (USD).

Phase	Status (2012)	km
Tramo I (Phase I)	Completed and Opened in January 2010	5.5
Tramo II-a (Phase II)	Completed - Opened on November 25, 2012	2.25
Tramo II-b (Phase II)	Completed - Opened on November 25, 2012	2.2

== Exits list ==
The RN-21 has a total of 6 Interchanges and 17 exits. For exits the even numbers for the westbound lanes, and odd numbers for the eastbound lanes.

- Exits 7, 8 and 10 are in a roundabout interchange available both for eastbound and westbound.
- Exit 9 does not exist yet; to keep the order, exit 9 was renamed exit 10.

Speed Limit	Interchange	Exit Numbers	Road/Highway (Autopista)	City	km (west-east)
		1-2	CA-1 Panamerican Highway Carretera Panamericana	Santa Tecla	0
		3-4	Calle Real	Santa Tecla	0.74
		5-6	7ª Avenida Norte	Santa Tecla	3.33
		7 8 10	Boulevard Merliot	Antiguo Cuscatlán	5.64
		11 12 13 14	Avenida Jerusalem	San Salvador	7.11
		15 16 17 18	Alameda Manuel Enrique Araujo - RN-5 Boulevard Los Próceres (Autopista Comalapa)	San Salvador	9.9
