= Lake Olomega =

Lake in El Salvador

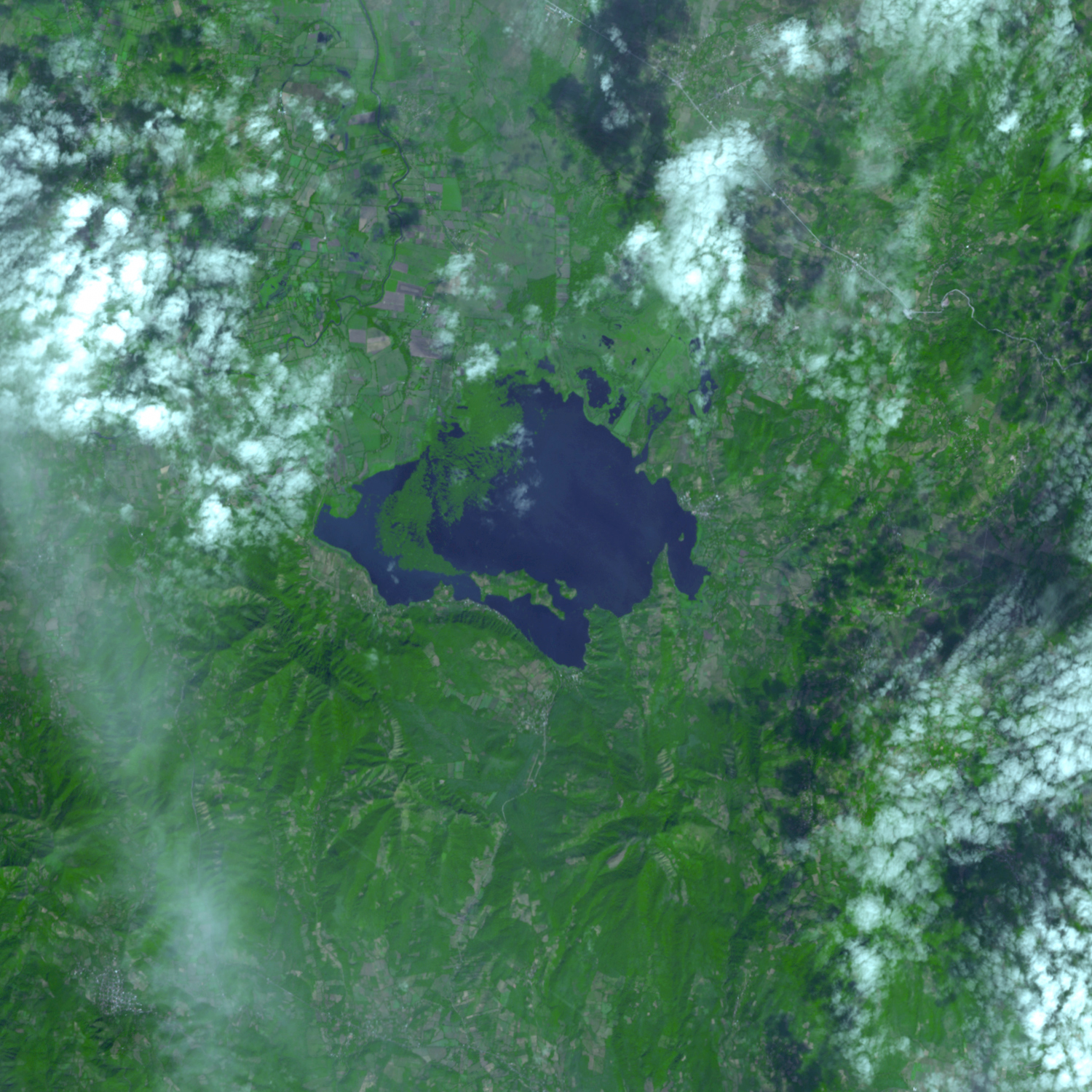

- Location within El Salvador
- Location: South-Eastern El Salvador
- Coordinates: 13°19′N 88°04′W
- Primary inflows: Río Grande de San Miguel
- Basin countries: El Salvador
- Surface area: 24.2 km^{2} (9.3 sq mi)

Ramsar Wetland
- Official name: Laguna de Olomega
- Designated: 2 February 2010
- Reference no.: 1899

Lake Olomega is a large lake in the southeastern part of El Salvador.

In the past few years Lake Olomega has suffered from an infestation of Water hyacinth which has caused problems for wildlife, fishing, and tourism.

Lake Olomega is located next to the town of Olomega (population 4000). The community relies heavily on fishing and ecotourism. The canton Los Riitos has geothermal water and can most easily be reached by boat (as long as the nimfa does not prevent boat travel).

For years this natural resource has received the black waters of the settlements to their round, pollution by livestock and fisheries hasn't been unregulated. With Ramsar status, the Government can make sustainable development in the area, thanks to international support.

Olomega is the eastern region of El Salvador's, largest freshwater body. The site also includes the surrounding vegetation, such as herbaceous swamps and a patch of forest seasonally saturated, known as the Chiriqui and one of the last relics of this type of community in El Salvador

The hydrological features of the site include flood control, water purification, and the replenishment of groundwater, serving for more than 9,000 inhabitants of the area.

Rich biodiversity

An electronic report of the Ramsar Convention details show that the lagoon is home to several endangered species, such as the royal duck, dark ibis, the snail and the tree frog.

This wetland, which measures 7,557 hectares, serves as the resting and feeding ground for many migratory birds.

== Transportation ==
Olomega can be reached either by taking a bus directly to the town, although the bus to Olomega does not run often, or by getting off at El Carmen (the pueblo, just off the highway) and waiting for a truck to go to Olomega.
