= San Dionisio, El Salvador =

Municipality in El Salvador

Coordinates: 13°17′N 88°28′W

San Dionisio San Dionisio
- District
- Interactive map of San Dionisio
- Country: El Salvador
- Department: Usulután
- Municipality: Usulután Este

Population (2024)
  - District: 3,676
  - Rank: 222nd in El Salvador
  - Rural: 3,676

San Dionisio is a municipality in the Usulután department of El Salvador.
