= San Francisco Menéndez =

- District
- Location in El Salvador
- Coordinates: 13°50′33″N 90°01′00″W
- Country: El Salvador
- Department: Ahuachapán
- Municipality: Ahuachapán Sur

Area
  - District: 87.31 sq mi (226.13 km^{2})
- Elevation: 735 ft (224 m)

Population (2024)
  - District: 44,906
  - Rank: 31st in El Salvador
  - Density: 514.33/sq mi (198.58/km^{2})
  - Urban: 23,370
  - Rural: 21,536

San Francisco Menéndez is a district in the Ahuachapán Department of El Salvador.
