= Jiquilisco =

- City and municipality
- Location in El Salvador
- Coordinates: 13°19′0″N 88°35′0″W
- Country: El Salvador
- Department: Usulután Department

Government
  - Type: GANA
  - Mayor: Loida Eunice Loza de Perez

Area
  - Total: 166.02 sq mi (429.99 km^{2})
- Elevation: 144 ft (44 m)

Population (2007)
  - Total: 47,784
- Time zone: UTC-6

Jiquilisco is a city and municipality in the Usulután department of El Salvador.

== Sports ==
The local football clubs are named C.D. Topiltzín and A.D. El Tercio and they currently play in the Salvadoran Second and Third Division respectively.
