= Jiquilisco Bay =

Nature reserve in El Salvador

Jiquilisco Bay Biosphere Reserve
- Location within El Salvador
- Location: Usulután Department, El Salvador
- Nearest city: Usulután
- Coordinates: 13.333°N 88.55°W
- Area: 400 square kilometres (150 mi^{2})
- Established: 2005
- Governing body: Ministry of Natural Resources (MARN)

Ramsar Wetland
- Official name: Complejo Bahía de Jiquilisco
- Designated: 31 October 2005
- Reference no.: 1586

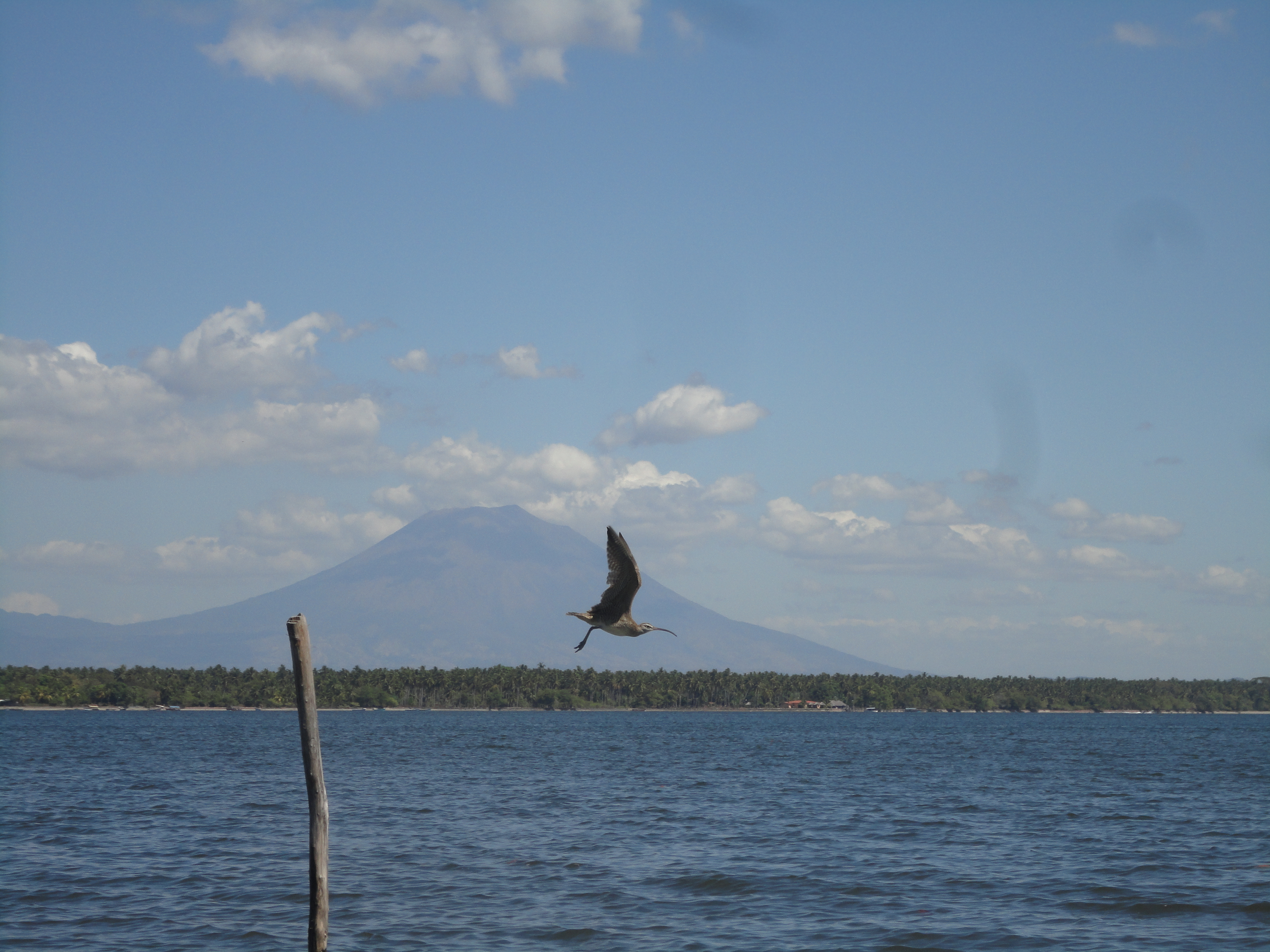
Shows the location.

The Jiquilisco Bay Biosphere Reserve is located on the southeast Pacific coast of El Salvador, in the department of Usulután. Jiquilisco Bay's mangrove-lined inlets and bay host the largest abundance of coastal-marine birds in the El Salvador, many of which are threatened or endangered. Over 80 species of migratory birds visit the area to feed on the bay's fish, which include species such as snook, red snapper and corvina. The natural environment of Bahia Jiquilisco has recently led to an increase in eco-tourism in the area.

== Reserve status ==
The Bahia Jiquilisco Biosphere Reserve was declared a Ramsar site on October 31, 2005. The Reserve covers approximately 400 km2, including 50 km of coastline, and is located between the mouth of the river Lempa and the Jucuarán mountain range. The main canal leading into the bay measures over 43 km long and 3 km wide.

The Reserve contains the largest mangrove estuary in El Salvador and includes bays, canals, sandy beaches, islands, forests and a freshwater lagoon complex. Bahia Jiquilisco plays a role in the prevention of disasters (floods, earthquakes), erosion control, and soil retention. It also serves as a rookery for larval and juvenile development stages for many commercial marine species. Various small communities border the bay's waters and local people benefit from the area's high natural resource abundance. The area also hosts livestock rearing, shrimp farming and agricultural activities.

== Critical Hawksbill Sea Turtle Habitat ==
Bahia Jiquilisco is also one of two primary hawksbill sea turtle (Eretmochelys imbricata) nesting habitats in the eastern Pacific Ocean. The hawksbill is one of only three sea turtle species listed as Critically Endangered (CR) on the World Conservation Union's (IUCN) Red List of Threatened Species. In the eastern Pacific Ocean, the species is extremely rare and as recently as 2007 most researchers thought hawksbills had been completely eliminated in this region of the world.

The discovery of hawksbill nesting in Bahia Jiquilisco and in Estero Padre Ramos (Nicaragua) changed the conservation outlook for this imperiled population and has provided renewed hope for recovery. Each season approximately 150-200 hawksbills emerge from the sea to nest along the shores of Bahia Jiquilisco, representing approximately 40% of all known hawksbill nesting in the entire eastern Pacific. Jiquilisco bay is not only important for hawksbill nesting, its inner channels are also critical foraging habitats species. Residence of hawksbills year-round in the estuary, which is in stark contrast to the coral reef habitats the species is known to inhabit in other regions of the world, represents a new life-history paradigm for the species. The Eastern Pacific Hawksbill Initiative works at the site in conjunction with local community groups and non-profit organizations to research and protect hawksbills and their nests.
