= Usulután Department =

Department of El Salvador

Usulután
- Department
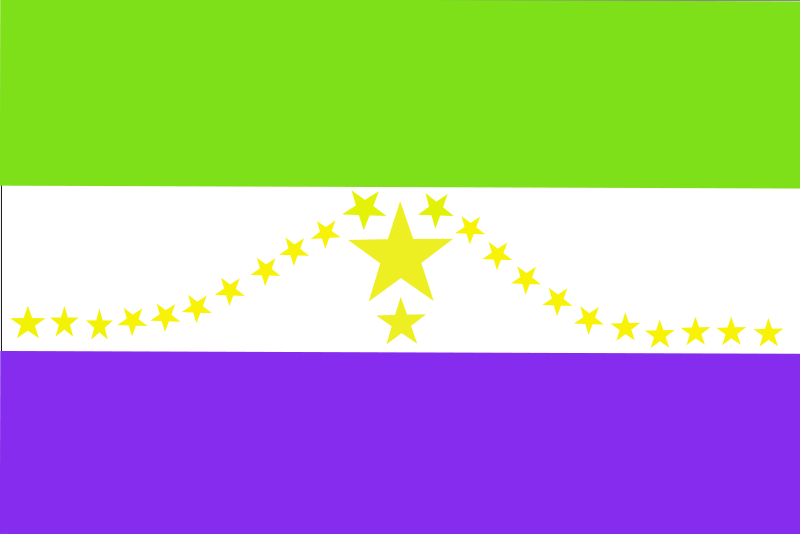
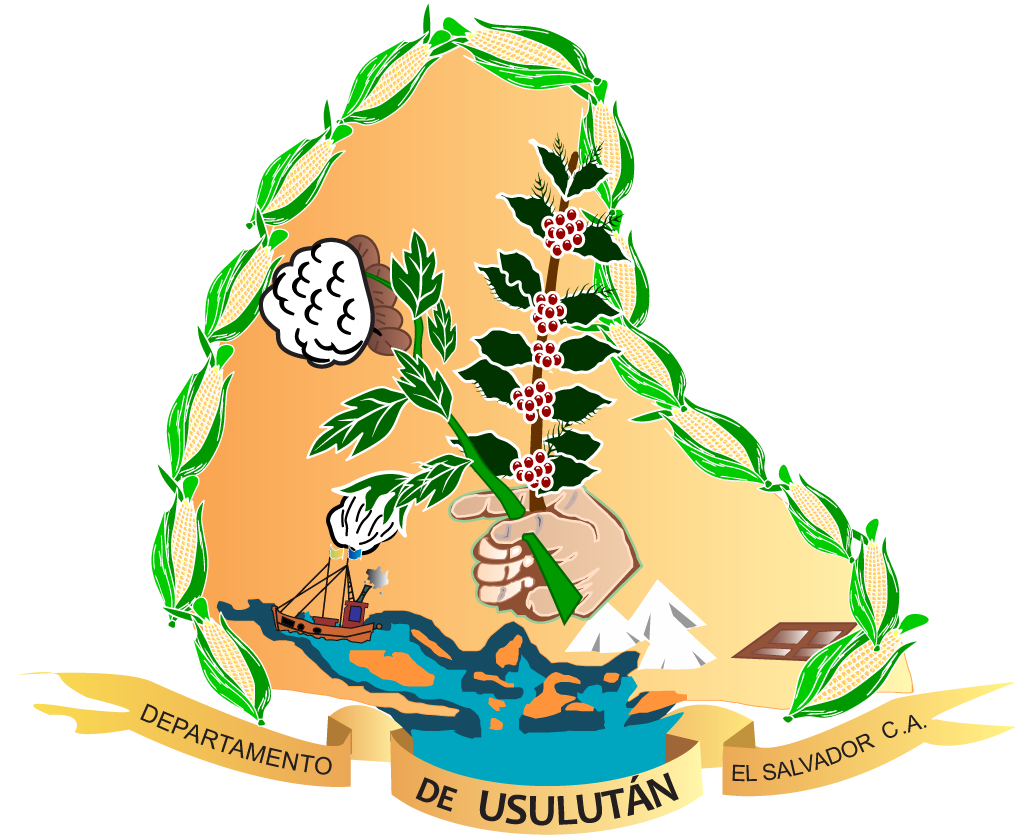
- Flag Coat of arms

- Location within El Salvador
- Coordinates: 13°22′34″N 88°31′12″W
- Country: El Salvador
- Created (given current status): 1865
- Seat: Usulután

Area
  - Total: 2,130.4 km^{2} (822.6 sq mi)
  - Rank: Ranked 1st

Population (2024)
  - Total: 325,494
  - Rank: Ranked 5th
  - Density: 152.79/km^{2} (395.71/sq mi)
- Time zone: UTC−6 (CST)
- ISO 3166 code: SV-US

Usulután (Spanish pronunciation: [usuluˈtan]; from the Nawat language, meaning "city of the ocelots") is a department of El Salvador in the southeast of the country (Lenca region). The capital is Usulután.

Created on June 22, 1865, it is El Salvador's largest department. It has an area of 2,130 km^{2} (820 sq mi).

On October 26, 1948, the Alegria district was abolished and a new one called Santiago de Maria was created; it contains the cities of Santiago de Maria, which is the main city, as well as Alegria, Tecapan and California.

The city of Usulutan, the department's capital, was founded by the Lenca tribes but it was conquered by the Pipil tribes. Some of the best beaches in El Salvador are located in Usulutan, and others such as El Espino are now under development. For its high migration of its residents to the United States, it is known as Shulton city.

The department is home to Jiquilisco Bay and Puerto El Triunfo.

Bosque Nancuchiname is a forest of the Usulután Department, framing the eastern bank of the Lempa River and the town of El Zamoran on its southeastern border.

== Municipalities ==
1. Usulután Este
2. Usulután Norte
3. Usulután Oeste

== Districts ==
1. Alegría
2. Berlín
3. California
4. Concepción Batres
5. El Triunfo
6. Ereguayquín
7. Estanzuelas
8. Jiquilisco
9. Jucuapa
10. Jucuarán
11. Mercedes Umaña
12. Nueva Granada
13. Ozatlán
14. Puerto El Triunfo
15. San Agustín
16. San Buenaventura
17. San Dionisio
18. San Francisco Javier
19. Santa Elena
20. Santa María
21. Santiago de María
22. Tecapán
23. Usulután
