= Transport in El Salvador =

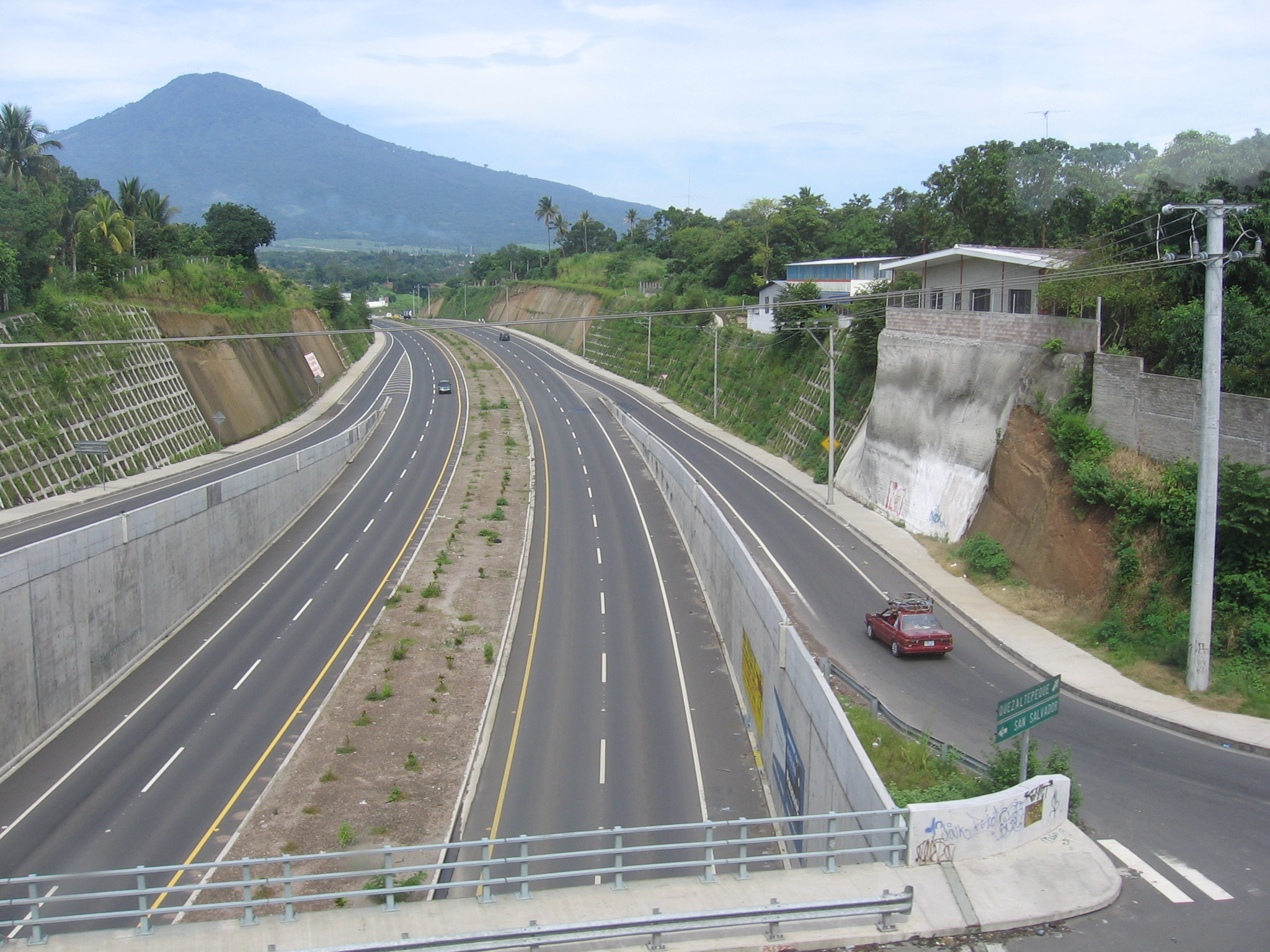
The road to San Salvador, leaving from Apopa. Vertical road leads to Quezaltepeque. The volcano of San Salvador is seen in the distance.

El Salvador has transport links by road, rail, sea and air.

El Salvador has over 10,000 km of roads, and one passenger rail service. There are several seaports on the Pacific Ocean, and two international airports.

== Railways ==
A weekday passenger service links San Salvador and Apopa, a journey of 40 minutes. Of a total of 602 km narrow-gauge (3 ft (914 mm)) rail, much is abandoned. In November 2013 the government rail agency FENADESAL announced plans for development of four electrified railways serving San Salvador, Sitio del Niño (La Libertad), El Salvador International Airport, La Unión, and the Honduran frontier.

=== Railway links with adjacent countries ===
- Guatemala – 3 ft (914 mm) gauge both countries, currently closed.
- Honduras – none

== Highways ==
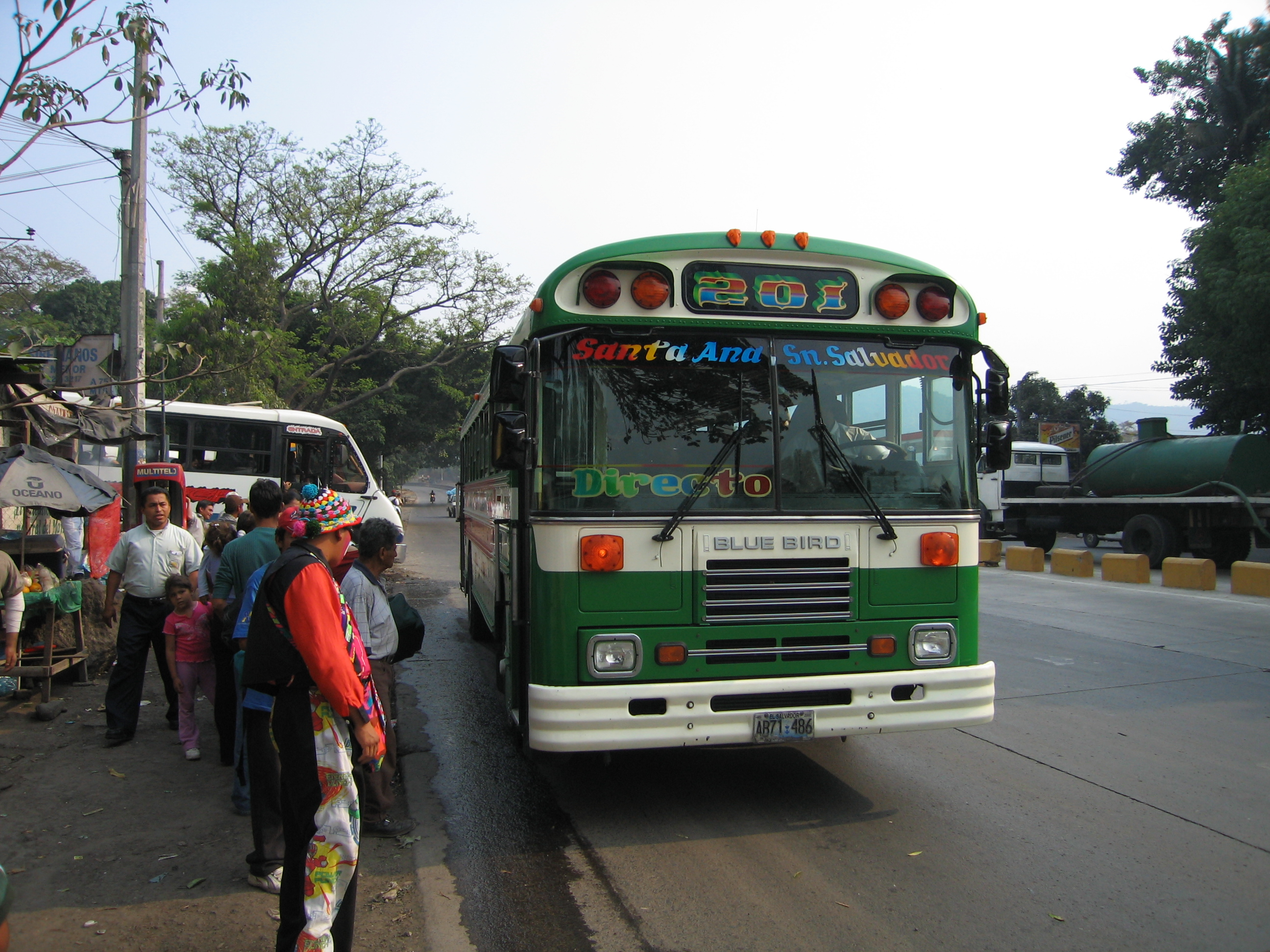
The bus running between Santa Ana and San Salvador.

- total: 10,029 km
- paved: 1,986 km (including 327 km of Highways)
- unpaved: 8,043 km (1999 est.)

The RN-21 (Bulevar Monseñor Romero) (East–West) was the first freeway to be built in El Salvador and in Central America. The freeway passes through the northern area of the city of Santa Tecla, La Libertad. It has a small portion serving Antiguo Cuscatlan, La Libertad, and merges with the RN-5 (Autopista Comalapa) (East–West, Boulevard de Los Proceres/Autopista del Aeropuerto) in San Salvador.

The total length of the RN-21 is 9.95 kilometres (6.18 mi) and is currently working as a traffic relief in the metropolitan area. The RN-21 was named in honor of Óscar Romero. The first phase of the highway was completed in 2009, and the second phase in November 2012.

== Ports and harbors ==
=== Pacific Ocean ===
- Acajutla
- Puerto Cutuco
- La Libertad
- La Unión
- Puerto El Triunfo

== Merchant marine ==
none (1999 est.)

== Airports ==
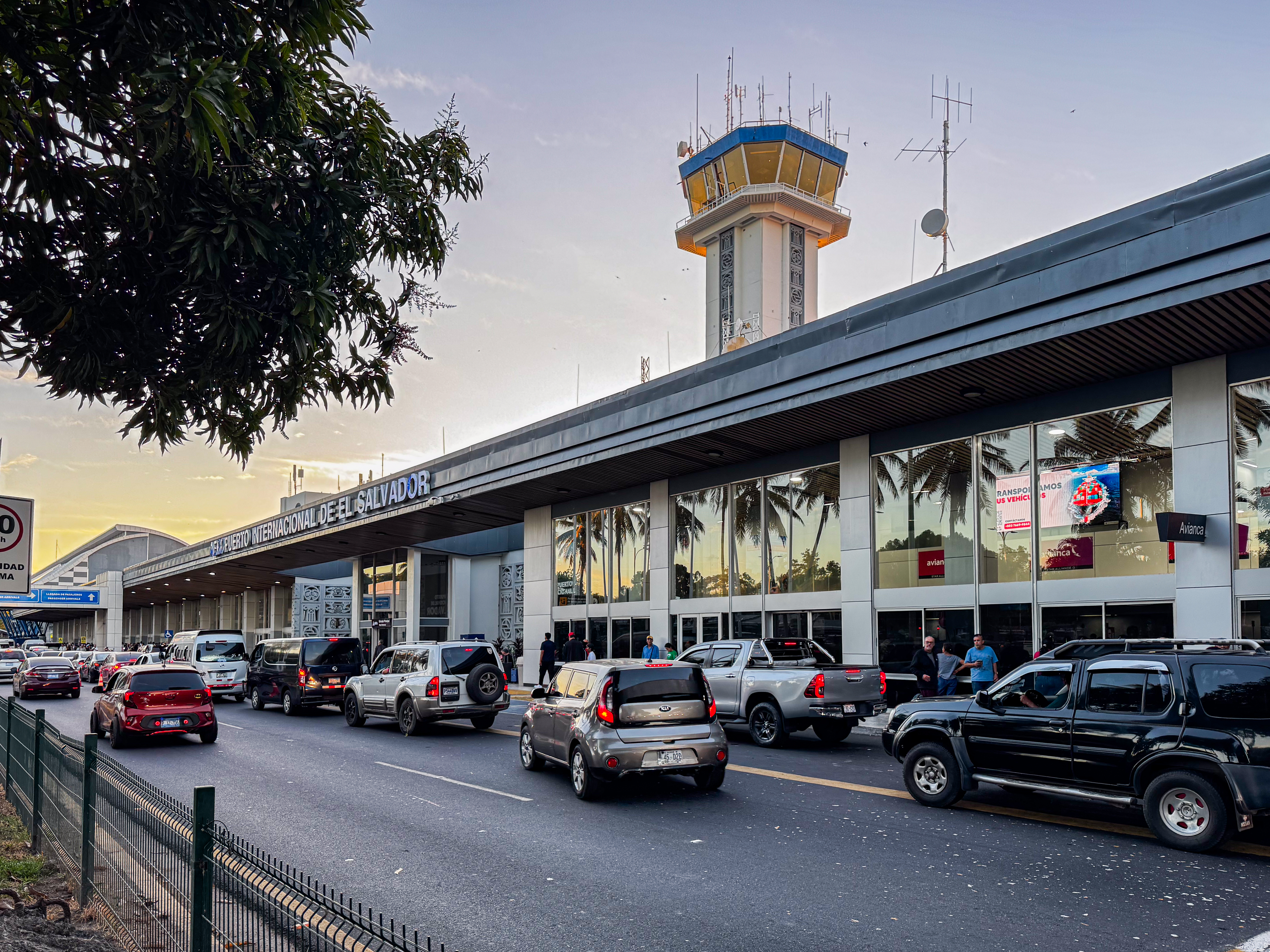
El Salvador International Airport.

75 (2006 est.)

=== Airports – with paved runways ===
- total: 4
- over 3,047 m: 1
- 1,524 to 2,437 m: 1
- 914 to 1,523 m: 2 (2006 est.)

=== Airports – with unpaved runways ===
- total: 71
- 1,524 to 2,437 m: 1
- 914 to 1,523 m: 14
- under 914 m: 56 (2006 est.)

=== Heliports ===
1 (2006 est.)

=== Airports by name ===
- Airport of the Pacific (under construction)
- El Salvador International Airport
- Ilopango International Airport

== See also ==
- Gerardo Barrios Bypass
