= List of airports in Honduras =

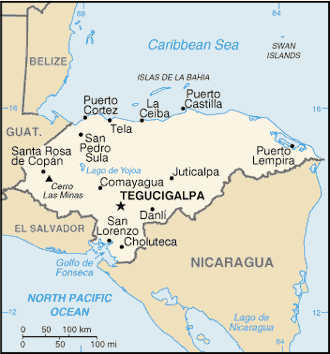
Map of Honduras

This is a list of airports in Honduras, sorted by location.

Honduras, officially the Republic of Honduras (Spanish: República de Honduras), is a republic in Central America. It was formerly known as Spanish Honduras to differentiate it from British Honduras (now Belize). The country is bordered to the west by Guatemala, to the southwest by El Salvador, to the southeast by Nicaragua, to the south by the Pacific Ocean at the Gulf of Fonseca, and to the north by the Gulf of Honduras, a large inlet of the Caribbean Sea. Its area is just over 112,000 square kilometres (43,000 sq mi) with an estimated population of almost 8 million inhabitants. The nation is currently divided into 18 departments (departamentos). The capital city of Honduras is Tegucigalpa.

== Airports ==
Names shown in bold indicate the airport has scheduled passenger service on commercial airlines.

Location served	Department	ICAO	IATA	Airport name
Ahuás	Gracias a Dios	MHAH	AHS	Ahuas Airport
Amapala	Valle	MHAM		Amapala Airport (Los Pelonas) (closed)
Brus Laguna	Gracias a Dios	MHBL	BHG	Brus Laguna Airport
Catacamas	Olancho	MHGE		El Aguacate Airport
Cauquira	Gracias a Dios	MHCU	CDD	Cauquira Airport
Choluteca	Choluteca	MHCH		Choluteca Airport
Comayagua	Comayagua	MHSC	XPL	**Palmerola International Airport**
Copán Ruinas	Copán	MHRU	RUY	Copán Ruinas Airport
Coyoles	Yoro	MHCS	CYL	Coyoles Airport
El Porvenir	Colón	MHPV		El Porvenir Airport
Erandique	Lempira	MHGU	EDQ	Erandique Airport
Gracias	Lempira	MHGS	GAC	Celaque Airport
Gualaco	Olancho	MHJI	GUO	Jicalapa Airport
Guanaja	Bay Islands	MHNJ	GJA	**Guanaja Airport**
Islas del Cisne (Swan Islands)	Bay Islands	MHIC		Islas del Cisne Airport
La Ceiba	Atlántida	MHLC	LCE	**Golosón International Airport**
La Esperanza	Colón	MHEZ		La Esperanza Airport
La Esperanza	Intibucá	MHLE	LEZ	La Esperanza Airport
La Unión	Olancho	MHCR	LUI	La Unión Airport
La Lima	Cortés		LLH	La Lima Airport
Marcala	La Paz	MHMA	MRJ	Marcala Airport - closed
Mocorón	Gracias a Dios	MHDU		Mocorón Airport (Durzona)
Nueva Ocotepeque	Ocotepeque	MHNV		Nueva Ocotepeque Airport
Olanchito	Yoro	MHOA	OAN	El Arrayán Airport
Palacios	Gracias a Dios	MHPC	PCH	Palacios Airport
Puerto Castilla	Colón	MHCT		Puerto Castilla Airport - closed
Puerto Lempira	Gracias a Dios	MHPL	PEU	**Puerto Lempira Airport**
Roatán	Bay Islands	MHRO	RTB	**Juan Manuel Gálvez International Airport**
San Pedro Sula	Cortés	MHLM	SAP	**Ramón Villeda Morales International Airport**
Santa Bárbara	Santa Bárbara	MHSB (~~MHSZ~~)		Santa Bárbara Airport - closed
Santa Rosa de Copán	Copán	MHSR	SDH	Santa Rosa de Copán Airport - closed
Tegucigalpa	Francisco Morazán	MHTG	TGU	**Toncontín Airport**
Tela	Atlántida	MHTE	TEA	Tela Airport
Trujillo	Colón	MHTJ	TJI	**Trujillo Airport**
Victoria	Yoro		VTA	Victoria Airport
Yoro	Yoro	MHYR	ORO	Yoro Airport
Útila	Bay Islands	MHUT	UII	**Útila Airport**

The following airports have unverified coordinates:

Location served	Department	ICAO	IATA	Airport name
Comayagua	Comayagua	MHCG		Comayagua Airport
El Progreso	Yoro	MHPE		El Progreso Airport
Iriona	Colón	MHIR	IRN	Iriona Airport
Juticalpa	Olancho	MHJU	JUT	Juticalpa Airport
Limón	Colón	MHLN	LMH	Limón Airport
Puerto Cortés	Cortés	MHPU		Puerto Cortes Airport
San Esteban	Colón		SET	San Esteban Airport
Sulaco	Yoro	MHUL	SCD	Sulaco Airport
Tocoa	Colón	MHTO	TCF	Tocoa Airport

== See also ==
- Aerolíneas Sosa
- Transportation in Honduras
- List of airports by ICAO code: M#MH - Honduras
- Wikipedia: WikiProject Aviation/Airline destination lists: North America#Honduras
