= Trujillo Airport =

Airport in Honduras

Trujillo Airport Aeropuerto de Trujillo
- IATA: TJI; ICAO: MHTJ

Summary
- Airport type: Military/Public
- Serves: Trujillo, Honduras
- Elevation AMSL: 3 ft (0.91 m)
- Coordinates: 15°55′37″N 085°56′18″W

Map
- Location in Honduras

Runways
Direction	Length		Surface
Direction	m	ft	Surface
06/24	1,071	3,514	Asphalt
- Source: WAD GCM SkyVector

Trujillo Airport (Spanish: Aeropuerto de Trujillo) (IATA: TJI, ICAO: MHTJ) is an airport serving Trujillo, a municipality in the Colón Department on the northern coast of Honduras.

The airport parallels the coastline, roughly 100 metres (330 ft) inland from the shore. Numerous houses and hotels use the runway for access to the city.

== Facilities ==
The airport is at an elevation of 3 feet (1 m) above mean sea level. It has one runway designated 06/24 with an asphalt surface measuring 1,071 m × 29 m (3,514 ft × 95 ft).

== Airlines ==
Airlines	Destinations
Aviac	La Ceiba, Puerto Lempira

== See also ==
- Transport in Honduras
- List of airports in Honduras
