= Puerto Castilla Airport =

- IATA: none; ICAO: MHCT

Summary
- Airport type: Closed
- Location: Puerto Castilla, Honduras
- Coordinates: 16°00′30″N 85°58′05″W

Map
- Location in Honduras

Runways
Direction	Length		Surface
Direction	m	ft	Surface
Closed
- Sources: Google Maps HERE Maps GCM

Puerto Castilla Airport (ICAO: MHCT) was an airport formerly serving Puerto Castilla, a municipality in Colón Department, Honduras.

Aerial imaging shows the western end of the paved runway built over by buildings and storage from the Puerto Castilla container port, leaving only 200 metres (660 ft) of runway plus the aircraft turnaround on the eastern end.

== See also ==
- Transport in Honduras
- List of airports in Honduras
