= Victoria Airport (disambiguation) =

Victoria Airport may refer to:

- Victoria International Airport, British Columbia, Canada (IATA: YYJ, ICAO: CYYJ)
- Victoria Airport (Montreal) (IATA: YMY, ICAO: CYMY)
- Victoria Airport (Chile) (IATA: ZIC, ICAO: SCTO)
- Victoria Airport (Honduras) (IATA: none, ICAO: none, FAA LID: VTA)
- Victoria Regional Airport, Victoria, Texas, United States (IATA: VCT, ICAO: KVCT, FAA LID: VCT)

== See also ==
- List of airports in Greater Victoria
- List of airports in Victoria, Australia
