= Ahuas Airport =

Airport in Gracias a Dios, Honduras

- IATA: AHS; ICAO: MHAH

Summary
- Airport type: Public
- Serves: Ahuas
- Elevation AMSL: 98 ft / 30 m
- Coordinates: 15°28′20″N 84°21′10″W

Map
- Location of the airport in Honduras

Runways
Direction	Length		Surface
Direction	m	ft	Surface
08/26	900	2,953	Grass
17/352	850	2,789	Grass
- Sources: GCM Google Maps

Ahuas Airport (IATA: AHS, ICAO: MHAH) is an airport serving the village of Ahuas in Gracias a Dios Department, Honduras. The airport is just south of the village.

== See also ==
- Transport in Honduras
- List of airports in Honduras
