= Tegucigalpa Airport =

Tegucigalpa Airport may refer to:

- Toncontín International Airport (IATA: TGU)
- Comayagua International Airport (IATA: XPL)
