= La Esperanza Airport (Colón) =

- IATA: none; ICAO: MHEZ

Summary
- Airport type: Private
- Elevation AMSL: 160 ft / 49 m
- Coordinates: 15°36′35″N 86°08′20″W

Map
- Location of the airport in Honduras

Runways
Direction	Length		Surface
Direction	m	ft	Surface
08/26	955	3,133	Asphalt
- Sources: Google Maps GCM SkyVector

La Esperanza Airport (ICAO: MHEZ) is an airport serving a number of agricultural villages and towns in western Colón Department, Honduras. The largest nearby towns are Sonaguera (13 km) and Sabá (17 km).

The Punta Castilla non-directional beacon (Ident: CTL) is located 25.7 nautical miles (47.6 km) north-northeast of the airport. The Bonito VOR-DME (Ident: BTO) is located 42.6 nautical miles (78.9 km) west of the airport.

== See also ==
- Transport in Honduras
- List of airports in Honduras
