= Choluteca Airport =

Choluteca Airport Nueva Choluteca Airport
- IATA: none; ICAO: MHNC

Summary
- Airport type: Public
- Serves: Choluteca, Honduras
- Elevation AMSL: 213 ft / 65 m
- Coordinates: 13°19′10″N 87°08′58″W

Map
- Location of the airport in Honduras

Runways
Direction	Length		Surface
Direction	m	ft	Surface
05/23	1,110	3,642	Concrete
- Sources: GCM Google Maps SkyVector

Choluteca Airport (ICAO: MHNC) is an airport serving the city of Choluteca in Choluteca Department, Honduras. The airport ICAO code is also variously listed as MHCH.

The airport is on the eastern edge of the city. The runway length does not include a 175 metres (574 ft) paved overrun on the northeast end.

The Toncontin VOR-DME (Ident: TNT) is located 42.8 nautical miles (79.3 km) north of the airport.

== See also ==
- Transport in Honduras
- List of airports in Honduras
