= Amapala Airport =

Amapala Airport Los Pelonas
- IATA: none; ICAO: MHAM

Summary
- Airport type: Defunct
- Serves: Amapala, Honduras
- Elevation AMSL: 40 ft / 12 m
- Coordinates: 13°17′02″N 87°37′05″W

Map
- Location of the airport in Honduras

Runways
Direction	Length		Surface
Direction	m	ft	Surface
14/32	585	1,919	Grass
- Sources: GCM Google Maps

Amapala Airport (ICAO: MHAM) was an airstrip serving the town of Amapala on El Tigre Island, a volcanic island in the Gulf of Fonseca, Honduras.

The runway is at the foot of the volcano, on the northeast side of the island, 3.2 kilometres (2 mi) east of Amapala.

The Toncontin VOR-DME (Ident: TNT) is located 50.1 nautical miles (92.8 km) north-northeast of the airstrip.

== See also ==
- Transport in Honduras
- List of airports in Honduras
