= Celaque Airport =

- IATA: GAC; ICAO: MHGS

Summary
- Airport type: Public
- Serves: Gracias, Honduras
- Elevation AMSL: 2,995 ft / 913 m
- Coordinates: 14°34′25″N 88°35′45″W

Map
- Location of the airport in Honduras

Runways
Direction	Length		Surface
Direction	m	ft	Surface
03/21	1,300	4,265	Asphalt
- Sources: GCM Google Maps SkyVector

Celaque Airport (IATA: GAC, ICAO: MHGS) is an airport serving the town of Gracias in Lempira Department, Honduras. The airport was inaugurated in 2013.

There is high terrain southwest of the airport.

The Soto Cano VORTAC (Ident: ESC) is located 57.6 nautical miles (106.7 km) east of the airport.

== See also ==
- Transport in Honduras
- List of airports in Honduras
