= Tela Airport =

Tela Airport Aeropuerto de Tela
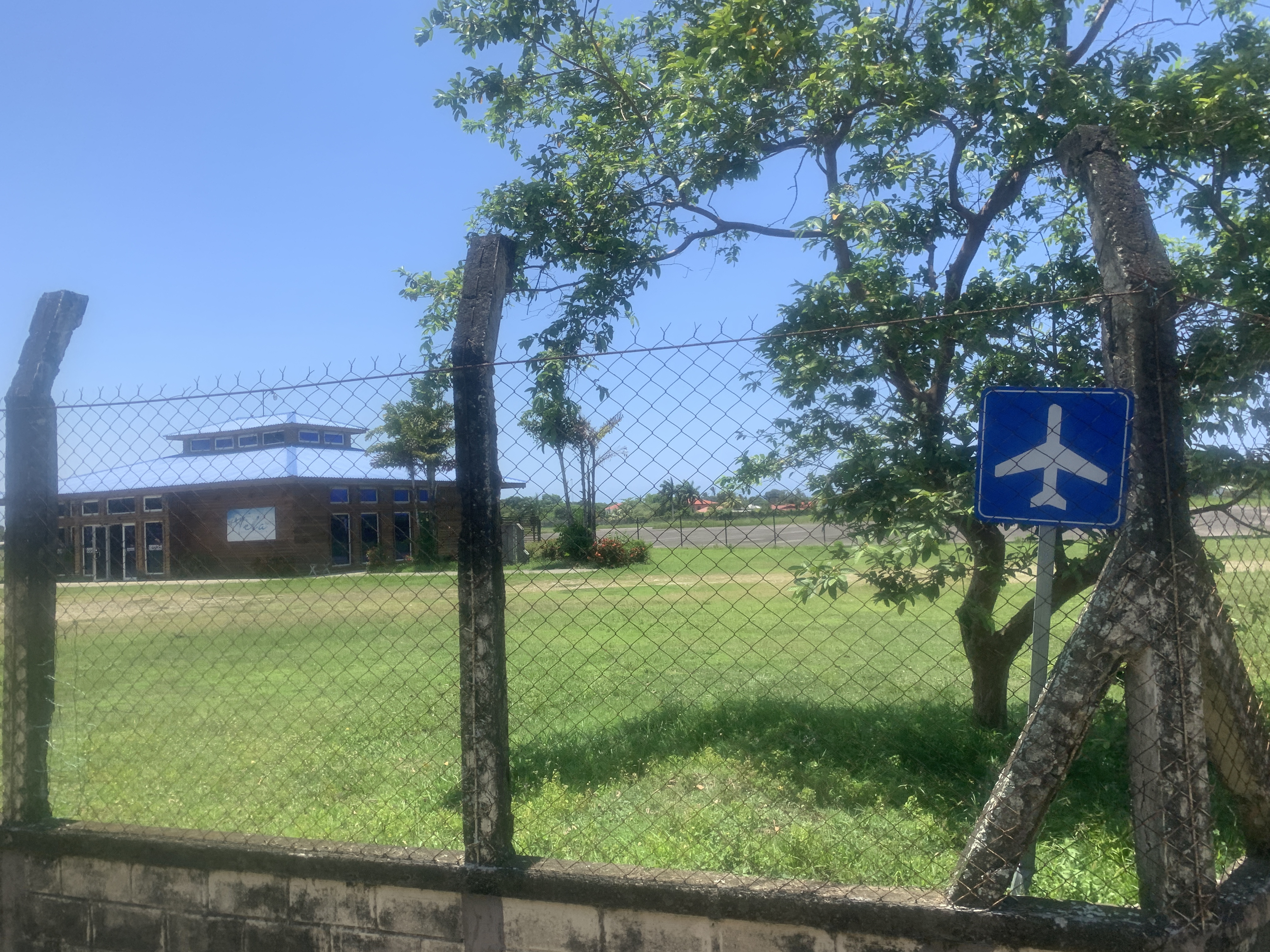
- IATA: TEA; ICAO: MHTE

Summary
- Airport type: Public
- Serves: Tela, Honduras
- Elevation AMSL: 7 ft (2.1 m)
- Coordinates: 15°46′35″N 87°28′30″W

Map
- Location in Honduras

Runways
Direction	Length		Surface
Direction	m	ft	Surface
06/24	1,600	5,249	Asphalt
- Source: GCM Google Maps SkyVector

Tela Airport (Spanish: Aeropuerto de Tela) (IATA: TEA, ICAO: MHTE) is an airport serving Tela, a town in the Atlántida Department on the northern coast of Honduras.

In 2009, plans were laid to lengthen the runway from 1,346 metres (4,416 ft) to 1,600 metres (5,200 ft) and possibly to construct a new terminal building. Construction began in 2014 and was estimated to cost US$13 million.

After completion, the new runway and terminal were inaugurated by Honduras President Juan Orlando Hernández on May 20, 2015.

There are hills southeast of the runway. Northeast approach and departure are over the water.

The La Mesa VOR-DME (Ident: LMS) is located 31.0 nautical miles (57.4 km) southwest of the airport. The Bonito VOR-DME (Ident: BTO) is located 35.4 nautical miles (65.6 km) east of the airport.

== See also ==
- List of airports in Honduras
- Transport in Honduras
