= Coyoles Airport =

Airport in Yoro Department, Honduras

- IATA: CYL; ICAO: MHCS

Summary
- Airport type: Private
- Serves: Coyoles, Honduras
- Elevation AMSL: 492 ft / 150 m
- Coordinates: 15°26′45″N 86°40′30″W

Map
- Location of the airport in Honduras

Runways
Direction	Length		Surface
Direction	m	ft	Surface
07/25	1,160	3,806	Asphalt
- Sources: GCM Google Maps SkyVector

Coyoles Airport (IATA: CYL, ICAO: MHCS) is an airport serving the town of Coyoles in Yoro Department, Honduras. The airport is just southwest of Coyoles, and 2 kilometres (1.2 mi) north of the Aguán River.

There are buildings within 18 metres (59 ft) of the runway on the east end.

The Bonito VOR-DME (Ident: BTO) is located 20.6 nautical miles (38.2 km) north-northwest of the airport.

== See also ==
- Transport in Honduras
- List of airports in Honduras
