= Santa Rosa de Copán Airport =

- IATA: SDH; ICAO: MHSR

Summary
- Airport type: Defunct
- Location: Santa Rosa de Copán, Honduras
- Elevation AMSL: 3,564 ft / 1,086 m
- Coordinates: 14°46′38″N 88°46′30″W

Map
- Location in Honduras

Runways
Direction	Length		Surface
Direction	m	ft	Surface
Closed
- Sources: Google Maps HERE/Nokia Maps GCM

Santa Rosa de Copán Airport (IATA: SDH, ICAO: MHSR) was an airport formerly serving Santa Rosa de Copán, a municipality in Copán Department, Honduras.

The Google Earth Historical Imagery (10/17/2007) image shows buildings covering the western half of the 710 metres (2,330 ft) gravel runway. Recent aerial imagery (11/21/2017) shows the runway completely built over.

== See also ==
- Transport in Honduras
- List of airports in Honduras
