= Palacios Airport =

- IATA: PCH; ICAO: MHPC

Summary
- Airport type: Public
- Serves: Palacios, Honduras
- Elevation AMSL: 18 ft / 5 m
- Coordinates: 15°57′15″N 84°56′25″W

Map
- Location of the airport in Honduras

Runways
| Direction | Length | | Surface |
| Direction | m | ft | Surface |
|---|---|---|---|
| 10/28 | 900 | 2,953 | Grass |
- Sources: GCM Google Maps SkyVector

Palacios Airport (IATA: PCH, ICAO: MHPC) is an airstrip serving the village of Palacios in Gracias a Dios Department, Honduras.

The runway is on the south side of a lagoon 0.8 kilometres (0.5 mi) inland from the Caribbean shore. An overrun to the west will drop into the lagoon.

== See also ==
- Transport in Honduras
- List of airports in Honduras
