= Santa Bárbara Airport (Honduras) =

- IATA: none; ICAO: MHSB

Summary
- Airport type: Closed
- Serves: Santa Bárbara, Honduras
- Elevation AMSL: 892 ft / 272 m
- Coordinates: 14°56′17″N 88°14′29″W

Map
- Location of the airport in Honduras

Runways
Direction	Length		Surface
Direction	m	ft	Surface
Closed
- Sources: Google Maps Bing Maps

Santa Bárbara Airport (ICAO: MHSB) was an airport formerly serving Santa Bárbara, capital of the Santa Bárbara Department of Honduras.

Current aerial images show a power line running down the middle of the former grass runway. Google Earth Historical Imagery (12/31/2010, 2/16/2015, 3/7/2018) show construction progressively covering both ends of the runway.

The airport had an earlier ICAO code of MHSZ.

== See also ==
- Transport in Honduras
- List of airports in Honduras
