= El Porvenir Airport (Honduras) =

- IATA: none; ICAO: MHPV

Summary
- Airport type: Public
- Serves: Saba, Honduras
- Location: El Porvenir
- Elevation AMSL: 226 ft / 69 m
- Coordinates: 15°31′50″N 86°16′30″W

Map
- Location of the airport in Honduras

Runways
Direction	Length		Surface
Direction	m	ft	Surface
09/27	800	2,625	Grass
- Sources: Google Maps SkyVector GCM

El Porvenir Airport (ICAO: MHPV) is an airport serving the towns of Sabá and El Porvenir in Colón Department, Honduras.

The airport is just south of El Porvenir, and 2 kilometres (1.2 mi) north of the Aguán River. There is nearby rising terrain west of the airport.

The Bonito VOR-DME (Ident: BTO) is located 36.3 nautical miles (67.2 km) west-northwest of the airport.

== See also ==
- Transport in Honduras
- List of airports in Honduras
