= Islas del Cisne Airport =

Airport serving the Swan Islands, Honduras

Islas del Cisne Airport Swan Islands
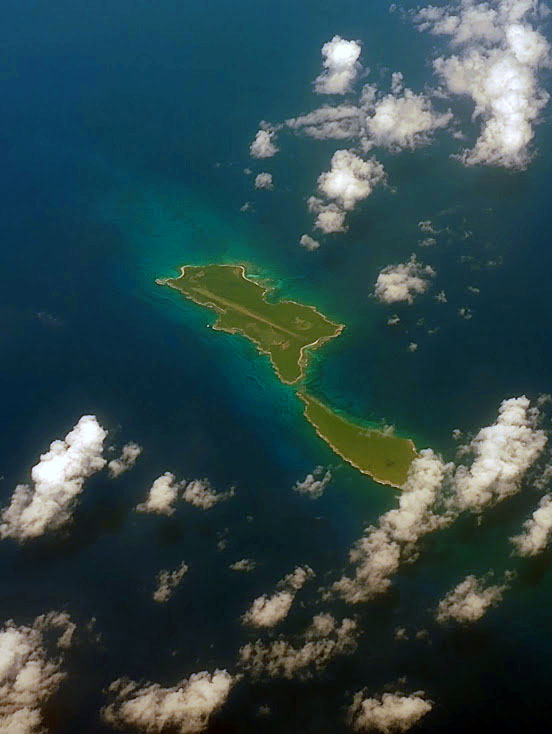
- IATA: none; ICAO: MHIC

Summary
- Airport type: Public
- Serves: Islas del Cisne, Honduras
- Elevation AMSL: 37 ft (11 m)
- Coordinates: 17°24′25″N 83°56′00″W

Map
- Location of the airport

Runways
Direction	Length		Surface
Direction	m	ft	Surface
06/24	1,880	6,168	Gravel
- Sources: GCM Google Maps SkyVector; Note: The location of the Swan Islands is beyond the coverage of the Honduras map.

Islas del Cisne Airport (ICAO: MHIC) is an airport serving the Swan Islands (Islas del Cisne), Honduras. It is located on Great Swan Island, in the Caribbean Sea, 180 kilometres (110 mi) north of the Honduran coast.

Approach and departure are over the water. The Islas del Cisne non-directional beacon (ident: SWA) is just off the western end of the runway. The Roatan VOR-DME (Ident: ROA) is located 162.5 nautical miles (301 km) west-southwest of the airport. A small Honduran naval garrison maintains the facility.

== See also ==
- Transport in Honduras
- List of airports in Honduras
