= OAN =

Oan or OAN may refer to:

== People ==
- Oan Djorkaeff (born 1997), French professional footballer
- Oan Ali Mohammed, DRFLA leader killed during the 1980 Iranian Embassy siege

== Observatories ==
- National Astronomical Observatory (Chile) (Spanish: Observatorio Astronómico Nacional de Chile), owned and operated by the University of Chile
- Spanish National Observatory (Spanish: Observatorio Astronómico Nacional de España), an astronomical observatory with several facilities in the Madrid area

== Organizations ==
- One America News Network (also: One America News), a far-right news and opinion channel
- Open Access Network, an organization that encourages partnerships between scholarly societies, research libraries, and other institutional partners
- Oxford Archaeology North, a unit of the British archaeology and heritage practice Oxford Archaeology

== Other uses ==
- El Arrayán Airport (IATA code: OAN), an airport serving the city of Olanchito in Yoro Department, Honduras
- Guardians of the Universe, using the demonym Oan, an extra terrestrial race from the planet Oa in the DC Comics universe
- Ōan (応安), name for the Japanese era used in the Northern Court for the years 1368–1375
- Open-access network, horizontally layered network architectures in telecommunications and the business model
- Orthodoxy, Autocracy, and Nationality, a doctrine of Tsar Nicholas I
- Oan Island, a small island in Param, Federated States of Micronesia
- One America News, American cable channel
