= La Unión Airport (Honduras) =

La Unión Airport Carta Airport
- IATA: LUI; ICAO: MHCR

Summary
- Airport type: Public
- Serves: La Unión
- Elevation AMSL: 2,625 ft / 800 m
- Coordinates: 15°02′00″N 86°41′33″W

Map
- Location of the airport in Honduras

Runways
Direction	Length		Surface
Direction	m	ft	Surface
01/19	900	2,953	Grass
- Sources: GCM Google Maps SkyVector

La Unión Airport (IATA: LUI, ICAO: MHCR) is an airport serving the town of La Unión in Olancho Department, Honduras.

The grass runway is 2 kilometres (1.2 mi) northeast of the town. There is high terrain west through northeast of the airport, with a hill immediately north of the runway.

The Bonito VOR-DME (Ident: BTO) is located 43.4 nautical miles (80.4 km) north-northwest of the airport. The La Ceiba NDB-DME (Ident: LCE) is located 43.9 nautical miles (81.3 km) north-northwest of the airport.

== See also ==
- Transport in Honduras
- List of airports in Honduras
