= Marcala Airport =

- IATA: MRJ; ICAO: MHMA

Summary
- Airport type: Defunct
- Serves: Marcala, Honduras
- Coordinates: 14°09′43″N 88°02′04″W

Map
- Location in Honduras

Runways
Direction	Length		Surface
Direction	m	ft	Surface
Closed
- Sources: Google Maps HERE/Nokia Maps GCM

Marcala Airport (IATA: MRJ, ICAO: MHMA) was an airport formerly serving Marcala, a municipality in La Paz Department, Honduras.

Aerial imaging shows a soccer stadium built midfield on the former 850 metres (2,790 ft) grass runway, with buildings covering both the north and south ends.

Google Earth Historical Images show the soccer field was completed and the airport closed sometime prior to 2002.

== See also ==
- Transport in Honduras
- List of airports in Honduras
