= Victoria Municipality =

Victoria Municipality may refer to:

Colombia

- Victoria, Caldas

Mexico

- Victoria Municipality, Guanajuato
- Victoria Municipality, Tamaulipas

Honduras

- Victoria, Yoro

See also

- Victoria (disambiguation)
