= Yoro Airport =

Airport in Yoro Department, Honduras

- IATA: ORO; ICAO: MHYR

Summary
- Airport type: Public
- Serves: Yoro
- Elevation AMSL: 2,215 ft / 675 m
- Coordinates: 15°07′40″N 87°08′08″W

Map
- Location of the airport in Honduras

Runways
Direction	Length		Surface
Direction	m	ft	Surface
16/34	900	2,953	Grass
- Sources: GCM Google Maps

Yoro Airport (IATA: ORO, ICAO: MHYR) is an airport serving the town of Yoro in Yoro Department, Honduras.

The runway is in an open field crossed by unpaved roads and footpaths on the southwest side of the town. There is mountainous terrain north and immediately south of the runway.

The Bonito VOR-DME (Ident: BTO) is located 39.8 nautical miles (73.7 km) north-northeast of the airport.

== See also ==
- Transport in Honduras
- List of airports in Honduras
