= El Aguacate Airport =

- IATA: CAA; ICAO: MHGE

Summary
- Airport type: Public
- Serves: Catacamas
- Elevation AMSL: 1,296 ft / 395 m
- Coordinates: 14°52′30″N 85°46′30″W

Map
- Location of the airport in Honduras

Runways
Direction	Length		Surface
Direction	m	ft	Surface
07/25	1,540	5,052	Asphalt
- Sources: GCM Google Maps SkyVector

El Aguacate Airport (ICAO: MHGE) is an airport serving the city of Catacamas in Olancho Department, Honduras. The airport is 12 kilometres (7.5 mi) east of the city.

The runway has an additional 760 metres (2,490 ft) of paved overrun on the western end.

== See also ==
- List of airports in Honduras
- Transport in Honduras
