= Cauquira Airport =

- IATA: CDD; ICAO: MHCU

Summary
- Airport type: Public
- Serves: Cauquira, Honduras
- Elevation AMSL: 21 ft / 6 m
- Coordinates: 15°19′15″N 83°36′15″W

Map
- Location of the airport in Honduras

Runways
Direction	Length		Surface
Direction	m	ft	Surface
11/29	940	3,084	Grass
- Sources: GCM Google Maps SkyVector

Cauquira Airport (IATA: CDD, ICAO: MHCU) is an airstrip serving Cauquira, a village in Gracias a Dios Department, Honduras. The airstrip and village are on a wooded barrier spit protecting the Cauquira and Caratasca Lagoons. The airstrip is 0.8 kilometres (0.5 mi) inland from the Caribbean shore.

The Puerto Lempira non-directional beacon (Ident: PLP) is located 11.4 nautical miles (21.1 km) west-southwest of the airstrip.

== See also ==
- Transport in Honduras
- List of airports in Honduras
