= Copán Ruinas Airport =

Honduran airport

Copán Ruinas International Airport Rio Amarillo Airport
- IATA: RUY; ICAO: MHRU

Summary
- Airport type: Public
- Serves: Copán Ruinas
- Elevation AMSL: 2,336 ft / 712 m
- Coordinates: 14°55′00″N 89°00′28″W

Map
- Location of the airport in Honduras

Runways
Direction	Length		Surface
Direction	m	ft	Surface
18/36	1,400	4,593	Concrete
- Sources: GCM Google Maps

Copán Ruinas Airport (IATA: RUY, ICAO: MHRU) is a newly completed airport serving the town of Copán Ruinas in Honduras. The runway is approximately 20 kilometres (12 mi) east of the town.

The airport was opened in 2015, and is expected to provide easier tourist access to the Mayan ruins at Copán. A second construction phase is planned that will allow aircraft with up to 100 passengers to land.

== See also ==
- Transport in Honduras
- List of airports in Honduras
