= La Lima Airport =

La Lima Airport Reginaldo Hammer Airport
- IATA: LLH; ICAO: none

Summary
- Airport type: Public
- Serves: La Lima
- Elevation AMSL: 96 ft / 29 m
- Coordinates: 15°26′35″N 87°53′55″W

Map
- Location of the airport in Honduras

Runways
Direction	Length		Surface
Direction	m	ft	Surface
02/20	890	2,920	Asphalt
- Sources: GCM Google Maps

La Lima Airport (IATA: LLH) is a general aviation airport serving the town of La Lima in Cortés Department, Honduras. The airport is 2.8 kilometres (1.7 mi) east of San Pedro Sula's Ramón Villeda Morales International Airport.

The La Mesa VOR-DME (ident:LMS) is 1.7 nautical miles (3.1 km) north-northwest of the airport.

== See also ==
- Transport in Honduras
- List of airports in Honduras
