= Victoria Airport (Honduras) =

- IATA: none; ICAO: none; LID: VTA

Summary
- Airport type: Public
- Serves: Victoria
- Elevation AMSL: 1,200 ft / 366 m
- Coordinates: 14°56′05″N 87°23′39″W

Map
- Location of the airport in Honduras

Runways
Direction	Length		Surface
Direction	m	ft	Surface
18/36	690	2,264	Grass
- Sources: GCM Google Maps

Victoria Airport is an airport serving the town of Victoria in Yoro Department, Honduras. The airport is adjacent to the southwest side of the town.

There is mountainous terrain north through southeast of the airport, and rising terrain in other quadrants.

The Soto Cano VORTAC (Ident: ESC) is located 35.2 nautical miles (65.2 km) south-southwest of the airport.

== See also ==
- Transport in Honduras
- List of airports in Honduras
