= Mayors of Choluteca =

List of Mayors of the Municipality of Choluteca, Honduras

This is a list of mayors of the Municipality of Choluteca, Honduras that are elected by democratic elections:

| Mayor | Period | Party |
|---|---|---|
| Quintin Soriano(re-elected) | 2010–2014 | Liberal |
| Quintin Soriano | 2006–2010 | Liberal |
| Ricardo Andino Cruz | 2002–2006 | National |
| Juan Benito Guevara | 1998–2002 | Liberal |
| Adriana de Jesus Guevara | 1994–1998 | Liberal |
