= Choluteca, Choluteca =

Choluteca
- Municipality
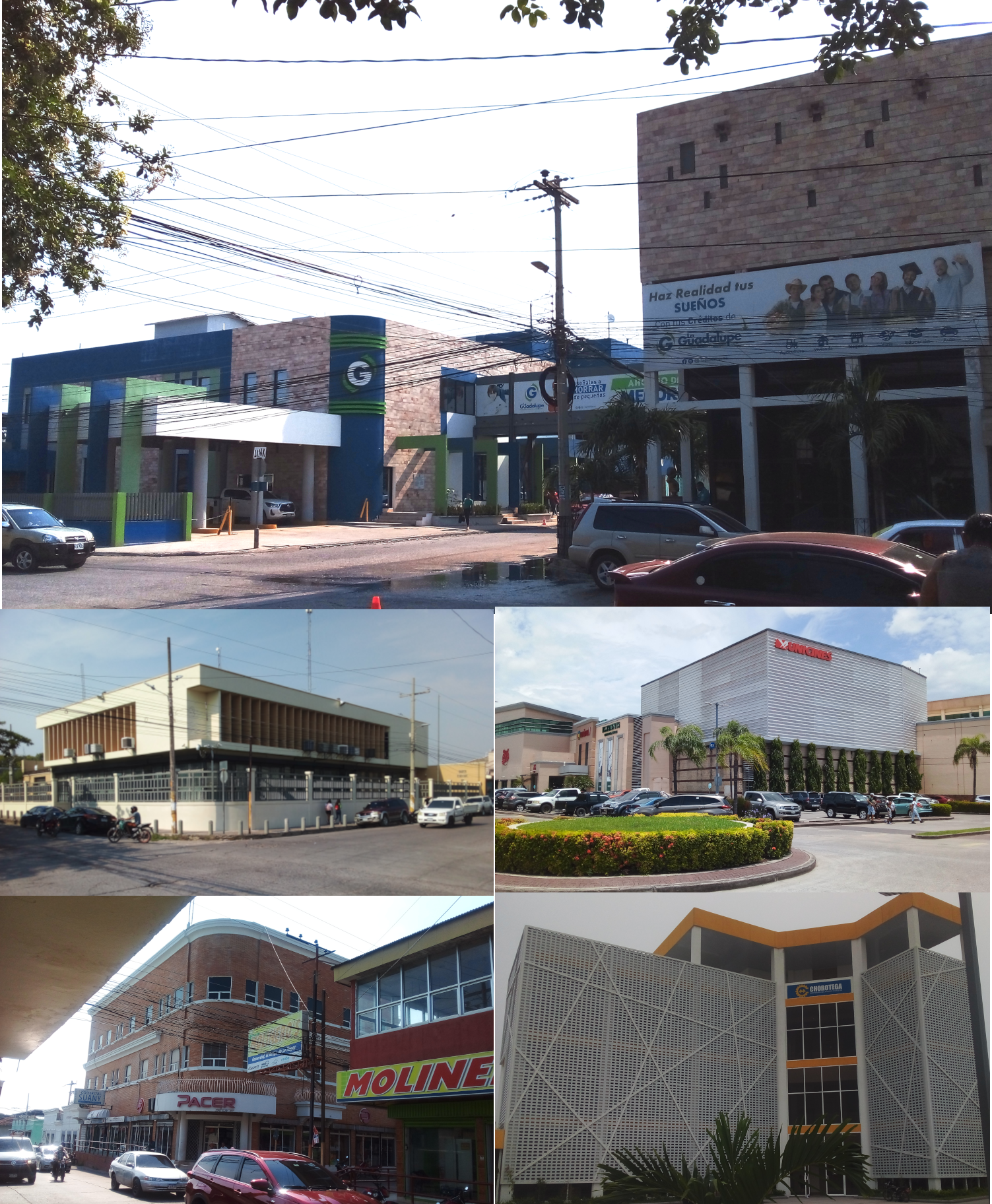
- Choluteca City
- Nicknames: Cholu, Cholutexas
- Location within Honduras
- Coordinates: 13°18′10″N 87°11′00″W
- Country: Honduras
- Department: Choluteca
- Municipality: Choluteca
- Founded: 1522
- Villa Title: 1585
- City Title: 1845

Government
  - Type: Democratic Municipality
  - Mayor: Eber Aplicano
  - Vice-Mayor: Indiana Solorzano

Area
  - Municipality: 1,072 km^{2} (414 sq mi)

Population (2023 projection)
  - Municipality: 175,056
  - Density: 163.3/km^{2} (422.9/sq mi)
  - Urban: 115,906
- Abbreviation: Cholu
- Climate: Am

Choluteca is a municipality and the capital city of the Honduran department of the same name. Situated in southern Honduras between El Salvador and Nicaragua, the city is generally considered the regional centre of southern Honduras and is a major transit point on the Pan-American Highway. It has a major bus station and is home to the regional light (ENEE) and water (SANAA) utilities. The city is located on the Choluteca River, near the centre of the department. An arching silver bridge crosses the river into the city.

Choluteca's population of 99,980 (2023 calculation) makes it the seventh largest city in the country. It is the only major Honduran city on the Pan-American Highway. It is considered to be the second-hottest city in Honduras after Nacaome.

== History ==
When Spanish conquistadors arrived in southern Honduras in 1535, the Chorotega indigenous people inhabited the area. In 1541, a town was founded there by Captain Cristobál de la Cueva which was known as Villa de Xerez de la Frontera de Choluteca. The conquistadors had a practice of establishing colonies in their territories in strategic locations to dominate and take over the land from the indigenous people. With the founding of Xerex de la Frontera, that strategy was used to possess a communication center with the sister republics of Guatemala and Nicaragua. Like other parts of Honduras, the Choluteca area had many mineral deposits and fertile land for agriculture, making it one of the richest colonies of Honduras for the Spanish government.

From its founding, Villa de Xerez de la Frontera depended on the Guatemalan government, but in 1580, it became part of the Tegucigalpa, Honduras municipality. Under the Honduran president Coronado Chávez, the city was officially named “Choluteca” on October 1, 1845 by the National Congress of the Republic.

There are many versions of Choluteca's founding. Federico Lunardi says it was established in 1535, Rómulo Ernesto Durón says 1533, and Doris Stone says 1540. The modern historian Marxis Lenin Hernández says there is a need to investigate the real origin of Choluteca because of these discrepancies. He says that Federico Lunardi's version of the history is the most widespread.

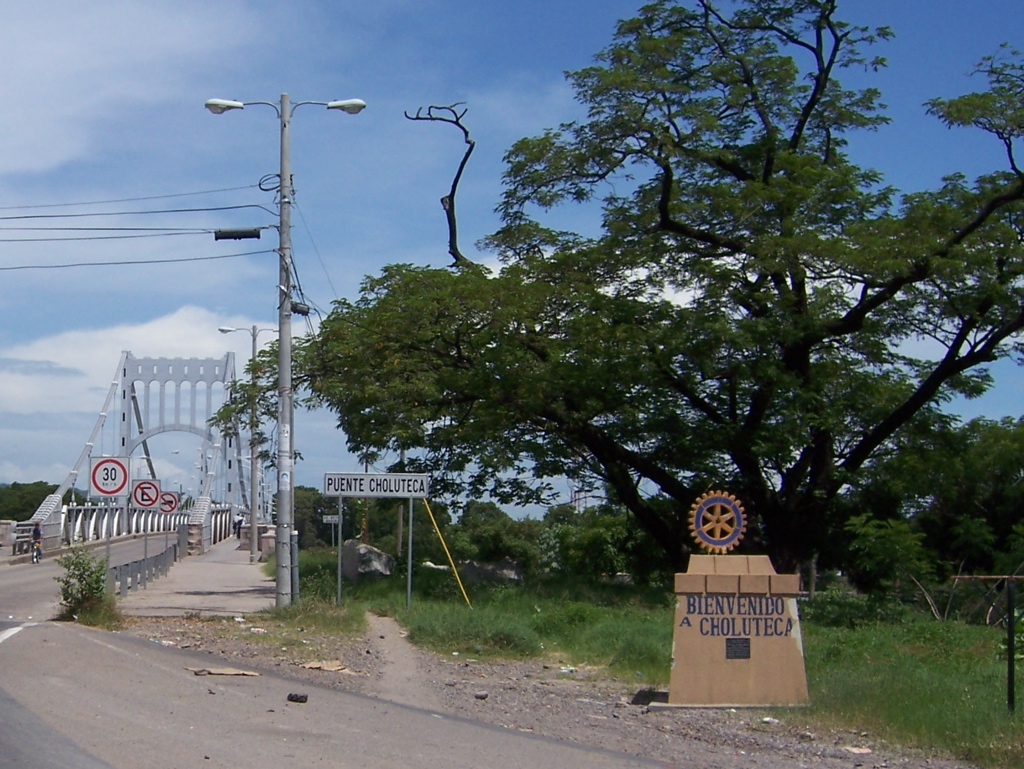
Entering Choluteca across the river

Over the years, Choluteca has developed into one of the country's most important centers of history, culture, and commerce.

The city was heavily damaged by flooding from Hurricane Mitch in 1998. It received more rainfall than any other place affected by the storm – 36 inches in only a few days. This is the amount of rain the city normally receives in 212 days. In addition, the Choluteca River swelled to six times its normal width, putting entire neighbourhoods under water temporarily. Many villages and suburbs, like Stevensville, were badly damaged, suffering immense property losses and a high number of deaths.

The charity Solar net Village helped to rebuild San Ramón, Choluteca and restored electricity in San Francisco, Lempira.

Choluteca is one of the most productive areas of Honduras. The department raises commodity crops of sugar, cantaloupe, watermelon, okra, and sweet potato. It also harvests shrimp and fish, and produces salt, and a few precious metals.

José Cecilio del Valle, the first President of Central America, was born in Choluteca in 1780. His house (Casa Valle, located on the main square) is now a cultural centre housing the local library and a tourist centre. The house is featured on the back of the 100-lempira note.

Dania Prince, Miss Earth 2003 and the only Honduran to win a grandslam beauty pageant, came from Choluteca.

== Transport ==
The city is served by Choluteca Airport, which, as of 2022, has no commercial airline services.

== Climate ==
Choluteca is one of the hottest cities of Central America and the hottest in Honduras, as well gives a tropical monsoon climate (Köppen: Am), the registered high temperature of the city is 42.4 °C (108.3 °F) in March 1984 and the lowest is 17 °C (62.6 °F).

Climate data for Choluteca, Choluteca
Month	Jan	Feb	Mar	Apr	May	Jun	Jul	Aug	Sep	Oct	Nov	Dec	Year
Record high °C (°F)	38.6 (101.5)	40.4 (104.7)	42.4 (108.3)	45.9 (114.6)	44.7 (112.5)	44.0 (111.2)	36.5 (97.7)	36.5 (97.7)	35.1 (95.2)	34.9 (94.8)	35.9 (96.6)	36.0 (96.8)	45.9 (114.6)
Mean daily maximum °C (°F)	34.9 (94.8)	36.0 (96.8)	37.0 (98.6)	38.1 (100.6)	36.1 (97.0)	34.0 (93.2)	34.1 (93.4)	33.0 (91.4)	32.6 (90.7)	32.6 (90.7)	33.5 (92.3)	34.3 (93.7)	34.7 (94.4)
Daily mean °C (°F)	28.6 (83.5)	29.2 (84.6)	30.1 (86.2)	31.0 (87.8)	29.5 (85.1)	28.8 (83.8)	28.8 (83.8)	28.7 (83.7)	28.7 (83.7)	28.6 (83.5)	28.6 (83.5)	28.6 (83.5)	29.1 (84.4)
Mean daily minimum °C (°F)	23.1 (73.6)	23.0 (73.4)	23.5 (74.3)	24.5 (76.1)	24.2 (75.6)	23.4 (74.1)	23.8 (74.8)	23.6 (74.5)	22.9 (73.2)	22.8 (73.0)	22.7 (72.9)	23.0 (73.4)	23.4 (74.1)
Record low °C (°F)	19.7 (67.5)	20.0 (68.0)	20.4 (68.7)	21.8 (71.2)	21.7 (71.1)	21.6 (70.9)	21.2 (70.2)	21.1 (70.0)	21.2 (70.2)	21.1 (70.0)	20.5 (68.9)	19.6 (67.3)	19.6 (67.3)
Average rainfall mm (inches)	1 (0.0)	2 (0.1)	8 (0.3)	10 (0.4)	321 (12.6)	342 (13.5)	110 (4.3)	230 (9.1)	350 (13.8)	320 (12.6)	40.0 (1.57)	6.7 (0.26)	1,740.7 (68.53)
Average rainy days (≥ 1.0 mm)	0	1	8	3	20	20	23	23	23	19	4	1	145
Mean monthly sunshine hours	292.9	272.0	291.2	242.7	235.6	211.1	232.6	234.3	194.8	233.3	246.1	274.2	2,960.8
Source: NOAA

== Notable persons ==
=== Miss Earth ===
Dania Prince, Miss Earth 2003.

== See also ==
- Solar Net International
