= TAN-SAHSA Flight 414 =

1989 aviation accident

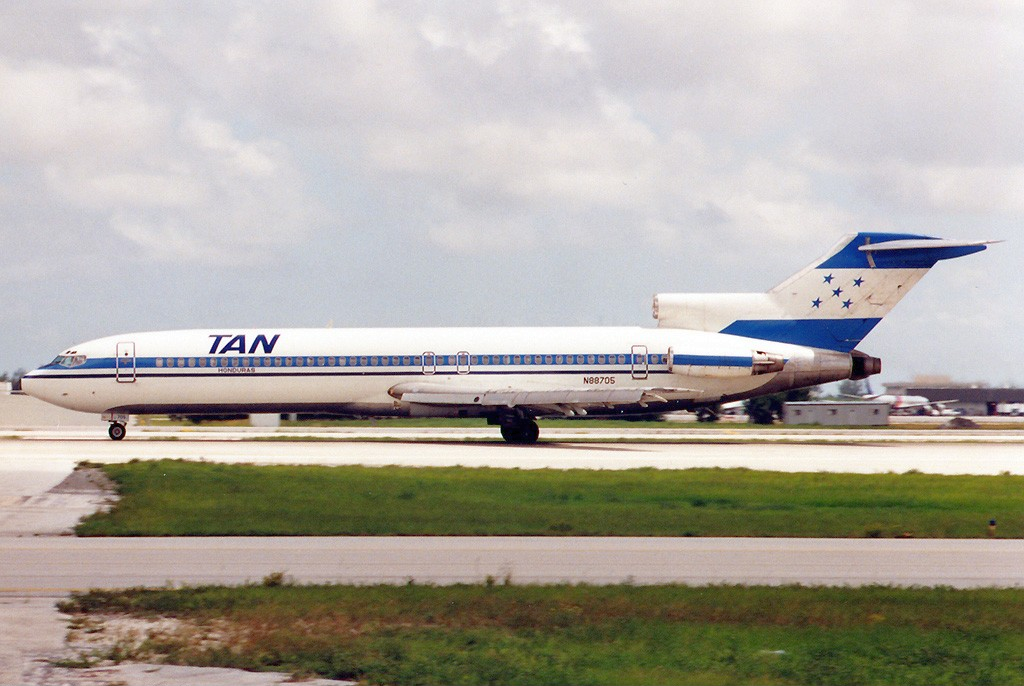
- N88705, the aircraft involved in the accident, pictured in July 1989

Accident
- Date: 21 October 1989
- Summary: Controlled flight into terrain on approach due to low visibility and pilot error
- Site: Cerro de Hula, 9 km (5.6 mi; 4.9 nmi) south of Toncontín International Airport, Tegucigalpa, Honduras; 13°56′43″N 87°14′27″W

Aircraft
- Aircraft type: Boeing 727-224
- Operator: TAN-SAHSA
- IATA flight No.: SH414
- ICAO flight No.: SHA414
- Call sign: SAHSA 414
- Registration: N88705
- Flight origin: Juan Santamaría International Airport, San José, Costa Rica
- Stopover: Augusto C. Sandino International Airport, Managua, Nicaragua
- Destination: Toncontín International Airport, Tegucigalpa, Honduras
- Occupants: 146
- Passengers: 138
- Crew: 8
- Fatalities: 131
- Injuries: 15
- Survivors: 15

TAN-SAHSA Flight 414 was a scheduled flight from Juan Santamaría International Airport, San José, Costa Rica, to Toncontín Airport in Tegucigalpa, Honduras, with a stopover at Augusto C. Sandino Airport in Managua, Nicaragua, on 21 October 1989. Flown with a Boeing 727-200, the flight crashed into a mountain at 7:30 A.M. local time after the pilots failed to follow a special landing procedure required for the arrival to the airport. The crash killed 131 passengers, leaving 15 survivors (including all three pilots). While 20 passengers initially survived, five died before treatment, due to a delay in rescue personnel because of bad weather. It remains, as of 2025, the worst aviation accident on Honduran soil and in Central America at large; it is also the 15th deadliest involving a Boeing 727.

== Aircraft and crew ==
The aircraft was a Boeing 727-224, registered as N88705, leased from Continental Airlines, and first flown in 1968. It was delivered to TAN-SAHSA in 1981. The aircraft was equipped with a flight data recorder, cockpit voice recorder, and ground proximity warning system (GPWS). However, the GPWS was disconnected at the time of the accident because the system was not required by Honduras at that time.

The crew of flight 414 consisted of 34-year-old Captain Raúl Argueta, 26-year-old First Officer Reiniero Canales and Flight Engineer Marco Figueroa, all three were employed at Tan-Sahsa.

== Flight and accident ==
The flight was approaching Toncontín Airport when Tegucigalpa ATC cleared the flight for the VOR/DME approach to runway 01. Because of high terrain in the area, the approach uses a series of three step-downs from the initial approach fix of 7,500 feet (2,300 m) MSL. The crew began a continuous descent from about 7,600 feet (2,300 m) MSL at about 11 nautical miles (13 mi; 20 km) from the airport, rather than following the prescribed step-down procedure, which led to the accident site. The aircraft's descent profile was well below the published step-down course for the entire approach. The aircraft impacted a mountain known as Cerro de Hula at the 4,800 feet (1,500 m) MSL elevation, approximately 800 feet (240 m) below the summit, 4.8 nautical miles (5.5 mi; 8.9 km) from the Tegucigalpa runway 01 threshold. At impact, the aircraft was in approach configuration.

The plane broke into three sections. The first part (cockpit, first class), contained almost all of the survivors of the accident, due to the close-to-stall, nose high configuration at impact.

The passengers had no warning of the impending collision and therefore no time to react. One survivor, Hernan Madrid, described the incident: "The pilot announced that, in a few minutes, we would arrive in Tegucigalpa. We entered a cloud and the plane began to tremble and came down. Later, explosions were heard." Other passengers were asleep when the crash occurred.

== Aftermath ==
Due to the high speed impact, burning debris was scattered over a large area. Despite this, rescue workers were able to recover all 131 bodies by Saturday evening which were subsequently sent to a local morgue for identification. While the National Transportation Safety Board and the Civil Aviation Authority of Honduras were investigating the crash, the three pilots Argueta, Canales and Figueroa were charged with manslaughter and negligence and went to trial. However, the case was never resolved.

Additionally, the families of some victims filed suit under the case name Transportes Aereos Nacionales, S.A. v. de Brenes. The suit consolidated 31 wrongful-death actions and centered around the "recoverability of moral damages". While the actions were initially filed in the Circuit Court of Dade County, Florida, the case would be decided under Nicaraguan law. The plaintiffs were originally awarded stipulated pecuniary damages of $1,000,000 and a jury verdict of $1,500,000 in moral damages. The plaintiff of an additional suit, Transportes Aereos Nacionales, S.A. v. de Brenes was awarded pecuniary damages of $144,000 and moral damages of $1,494,000. However, these decisions were eventually overturned and further petitions were denied.

Five months later another aircraft, a Lockheed L-188 Electra operated by SAHSA Carga registered as HR-TNL, crashed close to Flight 414's crash site, with a similar cause, making it the third accident by SAHSA in six months. SAHSA aircraft were involved in several incidents and crashes from 1962–1993. The company was also implicated in an airfare-fixing conspiracy along with Air Florida and two other Central American airlines, including TAN (before the two companies merged). SAHSA officially disbanded in January 1994.
