= Puerto Lempira Airport =

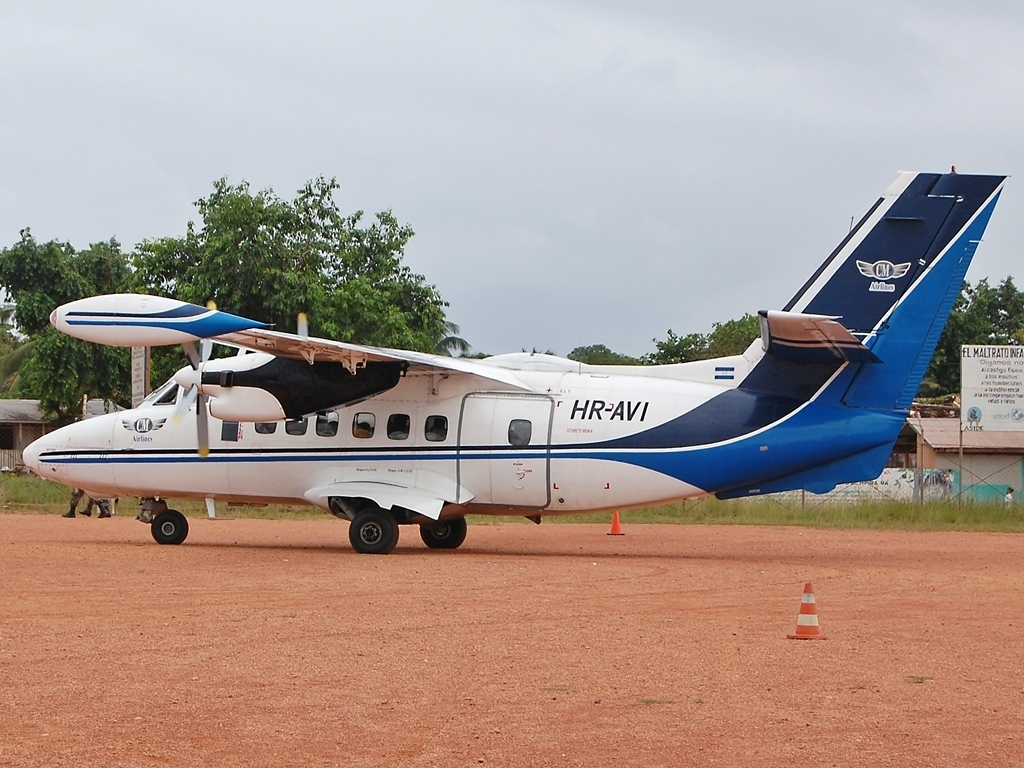
- Let L-410 at Puerto Lempira Airport
- IATA: PEU; ICAO: MHPL

Summary
- Airport type: Public
- Operator: State government
- Serves: Puerto Lempira
- Elevation AMSL: 33 ft (10 m)
- Coordinates: 15°15′45″N 83°46′55″W

Map
- Location of the airport in Honduras

Runways
Direction	Length		Surface
Direction	m	ft	Surface
09/27	1,500	4,921	Dirt
- Source: AirDB Google Maps GCM

Puerto Lempira Airport (IATA: PEU, ICAO: MHPL) is an airport serving Puerto Lempira in Gracias a Dios Department, Honduras. It handles regional air traffic for the city. It is also a hub for general aviation and the Honduran Air Force.

The airport is within Puerto Lempira, the capital city of the Gracias a Dios Department. It is the principal transportation link to the rest of Honduras, as there are no paved highways leading to the city. The airport and city are on the shore of the Caratasca Lagoon, which provides the town's main economy. The airport and the township suffered substantial damage in 1998, after Hurricane Mitch made landfall in the general area.

== Airlines and destinations ==
The following airlines operate regular scheduled services to the airport:

Airlines	Destinations
CM Airlines	Tegucigalpa

== Accidents and incidents ==
- On 27 December 1979, a Douglas C-47 belonging to the Honduran Air Force crashed near the airport, killing the two crew and injuring several passengers. The plane was written off.

== See also ==
- Transport in Honduras
- List of airports in Honduras
