= El Arrayán Airport =

- IATA: OAN; ICAO: MHEA

Summary
- Airport type: Public
- Serves: Olanchito, Honduras
- Elevation AMSL: 722 ft / 220 m
- Coordinates: 15°30′25″N 86°34′35″W

Map
- Location of the airport in Honduras

Runways
Direction	Length		Surface
Direction	m	ft	Surface
15/33	540	1,772	Gravel
- Sources: GCM Google Maps SkyVector

El Arrayán Airport (IATA: OAN, ICAO: MHEA) is an airport serving the city of Olanchito in Yoro Department, Honduras.

The runway is just north of the city, and also serves as a local road segment. There is high terrain northwest through east of the airport.

The Bonito VOR-DME (Ident: BTO) is located 21.7 nautical miles (40.2 km) northwest of the airport. The La Ceiba NDB-DME (Ident: LCE) is located 23.0 nautical miles (42.6 km) northwest of the airport.

== See also ==
- Transport in Honduras
- List of airports in Honduras
