= The Global Experience =

The Global Experience (formerly Solar Net International) is an international non-governmental organization that is involved with projects of global learning and Education for Sustainable Development.

== History ==
In 2005 a group of students and teachers from the Schillergymnasium in Münster founded the association Solar Net International e.V with the aim to support the intercultural dialogue of young people around the globe. In 2006, the organization was awarded the "North-South Prize" by the city of Münster. In 2011, counting by then almost 8000 members in more than 160 nations, the organization changed its name to The Global Experience in order to set a stronger focus on the organizations main goal, which is enhancing intercultural learning experiences across the globe.

== Website ==
In 2006 the group opened an online forum that allows members to post reports about their daily lives to share with others. Through publishing language learning videos on YouTube the online community has been growing constantly. In 2011 the website was awarded with the World Summit Youth Award that promotes best practice in e-content putting the UN Millennium Development Goals into action.

== Projects ==
The Global Experience initiates and supports projects in the field of Education for Sustainable Development and intercultural learning. Above that the different national groups also run own projects to improve the access to education in their local communities.

Besides the German group, members in other countries have been forming their own associations and projects under the name of The Global Experience, amongst others in Poland, Vietnam, Belgium, Colombia and Zimbabwe.

Since 2007 the organization annually holds international youth conferences that invite young members from across the world for a two weeks program to Germany in order to develop and initiate common projects.

In summer 2011 The Global Experience launched a new project called "International Reporters". On their website www.internationalreporters.org an international editorial team with students from 20 countries report about issues of cultural awareness, sustainable development and social change. The project was recognized in November 2011 as a good practice project for Education for Sustainable Development in Germany.

== Recognition ==
Since its founding, this group has received recognition from several entities:

- The North-South Prize of the city of Münster 2006
- UNICEF Junior Ambassador 2007
- The Dieter Baacke Preis (Prize) 2008
- Official Project of the UN Decade Education for Sustainable Development in Germany 2009/2010 and 2010/2011
- Winner of the World Summit Youth Award 2011 in the category "Create your Culture"
