= Victoria Airport (Montreal) =

Former airport in Montreal

Coordinates: 45°28′37″N 073°32′39″W

Victoria Airport (IATA: YMY, ICAO: CYMY) was a short takeoff and landing (STOL) aircraft landing strip located near downtown Montreal, Quebec, Canada. It was the result of a research program launched by the Government of Canada, and was served exclusively by Airtransit, a corporation that served as a technological showcase for the Canadian STOL industry.

The airport was built on a former parking lot from Expo 67, and was decommissioned less than two years after its inauguration on April 30, 1976, as Airtransit experienced mixed success and technical constraints.

== History ==
=== Establishing a STOL (Short Take-Off and Landing) sector ===
In December 1970, the "Conseil de science" (Council of science) submitted a report to the Government of Canada recommending the establishment of a STOL airport development program to maintain the country's strategic advantage in aeronautics. The council recommended that the program should focus on aircraft construction, navigational aids, and air traffic control.

In May 1971, the Government of Canada announced $150 million in funding for the program, which was intended to become a technological showcase. The idea was presented at the 1971 Paris Air Show where the STOL technology was promoted by various exhibitors as a solution to bring aircraft closer to city centers.

=== Site selection ===
The government quickly began searching for a site where an airport could be built. It needed a short runway cable to accommodate De Havilland Canada's current and future STOL aircraft: the DHC-6 Twin Otter, a bush plane, and the DHC-7, a model under development for mass transportation. It also had to be built for other models such as Canadair's CL-246 vertical takeoff and landing aircraft, a civilian version of the CL-84. The Cartierville Airport site was considered, but the former Victoria parking lot, an 11,300-space lot used for Expo 67, emerged as the preferred solution for an airport. It was chosen due to its proximity to downtown Montreal and the St. Lawrence River, ensuring an unobstructed view of the horizon.

The site selection was the subject of much criticism. First, the future airport would be located on a former landfill fraught with soil (unstable and spongy), contaminated by escaping gases and with sewage released into it. Second, Transport Canada was criticized for the runway configuration; there are concerns that residents of the working-class neighbourhoods of Pointe-Saint-Charles and Verdun, located under the approach paths, would be disturbed by aircraft noise, particularly in bad weather. Data from the administration nevertheless indicated that the noise could not exceed tolerable levels in these neighbourhoods. Finally, the Montreal Port Authority, which managed the site, opposed the conversion of the former Victoria parking lot into an airport because it had plans of building a container transshipment centre on this strategically located site: it was nestled between two highways and a major Canadian National Railway rail yard.

Despite criticism and concerns, construction of the airport on the former landfill began in 1972 and was completed in November 1973. Following the construction of Montréal–Mirabel International Airport, plans were even made to provide monorail service to the future urban airport, which would connect downtown Montreal as well as to the two international airports of Greater Montreal.

The airport's opening was postponed several times: the tarmac caved in by 4 to 6 inches (10 to 15 cm) in the spring of 1974, threatening the underground power cable. Later, the runway suddenly caught fire due to methane escaping from cracks in the pavement.

== Operations ==
Airtransit, a subsidiary of Air Canada, was incorporated on June 19, 1973. Transport Canada tasked it with conducting a project for a service between Victoria Airport and Ottawa/Rockcliffe Airport, initially using eleven-seat Twin Otter aircraft, and later with DHC-7s once they became commercially available. The CL-246, whose development was halted due to the anticipated end of the Vietnam War, was not included in the project.

Victoria Airport was served by small DHC-6 Twin Otters. Starting in the summer of 1974, Airtransit operated fifteen daily departures between Montreal and Ottawa, every hour. The minimum ticket price was set at $20.

In its first year, 96,000 passengers used the airport, even though 100,000 to 120,000 passengers were forecasted. The service immediately proved unprofitable. The delayed development of the DHC-7 was arguably the biggest reason for the project's failure, as it forced Airtransit to operate with smaller, unprofitable DHC-6s. Furthermore, the niche market of short-haul air transport limited the clientele to only high-earning executives. Airtransit struggled to position its product in a highly competitive market with faster and cheaper ways of transportation.

Moreover, since the STOL program was designed before the 1973 oil crisis, the unexpected surge in fuel prices burdened the airline's profit deficit, which was twice the price as anticipated.

Finally, the choice of location for the project, Ottawa, was a medium-sized administrative city, rather than Toronto, a metropolis and a financial center hosting numerous corporate headquarters. This was also a contributing factor to the project's failures.

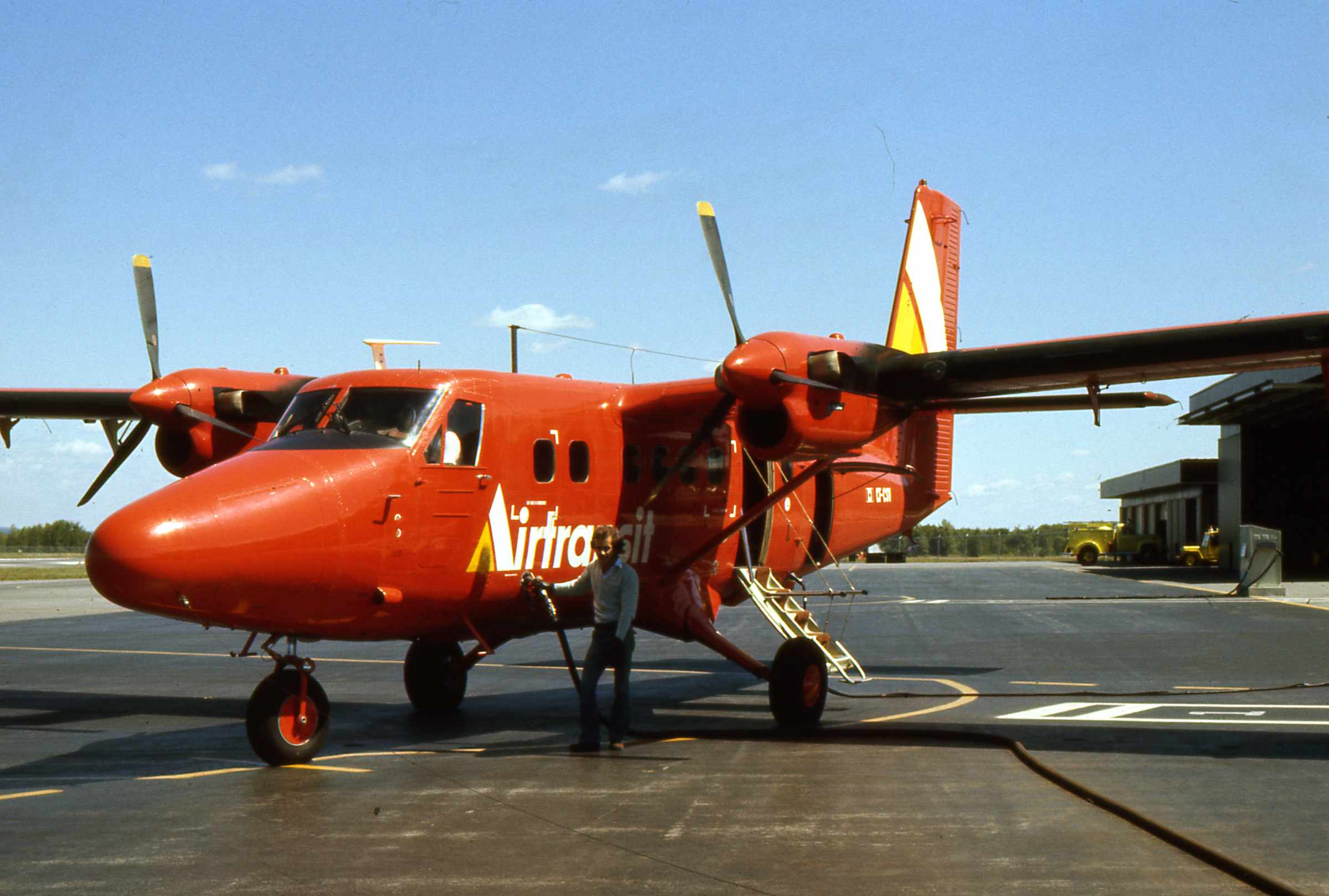
A DHC-6 Twin Otter

== Closure and abandonment ==
Faced with the challenges and mixed results, "Transports Canada" terminated the pilot project on April 30, 1976, three months ahead of schedule. The airport's infrastructure was called into question: the land lease with the National Harbours Board was expiring, methane was still leaking from the ground—which was collapsing beneath the runway—and the temporary buildings were nearing the end of their lifespan.

Around the area, problems intensified: the construction of skyscrapers in Verdun threatened flight paths. On the other side, in Ottawa, residents of the Rockcliffe Park neighbourhood, complained of being disturbed by aircraft noise.

Air West and Nordair proposed to resume service and improve the network of airports, but demanded subsidies to make the service profitable. However, without planned renovations, without government funding, and without a destination to serve, Victoria Airport was finally decommissioned on April 30, 1976.

== Location ==
The Victoria Airport was located southwest of downtown Montreal. Access to the airport was via a road built for the airport (now "Rue Marc-Cantin") The terminal was a five-minute drive from Bonaventure Square, Windsor Station, the Bonaventure Metro Station, and the Queen Elizabeth Hotel bus terminal. A free shuttle, called the "ADACmobile," reserved for airline ticket holders, provided service between Bonaventure Square and the airport, departing for the terminal 15 minutes before each flight.

The runway was conveniently located near the city center, but its proximity to the St. Lawrence River made it vulnerable to inclement weather: 7% of scheduled flights were cancelled due to difficult navigational conditions.

The airport site was used as a landfill from the early 20th century. Despite recommendations from the "Comité de santé de la ville de Montréal", the port authority, and later, the Canadian National Railway company, successively authorized the City to dump its collected waste in the former's runway location. Landfilling activities peaked between 1955 and 1965, when the entire area was used as a dump. From 1965 to 1967, this landfill was hastily filled to form the largest parking lot for the 1967 Expo. The ground was already showing signs of instability, with bumps and unevenness created by vehicles driving over the surface daily. The parking lot was abandoned the following year.

After the airport closed, the site was abandoned for about fifteen years. In August 1984, "Environnement Canada" revealed, following a study, that the methane escaping from the soil of the former airport was concentrated enough to pose an explosion risk.

In 1988, the site was acquired by the City of Montreal to create the Pointe-Saint-Charles Business Park. The soil of the former airport and the water it contained underwent multiple renovations to make the land profitable.

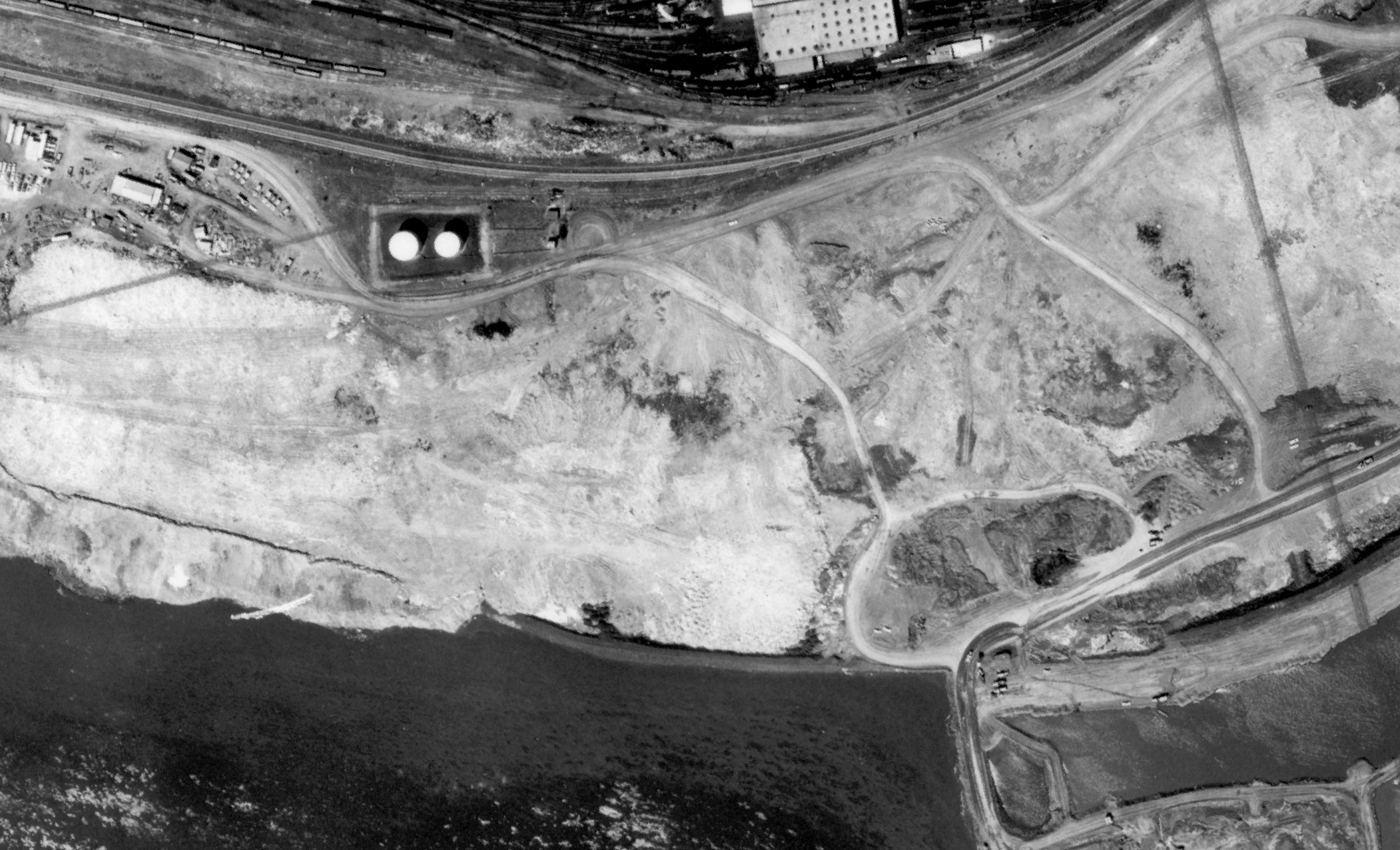
During the spring of 1966, the area is still used as a landfill.

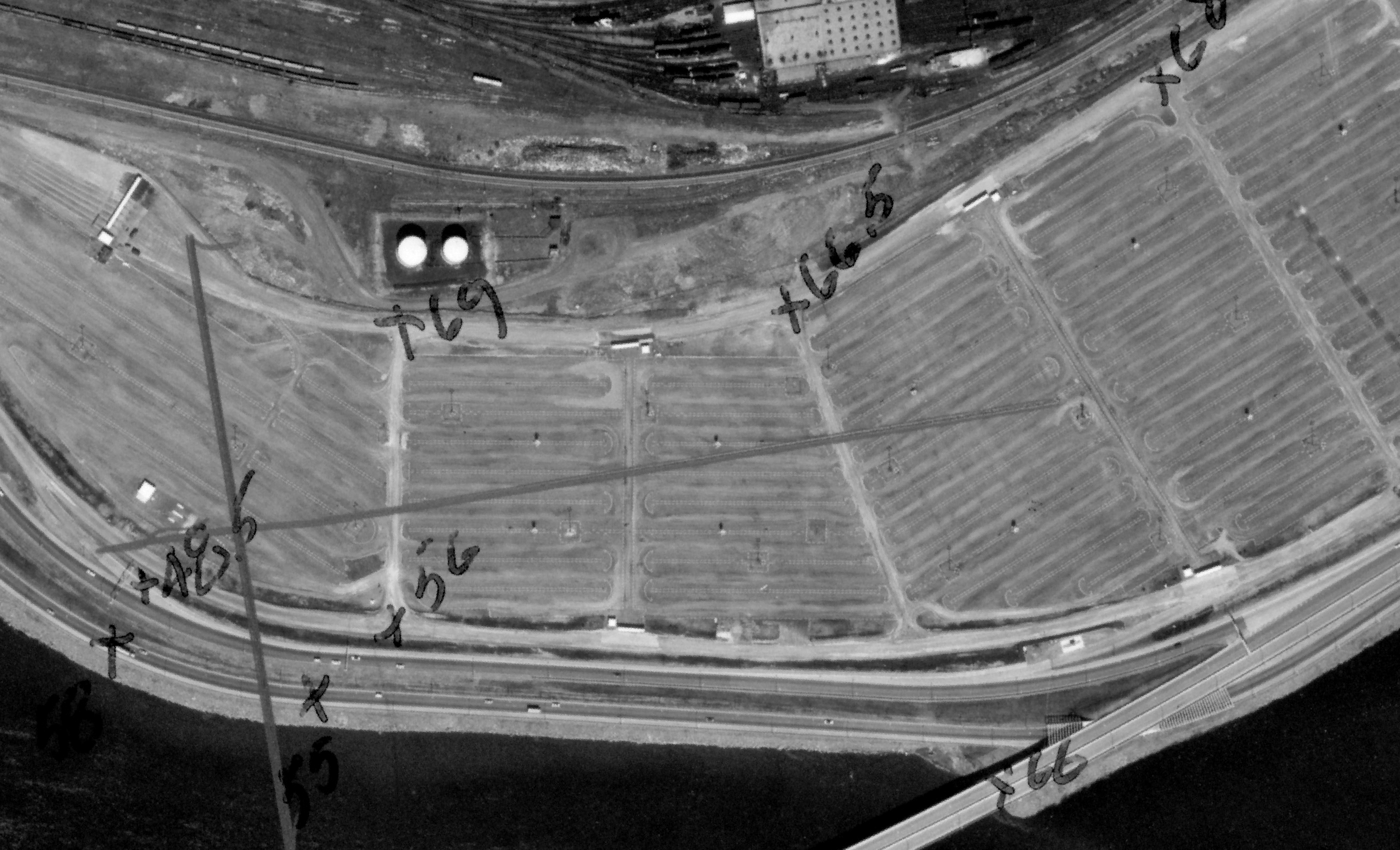
During the spring of 1968, the former parking lot for Expo 67 is now empty and unused

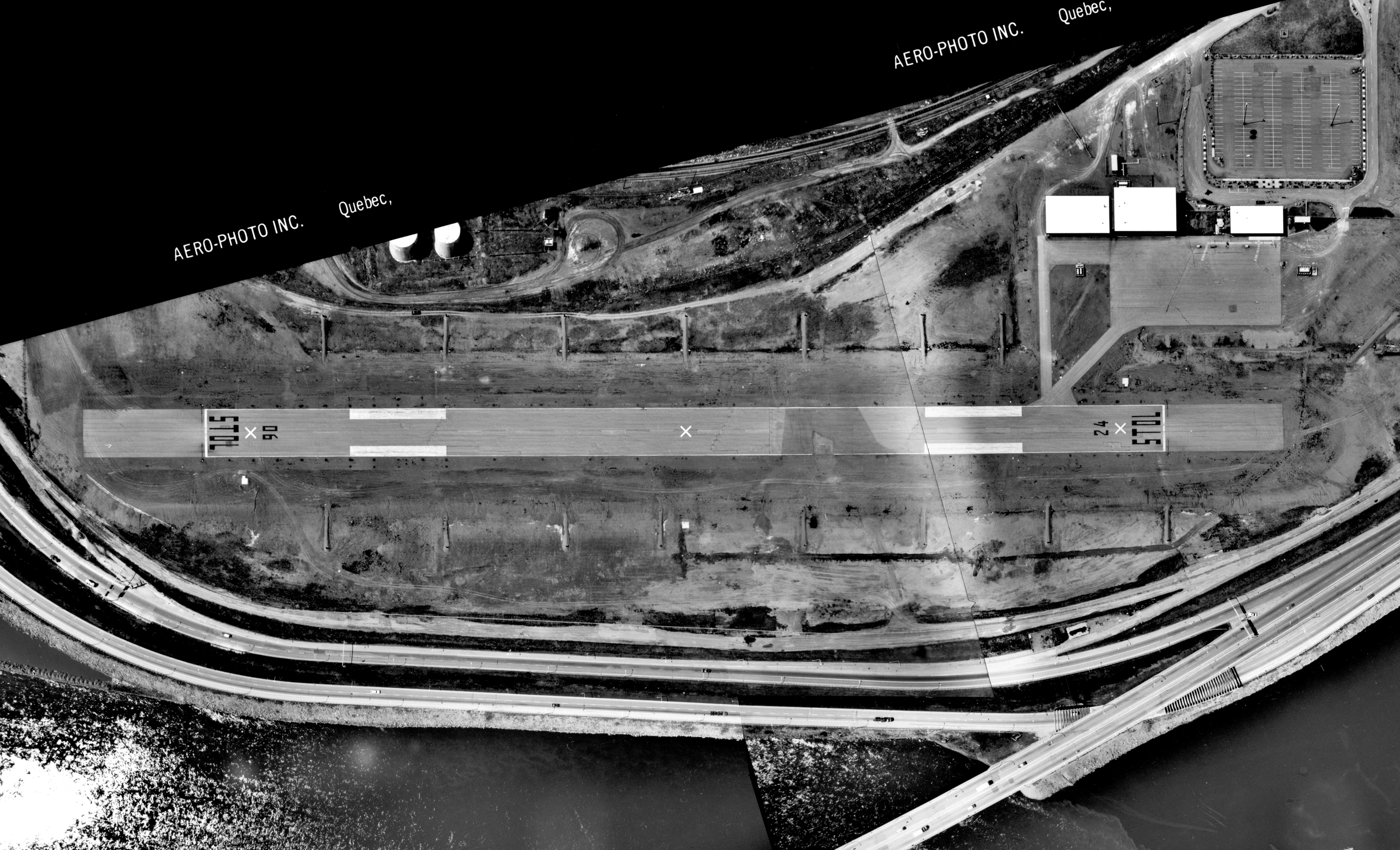
During the spring of 1977, the small airport is already abandoned.

== Infrastructure ==
The Montreal airport was equipped with a single asphalt runway 2,000 feet (610 meters) long and 100 feet (30 meters) wide, accommodating only short takeoff and landing (STOL) or vertical takeoff and landing (VTOL) aircraft. Hundreds of flares marked the runway, powered by a biogas recovery system that captured emissions from the former landfill beneath the facilities.

A taxiway connected the runway to the apron. Along the apron, built within the apron itself, were a maintenance and storage building, a hangar, and a control tower.

The airport had a small terminal building at the north end of the apron. This terminal was equipped with underfloor ventilation to prevent the accumulation of gases from the former landfill within the building. Outside, a 220-space parking lot was available free of charge to users. A drop-off area allowed passengers of the ADACmobile shuttle and taxis to board and disembark directly at the terminal. The parking lot, the terminal, and the tarmac were designed to minimize walking distances for users.
