= Ahuas =

- Municipality
- Location in Honduras
- Coordinates: 15°29′N 84°20′W
- Country: Honduras
- Department: Gracias a Dios
- Villages: 6

Area
  - Total: 1,800.63 km^{2} (695.23 sq mi)
- Elevation: 56 m (184 ft)

Population (2015)
  - Total: 8,387
  - Density: 4.658/km^{2} (12.06/sq mi)
- Time zone: UTC-6 (Central America)

Ahuas (Spanish pronunciation: [ˈawas]) is a municipality in the Honduran department of Gracias a Dios.

It is served by Ahuas Airport.

== Demographics ==
At the time of the 2013 Honduras census, Ahuas municipality had a population of 8,095. Of these, 94.46% were Indigenous (94.05% Miskito), 4.77% Mestizo, 0.42% Afro-Honduran or Black, 0.19% White and 0.16% others.

By 2018, the municipality had a population of 8,852 inhabitants, composed of 4,312 men and 4,540 women. Of the total population, 5,716 people lived in urban areas, while 3,136 resided in rural areas.
