= Victoria, Honduras =

Victoria
- Municipality
- Location in Honduras
- Coordinates: 14°56′18″N 087°23′33″W
- Country: Honduras
- Department: Yoro
- Villages: 19

Area
  - Total: 795.75 km^{2} (307.24 sq mi)
- Elevation: 383 m (1,255 ft)

Population (2015)
  - Total: 34,215
  - Density: 42.997/km^{2} (111.36/sq mi)
- Time zone: UTC-6 (Central America)

Victoria is a municipality in the Honduran department of Yoro.

It is served by Victoria Airport, a 700 metres (2,300 ft) grass airstrip.

== Demographics ==
At the time of the 2013 Honduras census, Victoria municipality had a population of 33,019. Of these, 88.60% were Mestizo, 7.14% Indigenous (6.69% Tolupan), 3.63% White, 0.61% Black or Afro-Honduran and 0.02% others.
