= Palmerola International Airport =

International airport serving Tegucigalpa, Honduras

Palmerola International Airport Aeropuerto Internacional Palmerola
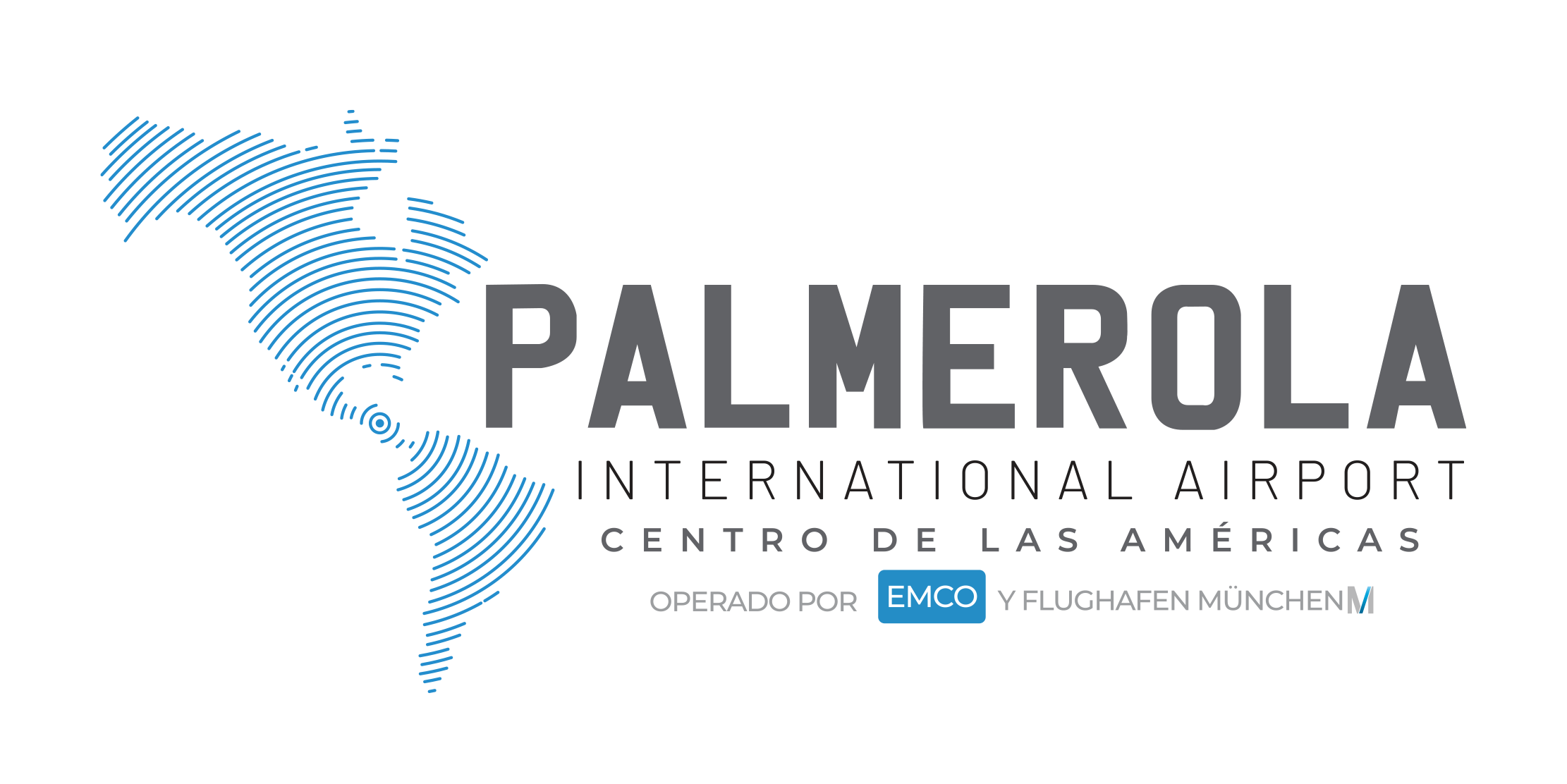

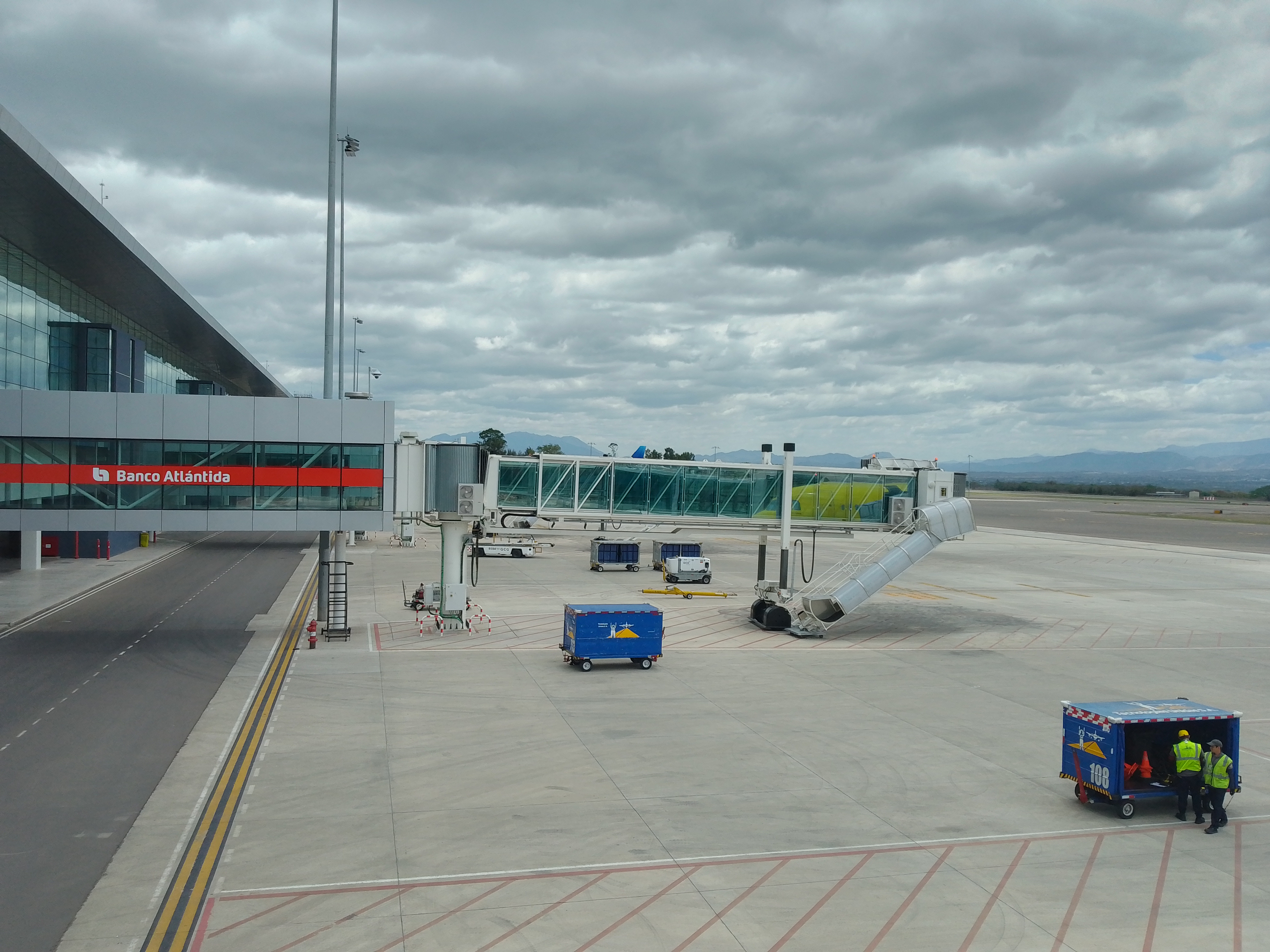
- IATA: XPL; ICAO: MHPR

Summary
- Airport type: Public / Military
- Serves: Tegucigalpa
- Location: Comayagua, Honduras
- Opened: 15 October 2021; 5 years ago
- Elevation AMSL: 628 m (2,060 ft)
- Coordinates: 14°22′57″N 087°37′16″W
- Website: palmerolaairport.com

Map
- Location in Honduras

Runways
Direction	Length		Surface
Direction	m	ft	Surface
17/35	2,440	8,005	Asphalt

Statistics (2025)
- Total Passengers: 970.349
- Source: Honduras AIP

Palmerola International Airport (IATA: XPL, ICAO: MHPR) — occasionally known as Comayagua International Airport — is an international airport serving Tegucigalpa, the capital of Honduras. Located in Comayagua, it is approximately 60 kilometres (37 miles) northwest of Tegucigalpa city centre. The airport was inaugurated in October 2021 as the country's new international airport for civil and commercial use, replacing the old Toncontín International Airport while it still remains active for domestic and regional flights. It was built at the facilities of the Soto Cano Air Base.

The airport is one of the most important airports in the country, and has a capacity greater than the Toncontin International Airport in Tegucigalpa. This airport serves not only Comayagua but also the residents of Tegucigalpa due to the limitations on growth of Toncontin. From October 2021, Comayagua became the main airport for the capital.

The airport has a capacity of 20 aircraft. The terminal is more than 39,000 square metres (420,000 sq ft) in size, approximately four times the size of Toncontin in Tegucigalpa. The airport has the third longest runway in Honduras after the Ramón Villeda Morales International Airport in San Pedro Sula and the Golosón International Airport in La Ceiba.

== History ==
=== Background ===
The Soto Cano Air Base, also known as Palmerola, is located 8 km (5.0 mi) south of the city of Comayagua and is the largest military base in Central America. The airbase was built by the United States between 1984 and 1985. It permanently houses some 1,800 US military personnel and is also the headquarters of the aviation academy of the Honduran Air Force.

According to plans by the Honduran government, the new international airport of Comayagua will serve both Comayagua and the capital, Tegucigalpa. The new international airport would replace the current Toncontin International Airport in Tegucigalpa for international flights. Due to its complicated topography, Toncontin is considered one of the most dangerous airports in the world, and its expansion is restricted due to its location in the centre of the city. With the opening of the new international airport, Toncontín would become an airport exclusively for domestic flights of small aircraft for up to 33 passengers.

=== Financing ===
The Honduran entrepreneur Lenir Pérez received the concession to build the airport from the Honduran government under the then President Juan Orlando Hernández (PNH). Lenir Pérez works in construction and mining in Honduras. In 2016, an agreement to build the airport as a public-private partnership was signed.

Its total cost was estimated at 163 million U.S. dollars. The private investor would contribute 87 million U.S. dollars, the Government of Spain would contribute 53 million U.S. dollars (45 million euros) through a reconversion of the pending debt from Honduras to Spain, and the Government of Honduras would contribute another 23 million U.S. dollars. The private investor will receive all the profits that the installation produces for three decades.

=== American military presence ===
Former Honduran President Manuel Zelaya had proposed to kick the US soldiers off the base and take control of it, but the proposal was criticized by the national and international press. With the arrival of President Juan Orlando Hernández, this plan was discarded and instead the construction of the airport was presented as a tool for mutual military development, with the participation of the United States Southern Command.

=== Inauguration ===
The new airport was inaugurated on October 15, 2021, in a ceremony presided over by president Hernández. Spirit Airlines landed from Houston on December 11, 2021, at 13:36 local time, making this the first commercial flight to land into the new facility. The 2nd flight was another from Miami, one hour later, also operated by Spirit. With the inauguration, the ICAO ID was changed from MHSC to MHPR.

== Construction phases ==
=== Phase 1 ===
The initial construction phase of the airport began on December 5, 2016. Months before, on March 31, 2016, the contract was signed between the Government of Honduras and the concessionaire to begin construction and manage future facilities.

Its initial phase in what constitutes the land side of the project included the construction of 755 metres (2500 ft) of access road and internal circulation circuit. Parking for 600 vehicle spaces for visitors, employees, buses and car rentals were built. Additionally, 10,500 square metres (113,000 sq ft) of air terminal and 2,500 square metres (27,000 sq ft) of cargo terminal were built.

On the air side, which is the side commonly known as the runway, 35,192 square metres (380,000 sq ft) of commercial platform and 8,820 square metres (95,000 sq ft) of cargo platform were built, which will be able to accommodate 4 commercial flights, with its 4 boarding bridges. To conclude this stage, 8,940 square metres (96,000 sq ft) of national aviation platform were built, which will have capacity for 6 aircraft.

The first construction phase was completed in 2021, and the new airport was inaugurated on October 15, 2021.

=== Phase 2 ===
The second construction phase will include the expansion of the ends of the air terminal, corresponding to 3,400 square metres (37,000 sq ft) of construction, expansion of the commercial and cargo platform to more than 12,700 square metres (140,000 sq ft); have 5 boarding bridges, an increase of 5,341 square metres (57,000 sq ft) in the national platform.

=== Future extensions ===
In its final state, the airport will have 13 boarding bridges, for an equal capacity of aircraft simultaneously.

== Passenger statistics ==
The airport has a capacity of up to 1.7 million passengers per year. It was forecast that in its first year in service, the airport would serve some 500,000 to 550,000 passengers annually, of which 350,000 to 400,000 would be for international flights and another 150,000 passengers for domestic flights. Annual passenger growth after its first year was predicted at 6% to 8%. An average of 1,500 passengers per day was forecast.

These forecasts, however, are from just before the COVID-19 pandemic began, which negatively affected the airline sector. In August 2020, the president of the Central American Bank for Economic Integration, Dante Mossi, said that the airport would serve to "revive the economy".

== Airlines and destinations ==
=== Passenger ===
Airlines	Destinations
Aeroméxico Connect	Mexico City–Benito Juárez
American Airlines	Dallas/Fort Worth, Miami
Avianca El Salvador	San Salvador
Copa Airlines	Panama City–Tocumen
Iberojet	Barcelona, Madrid
JetBlue	Fort Lauderdale (begins 25 February 2027)
United Airlines	Houston–Intercontinental

El Heraldo reported in January 2020 that flights to 14 countries were expected to be offered. The destinations would be to closer countries such as Belize, Canada, Costa Rica, El Salvador, Guatemala, Mexico, Panama, and the United States, but also to more distant countries in South America with destinations to Brazil, Chile, Colombia, and Peru. If there were flights to South America, it would be the only Honduran airport to offer it. As of 2023, the only flights to South America from this airport were offered to Colombia, however they have since been suspended.

In July 2021, the first airline and destinations that would operate from the new airport were announced: Spirit Airlines with destinations to Fort Lauderdale, Houston, and Miami. In August and September 2021, two additional airlines were announced that will fly to the airport - Aeroméxico Connect to Mexico City and Volaris El Salvador to San Salvador.

La Costeña and Transportes Aéreos Guatemaltecos have announced that they will transfer their operations from Toncontín International Airport to Palmerola International Airport, although the exact date of commencement of operations in Comayagua has not yet been announced.
