= Puerto Castilla, Honduras =

City in Honduras

Coordinates: 16°01′N 85°58′W

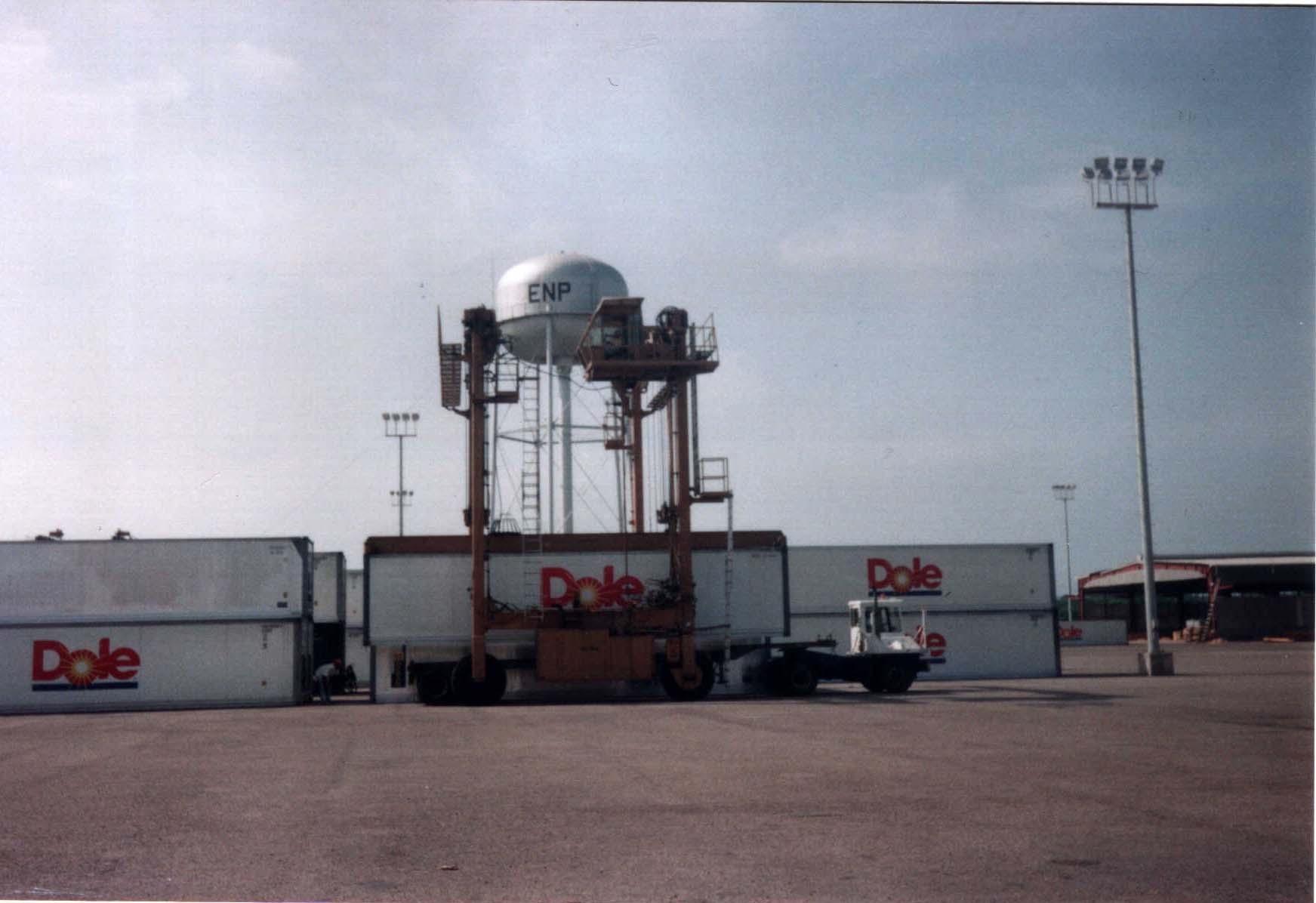
Dole Food Company activities in Puerto Castilla, July 1994.

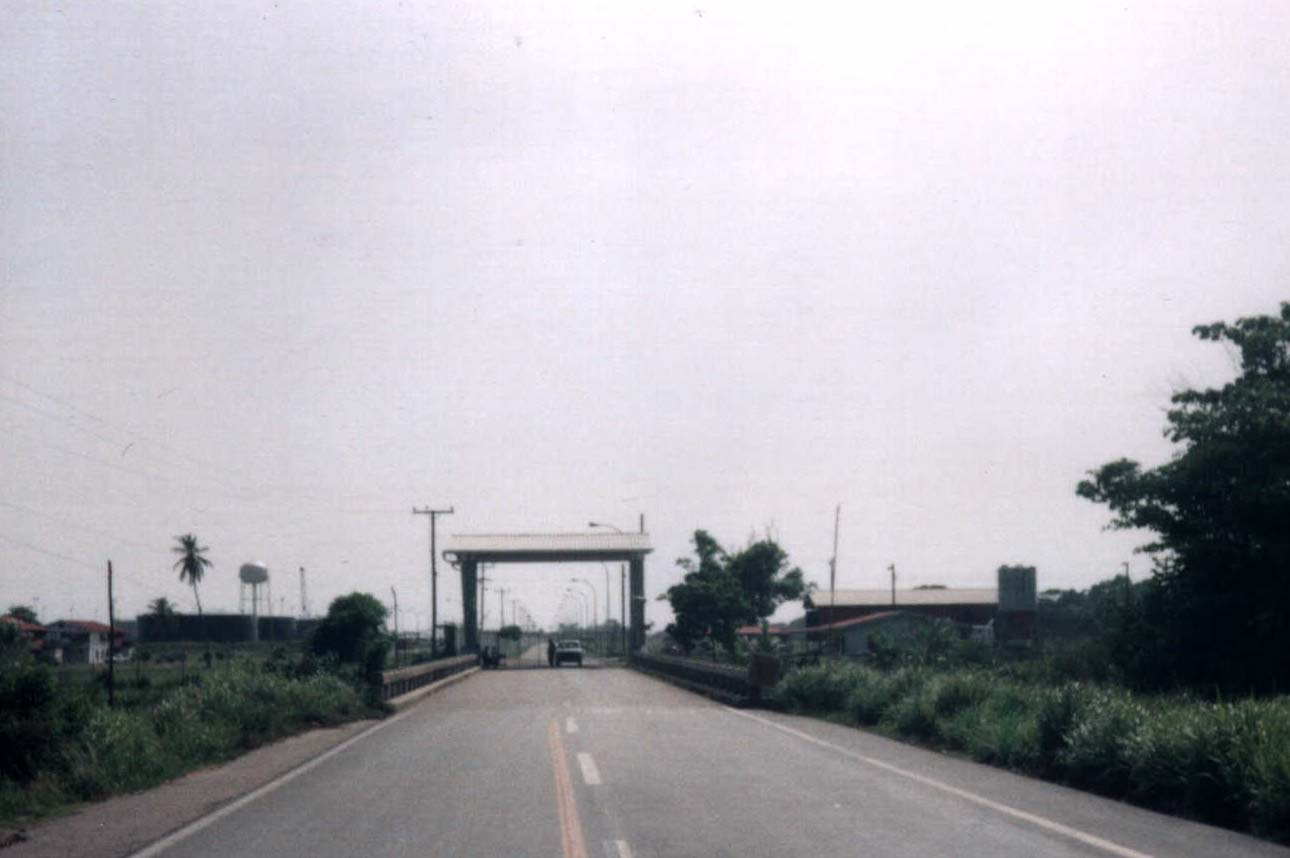
Entrance to the harbour of Puerto Castilla, July 1994.

Puerto Castilla is a village in the Colón Department of Honduras located approximately 20 kilometres (12 mi) north of Trujillo. This port city on the Caribbean Sea (Atlantic Ocean) was the one-time site of the United Fruit Company's Castilla Division which specialized in the growth, cultivation and shipments of the Gros Michel banana. This division was closed in the late 1930s as a result of "Panama disease", a blight on the roots of the banana.

The port city, and its population were moved east on the peninsula in the 1940s when a small naval base was established there for a PBY Catalina seaplane base. During World War II the seaplane base supported military operations including surveillance and security in conjunction with Guantanamo Bay, Cuba. It was believed that German naval forces planned an attack on the Panama Canal causing bases like Puerto Castilla and many others along the coast toward Panama to be on high alert. Puerto Castilla is now a native fishing village of about six hundred residents. West of the village the site of a Honduran naval base, as well as the site of a container port for Dole fresh fruit products. Vast African Oil Palm plantations now dot the area. Puerto Castilla lies on the south side of a peninsula sheltering Trujillo Bay. It is a deep-water port which has future possibility for development of a major port for the republic.

An original hospital building (recently renovated by the Honduran Navy for an educational center) and an old barracks are the last remaining evidence of the abandoned United Fruit presence.

A fence with guarded entrance now restricts casual traffic into the Port area, controlled by the Honduran Port Authority—ENP-Empresa Nacional Portuaria.

Leigh Richardson, a leading figure in the early Belizean independence movement, was born in Puerto Castilla in 1924.
