= Transport in Honduras =

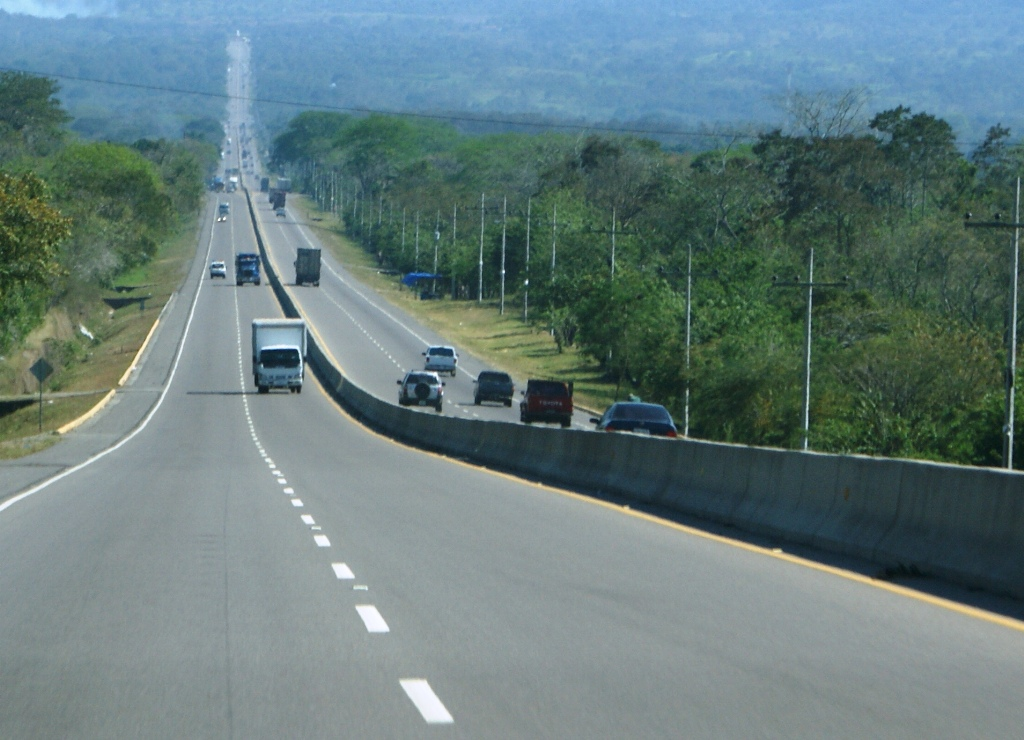
A highway in Honduras.

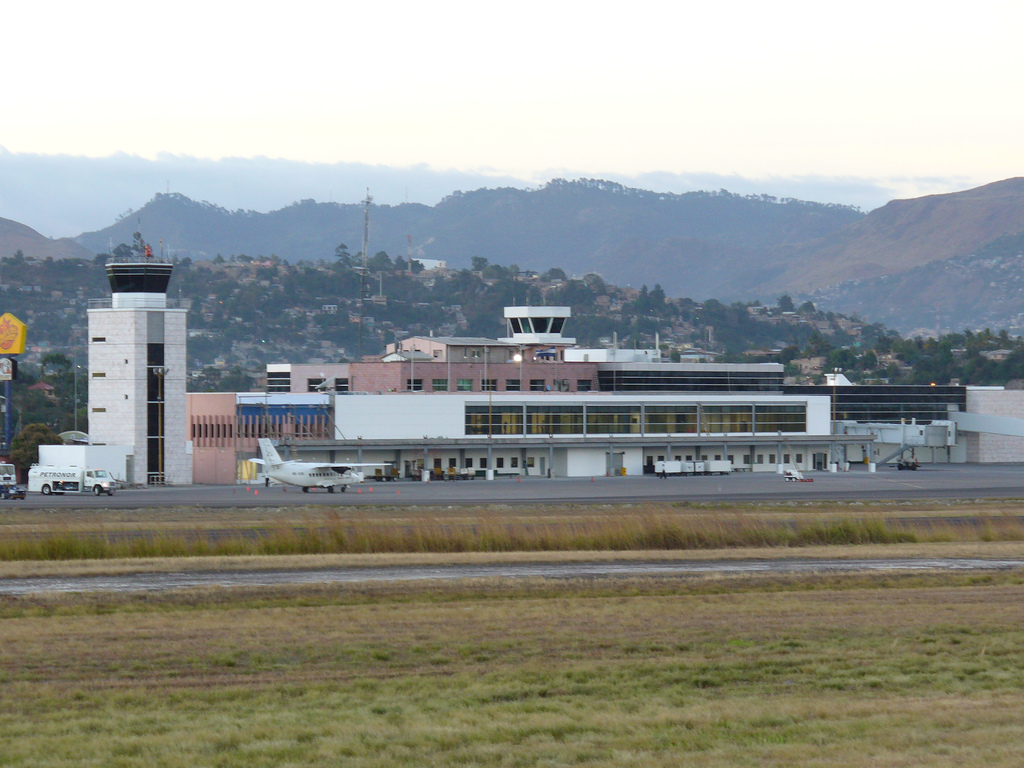
Toncontín Airport, Tegucigalpa.

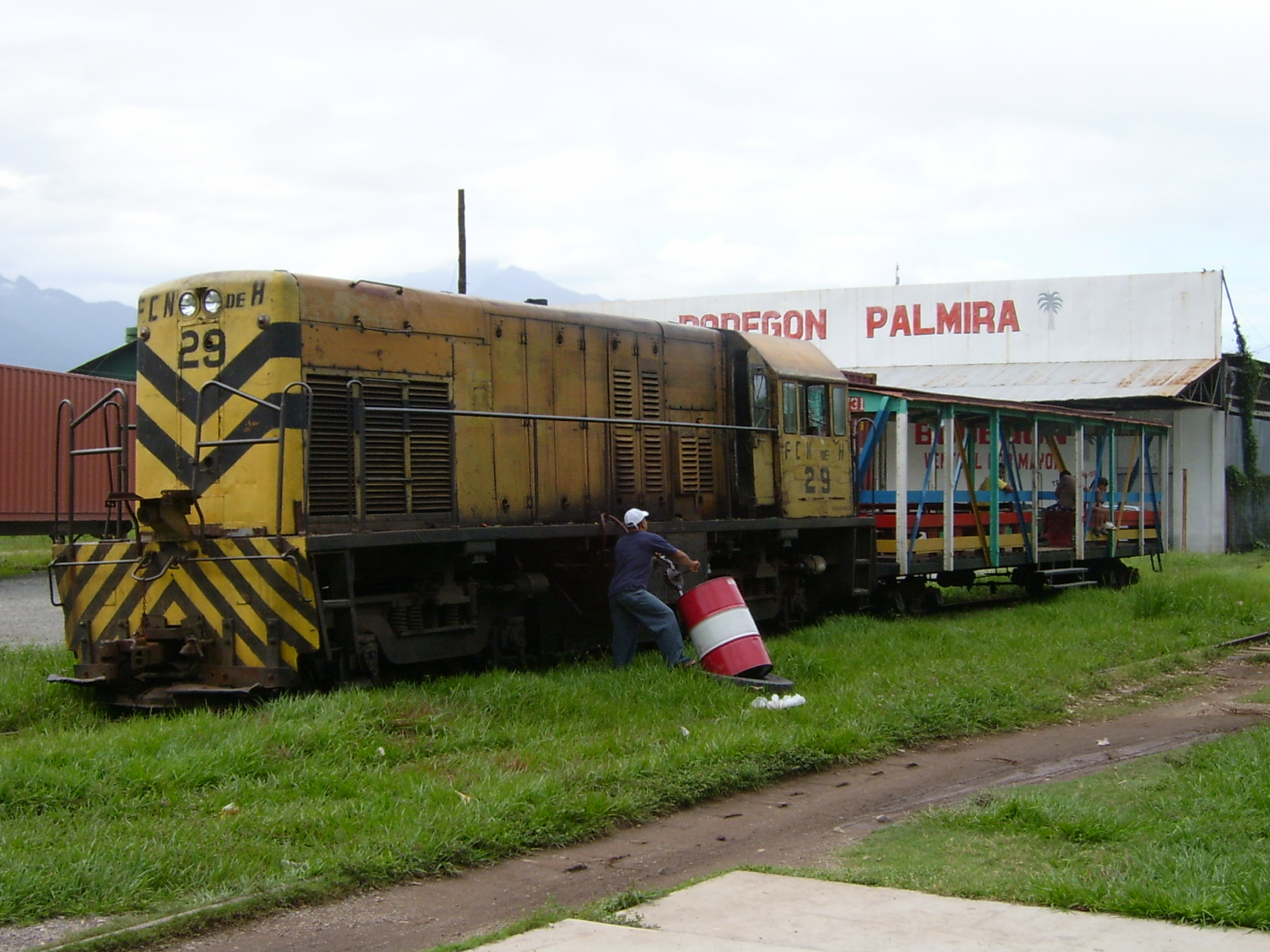
Passenger train in La Ceiba on January 11, 2005. Engineer tanks fuel manually from a barrel. Colorful passenger car (former box car without walls) is attached to the right.

Transport in Honduras refers to transport in Honduras, a country in Central America.

== Railways ==
Total: 699 km

- Narrow gauge: 349 km
- 3 ft 6 in (1,067 mm) gauge: 246 km
- 3 ft (914 mm) gauge

=== Railway links with adjacent countries ===
North to south:

- El Salvador — none
- Guatemala — none in use — break-of-gauge 914 mm (3 ft)/1,067 mm (3 ft 6 in) (?)
- Nicaragua — none

== Highways ==
Totals

- Paved: 3367 km
- Unpaved: 11357 km (2012 est.)

Double carriageway highways are slowly being developed in the main population areas in Honduras, however they are not traffic-selective and accept any kind of traffic, thus slowing the speed along them. The current ones are:

- San Pedro Sula - Puerto Cortés. Length: 56 km
- San Pedro Sula - El Progreso. Length: 27 km
- San Pedro Sula - Villanueva. Length: 24 km
- Tegucigalpa ring-road. Length: 27 km
- Tegucigalpa - Támara. Length: 23 km

== Waterways ==
465 km navigable by small craft, mainly along the Northern coast.

== Ports and harbors ==
=== Atlantic Ocean ===
- Puerto Cortés, pop. 44,696 hab., off San Pedro Sula
- Tela, pop. 28,335 hab.
- La Ceiba, pop. 114,584 hab.
- Puerto Castilla, off Trujillo
- Roatan, pop. 6,502 hab.

=== Pacific Ocean ===
- San Lorenzo, pop. 21,043 hab.

=== Other ===
- Puerto Lempira, pop. 4,102 hab.

== Merchant marine ==
Total: 306 ships (1,000 GT or over) totaling 848,150 GT/980,995 tonnes deadweight (DWT)

Ships by type (1999 est.):

- Bulk carriers: 26
- Cargo ships: 187
- Chemical tankers: 5
- Container ships: 7
- Livestock carrier: 1
- Passenger ships: 2
- Passenger/cargo ships: 4
- Petroleum tanker: 43
- Refrigerated cargo ships: 15
- Roll-on/roll-off: 9
- Short-sea passenger ships: 5
- Vehicle carriers: 2

Flags of convenience (1998 est.):

- North Korea owns 1 ship
- Russia, 6
- Singapore: 3
- Vietnam: 1

== Airports ==
Total: 119 (1999 est.)

- Main international airports: San Pedro Sula and Comayagua.
- Other international airports: Roatan and La Ceiba

=== Airports with paved runways ===
Total: 12

- 2438 to 3047 m: 3
- 1524 to 2437 m: 2
- 914 to 1523 m: 4
- Under 914 m: 3 (1999 est.)

=== Airports with unpaved runways ===
Total: 107

- 1524 to 2437 m: 2
- 914 to 1523 m: 21
- Under 84 m: 84 (1999 est.)
