= San Carlos Alzatate =

Coordinates: 14°30′N 90°04′W

- Municipality
- Interactive map of San Carlos Alzatate
- Country: Guatemala
- Department: Jalapa

Area
  - Total: 80.2 km^{2} (31.0 sq mi)

Population (2023)
  - Total: 22,264
  - Density: 278/km^{2} (719/sq mi)

San Carlos Alzatate is a municipality in the Jalapa Department of Guatemala. It covers an area of approximately 80.2 km^{2} (31.0 sq mi). As per 2023 estimates, it has a population of about 22,264 inhabitants.

== History ==
"Alzatate" is derived from Nahuatl and means "river heron". The region was inhabited by indigenous Pipil and Poqomam people before the Spanish colonization. The settlement was formed when the indigenous people settled in the region to escape enslavement during the Colonial rule.

Initially, it was part of the Potrero Grande hacienda, in the department of Santa Rosa. It was known as Santa Cruz Alzatate, and was renamed as San Raymundo Alzatate in honor of Raymond of Peñafort. In 1938, it was renamed as San Carlos Alzatate, as it is currently known.

== Geography ==
San Carlos Alzatate is one of the seven municipalities in the department of Jalapa in Guatemala. It occupies an area of 80.2 km^{2} (31.0 sq mi). It is located about 126 km (78 mi) from the national capital Guatemala City and 37 km (23 mi) from the departmental seat of Jalapa. It borders the municipalities of Jalapa to the north, Casillas, San Rafael Las Flores and Jutiapa to the south, and Mataquescuintla and San Rafael Las Flores to the west.

Located at an elevation of 1,379.63 m (4,526.3 ft) above sea level, the municipality has a tropical monsoon climate (Köppen classification: Am). The average annual temperature is 20 °C (68 °F). It receives about 138.83 mm (5.466 in) of rainfall annually and has an average of 182.22 rainy days per year.

== Demographics ==
San Carlos Alzatate had an estimated population of 22,264 inhabitants in 2023. The population consisted of 11,121 males and 11,143 females. About 34.8% of the population was below the age of fourteen, and 6.7% was over the age of 65 years. About 46.9% of the population was classified as rural, while 53.1% lived in urban areas. Most residents (94.8%) were born in the same municipality.

Xinca (92.2%) formed the predominant ethnic group, with Ladino (5.9%) forming a minor group. Spanish (99.1%) is the most widely spoken language. The literacy rate is about 80.7%.
