= Municipalities of Guatemala =

Administrative division

Guatemala's municipalities in their departments

The departments of the Republic of Guatemala are divided into 340 municipalities (Spanish: municipios). The municipalities are listed below, by department. Department capitals are written in bold.

== Alta Verapaz ==
N.	Municipalities	Area (km^{2})	Population (2018)	Density
1	Chahal	336	29 590	88.07
2	Chisec	1 103	106 084	62.85
3	**Cobán**	2 132	228 664	107.25
4	Fray Bartolomé de las Casas	1 135	77 896	63 38
5	Santa Catalina la Tinta	85	45 752	536.88
6	Lanquín	208	26 551	127.65
7	Panzós	638	81 063	127.06
8	Raxruhá	533	40 094	75.22
9	San Cristóbal Verapaz	192	80 613	419.86
10	San Juan Chamelco	180	61 634	342.41
11	San Pedro Carchá	1 082	255 002	235.68
12	Santa Cruz Verapaz	48	35 878	747.46
13	Cahabón	900	70 321	78.13
14	Senahú	336	98 703	293.76
15	Tamahú	125	24 444	195.55
16	Tactic	85	38 052	447.67
17	Tucurú	96	50 971	530.95
	Alta Verapaz	8 700	1 351 312	155.28

== Baja Verapaz ==
N.	Municipalities	Area (km^{2})	Population (2018)	Density
1	Cubulco	444	60 706	136.73
2	Granados	258	14 585	58.81
3	Purulhá	248	65 340	253.47
4	Rabinal	504	45 000	89.29
5	**Salamá**	776	71 478	92.11
6	San Jerónimo	475	28 321	59.62
7	San Miguel Chicaj	300	36 845	122.82
8	Santa Cruz el Chol	140	10 445	74.61
	Baja Verapaz	3 145	332 720	105.79

== Chimaltenango ==
N.	Municipalities	Area (km^{2})	Population (2018)	Density
1	**Chimaltenango**	86	116 642	1356.3
2	San José Poaquíl	100	33 932	339.32
3	San Martín Jilotepeque	251	94 901	378.09
4	San Juan Comalapa	76	60 834	800.45
5	Santa Apolonia	96	23 751	247.71
6	Tecpán Guatemala	201	112 864	561.51
7	Patzún	124	71 790	578.95
8	Pochuta	170	11 239	428.66
9	Patzicía	44	40 848	928.36
10	Santa Cruz Balanyá	40	10 981	274.53
11	Acatenango	172	28 780	167.33
12	San Pedro Yepocapa	217	42 996	198.14
13	San Andrés Itzapa	83	35 579	428.66
14	Parramos	16	20 632	1289.5
15	Zaragoza	56	29 668	529.79
16	El Tejar	144	19 492	165.14
	Chimaltenango	1 876	754 929	402.41

== Chiquimula ==
N.	Municipalities	Area (km^{2})	Population (2018)	Density
1	Camotán	232	61 958	267.06
2	**Chiquimula**	372	120 384	214.56
3	Concepción Las Minas	225	12 615	56.07
4	Esquipulas	532	56 253	118
5	Ipala	228	24 024	105.37
6	Jocotán	148	75 578	510.66
7	Olopa	156	30 534	195.73
8	Quetzaltepeque	236	30 136	30 136
9	San Jacinto	60	13 381	223.02
10	San José la Arada	160	9 249	57.81
11	San Juan Ermita	92	18 751	203.82
	Chiquimula	2 441	452 863	185.52

== El Progreso ==
N.	Municipalities	Area (km^{2})	Population (2018)	Density
1	El Jícaro	249	13 518	54.29
2	**Guastatoya**	182	27 407	150.59
3	Morazán	329	12 672	38.52
4	San Agustín Acasaguastlán	358	55 508	154.19
5	San Antonio La Paz	209	22 493	107.62
6	San Cristóbal Acasaguastlán	124	7 979	64.35
7	Sanarate	273	42 422	155.39
8	Sansare	118	13 674	115.88
	El Progreso	1 844	195 673	106.11

== Escuintla ==
N.	Municipalities	Area (km^{2})	Population (2018)	Density
1	**Escuintla**	332	170 280	512.89
2	Guanagazapa	220	17 485	79.35
3	Iztapa	328	20 401	
4	La Democracia	321	22 884	71.29
5	La Gomera	640	53 211	83.14
6	Masagua	473	48 552	102.65
7	Nueva Concepción	555	82 216	156.88
8	Palín	92	72 203	784.02
9	San José	220	68 331	310.6
10	San Vicente Pacaya	236	18 417	78.04
11	Santa Lucía Cotzumalguapa	432	127 683	295.56
12	Sipacate	265	18 212	68.72
13	Siquinalá	184	26 317	143.03
14	Tiquisate	471	63 971	135.82
	Escuintla	4 769	810 163	169.88

== Guatemala ==
N.	Municipalities	Area (km^{2})	Population (2018)	Density
1	Amatitlán	204	152 296	746.55
2	Chinautla	80	124 365	1 554.56
3	Chuarrancho	98	17 057	162.45
4	**Ciudad de Guatemala**	220	995 363	4 524.37
5	Fraijanes	96	63 721	667.38
6	Mixco	132	517 505	3 920.49
7	Palencia	196	74 839	381.83
8	San José del Golfo	84	8 456	100.67
9	San José Pinula	220	89 636	407.45
10	San Juan Sacatepéquez	293	284 798	972
11	San Miguel Petapa	20	150 513	5 017.1
12	San Pedro Ayampuc	73	67 946	930.77
13	San Pedro Sacatepéquez	148	56 545	382.06
14	San Raymundo	114	38 891	341.15
15	Santa Catarina Pinula	50	87 362	1 747.24
16	Villa Canales	353	167 779	475.29
17	Villa Nueva	114	483 897	4 244.71
	Guatemala	2 495	3 380 969	1 355.09

== Huehuetenango ==
N.	Municipalities	Area (km^{2})	Population (2018)	Density
1	Aguacatán	300	59 638	198.79
2	Chiantla	493	93 780	190.22
3	Colotenango	71	44 823	631.31
4	Concepción Huista	136	21 208	155.94
5	Cuilco	592	67 297	113.68
6	**Huehuetenango**	204	136 639	669.8
7	Jacaltenango	212	44 605	210.4
8	La Democracia	136	61 486	452.1
9	La Libertad	104	49 035	471.49
10	Malacatancito	268	22 589	85.29
11	Nentón	787	51 349	65.25
12	Petatán	17	7 138	428.19
13	San Antonio Huista	156	19 311	123.79
14	San Gaspar Ixchil	31	10 581	341.32
15	San Ildefonso Ixtahuacán	184	56 511	307.13
16	San Juan Atitán	64	26 031	406.73
17	San Juan Ixcoy	224	31 081	138.75
18	San Mateo Ixtatán	560	60 203	107.51
19	San Miguel Acatán	152	36 245	238.45
20	San Pedro Nécta	119	41 562	349.26
21	San Pedro Soloma	264	64 772	245.35
22	San Rafael La Independencia	64	18 733	292.7
23	San Rafael Pétzal	25	12 786	551.44
24	San Sebastián Coatán	168	25 935	154.38
25	San Sebastián Huehuetenango	108	43 261	400.56
26	Santa Ana Huista	145	10 687	73.7
27	Santa Bárbara	132	44 809	339.46
28	Santa Cruz Barillas	1 112	127 991	115.1
29	Santa Eulalia	292	51 910	177.77
30	Santiago Chimaltenango	39	14 631	375.15
31	Tectitán	68	11 928	175.41
32	Todos Santos Cuchumatán	269	39 638	147.35
33	Unión Cantinil	43	18 367	427.14
	Huehuetenango	7 539	1 426 560	189.22

== Izabal ==
N.	Municipalities	Area (km^{2})	Population (2018)	Density
1	El Estor	2 896	82 491	28.48
2	Livingston	1 940	80 249	41.37
3	Los Amates	1 615	65 475	40.54
4	Morales	1 295	107 400	82.93
5	**Puerto Barrios**	1 292	110 846	85.79
	Izabal	9 038	446 461	49.61

== Jalapa ==
N.	Municipalities	Area (km^{2})	Population (2018)	Density
1	**Jalapa**	544	192 676	354.18
2	Mataquescuintla	287	47 280	164.74
3	Monjas	256	31 330	122.38
4	San Carlos Alzatate	25	21 938	1 277.52
5	San Luis Jilotepeque	296	26 874	90.79
6	San Manuel Chaparrón	123	9 126	74.20
7	San Pedro Pinula	532	78 244	147.08
	Jalapa	2 063	407 468	197.51

== Jutiapa ==
N.	Municipalities	Area (km^{2})	Population (2018)	Density
1	Agua Blanca	340	17 765	52.25
2	Asunción Mita	506	53 141	105.02
3	Atescatempa	68	20 033	294.6
4	Comapa	132	37 218	281.95
5	Conguaco	128	29 887	233.49
6	El Adelanto	31	8 394	270.77
7	El Progreso	68	25 689	257.56
8	Jalpatagua	204	31 601	154.91
9	Jerez	60	6 903	115.05
10	**Jutiapa**	620	167 049	269.43
11	Moyuta	380	50 742	133.43
12	Pasaco	308	11 229	36.46
13	Quesada	84	23 822	104.94
14	San José Acatempa	68	13 938	204.97
15	Santa Catarina Mita	132	31 709	240.22
16	Yupiltepeque	35	18 262	507.28
17	Zapotitlán	84	10 573	125.87
	Jutiapa	3 248	557 955	171.78

== Petén ==
N.	Municipalities	Area (km^{2})	Population (2018)	Density
1	Dolores	3 050	30 302	9.94
2	El Chal	958	15 555	16.24
3	**Flores**	4 348	88 000	20.23
4	La Libertad	5 272	86 171	16.35
5	Las Cruces	1 775	39 188	22.32
6	Melchor de Mencos	2 098	30 682	14.62
7	Poptún	1 766	69 437	39.42
8	San Andrés	8 874	35 465	4
9	San Benito	112	54 189	483.84
10	San Francisco	320	16 787	52.46
11	San José	2 252	7 261	3.22
12	San Luis	2 913	77 395	26.51
13	Santa Ana	1 008	24 380	24.19
14	Sayaxché	3 904	99 787	25.56
	Petén	38 650	674 599	17.45

== Quetzaltenango ==
N.	Municipalities	Area (km^{2})	Population (2018)	Density
1	Almolonga	20	17 305	865.25
2	Cabricán	60	28 124	468.73
3	Cajolá	36	19 333	537.03
4	Cantel	22	47 087	2 140.32
5	Coatepeque	426	120 737	283.42
6	Colomba Costa Cuca	212	56 487	266.45
7	Concepción Chiquirichapa	48	20 920	435.83
8	El Palmar	171	31 706	185.41
9	Flores Costa Cuca	63	24 888	395.05
10	Génova	372	46 294	118.10
11	Huitán	16	14 839	927.44
12	La Esperanza	32	24 948	779.63
13	Olintepeque	36	39 383	1 093.97
14	Palestina de Los Altos	22	20 719	941.77
15	**Quetzaltenango**	120	204 075	1 700.63
16	Salcajá	12	21 577	1 798.08
17	San Carlos Sija	148	36 001	243.25
18	San Francisco La Unión	32	9 665	302.03
19	San Juan Ostuncalco	109	61 517	564.38
20	San Martín Sacatepéquez	100	33 826	338.26
21	San Mateo	20	8 946	447.30
22	San Miguel Sigüilá	28	9 869	352.46
23	Sibilia	28	9 071	323.96
24	Zunil	92	15 893	172.75
	Quetzaltenango	2 225	923 910	415.24

== Quiché ==
N.	Municipalities	Area (km^{2})	Population (2018)	Density
1	Canillá	123	12 724	103.45
2	Chajul	715	52 019	72.75
3	Chicamán	516	43 139	83.60
4	Chiché	144	32 271	224.10
5	Santo Tomás Chichicastenango	400	150 932	377.33
6	Chinique	64	13 547	211.67
7	Cunén	195	47 250	242.30
8	Ixcán	1 693	109 372	64.60
9	Joyabaj	338	107 634	354.06
10	Nebaj	600	77 377	128.96
11	Pachalum	100	9 897	98.97
12	Patzité	64	7 787	121.67
13	Sacapulas	295	55 398	187.78
14	San Andrés Sajcabajá	446	27 962	62.70
15	San Antonio Ilotenango	80	30 864	385.80
16	San Bartolomé Jocotenango	123	15 777	128.27
17	San Juan Cotzal	228	36 298	159.20
18	San Pedro Jocopilas	578	37 990	65.73
19	**Santa Cruz del Quiché**	271	99 749	368.07
20	Uspantán	865	74 244	85.83
21	Zacualpa	336	40 003	119.06
	Quiché	8 174	1 082 234	132.39

== Retalhuleu ==
N.	Municipalities	Area (km^{2})	Population (2018)	Density
1	Champerico	361	38 570	106.82
2	El Asintal	112	43 281	386.43
3	Nuevo San Carlos	64	41 956	655.56
4	**Retalhuleu**	796	109 935	138.11
5	San Andrés Villa Seca	254	56 050	220.71
6	San Felipe	32	26 640	832.5
7	San Martín Zapotitlán	24	13 094	545.58
8	San Sebastián	28	30 724	1 097.29
9	Santa Cruz Muluá	128	16 138	126.08
	Retalhuleu	1 800	376 388	209.10

== Sacatepéquez ==
#	Municipality	Population (2018)	Density (/km²)	Area (km^{2})
1	Antigua	46,054	667/km^{2}	69
2	Sumpango	37,260	601/km^{2}	62
3	Ciudad Vieja	33,405	1,237/km^{2}	27
4	Santiago Sacatepéquez	29,238	812/km^{2}	36
5	San Lucas Sacatepéquez	23,986	959/km^{2}	25
6	Alotenango	23,369	615/km^{2}	38
7	Santa María de Jesús	21,938	954/km^{2}	23
8	Jocotenango	21,657	2,166/km^{2}	10
9	Pastores	17,814	938/km^{2}	19
10	Santa Lucía Milpas Altas	15,570	819/km^{2}	19
11	San Miguel Dueñas	12,696	282/km^{2}	45
12	Santo Domingo Xenacoj	12,402	653/km^{2}	19
14	Magdalena Milpas Altas	11,856	624/km^{2}	19
13	San Antonio Aguas Calientes	11,347	1,621/km^{2}	7
15	San Bartolomé Milpas Altas	7,816	1,563/km^{2}	5
16	Santa Catarina Barahona	4,061	131/km^{2}	31
	Sacatepéquez	330,469	725/km²	454 km^{2}

== San Marcos ==
N.	Municipalities	Area (km^{2})	Population (2018)	Density
1	Ayutla	125	45 401	363.10
2	Catarina	76	35 542	467.66
3	Comitancillo	138	80 612	584.14
4	Concepción Tutuapa	176	84 138	478.06
5	El Quetzal	88	25 888	294.18
6	El Tumbador	84	52 144	620.76
7	Esquipulas Palo Gordo	21	14 018	667.52
8	Ixchiguán	184	24 926	135.47
9	La Blanca	96	34 307	357.36
10	La Reforma	100	23 717	237.17
11	Malacatán	204	109 318	535.87
12	Nuevo Progreso	140	31 968	228.34
13	Ocós	75	12 776	170.35
14	Pajapita	84	23 171	275.85
15	Río Blanco	36	6 085	169.03
16	San Antonio Sacatepéquez	79	20 994	265.75
17	San Cristóbal Cucho	58	17 987	310.12
18	San José El Rodeo	81	19 401	239.52
19	San José Ojetenam	37	22 768	615.35
20	San Lorenzo	25	14 085	563.40
21	**San Marcos**	121	49 115	405.91
22	San Miguel Ixtahuacán	184	52 452	285.07
23	San Pablo	124	52 217	421.10
24	San Pedro Sacatepéquez	253	85 671	338.62
25	San Rafael Pie de la Cuesta	60	18 532	305.87
26	Sibinal	176	17 069	96.98
27	Sipacapa	152	27 270	179.41
28	Tacaná	302	82 079	271.78
29	Tajumulco	300	63 405	211.35
30	Tejutla	142	44 416	312.79
	San Marcos	3 721	1 191 742	320.27

== Santa Rosa ==
N.	Municipalities	Area (km^{2})	Population (2018)	Density
1	Barberena	294	61 079	207.75
2	Casillas	185	27 601	140.86
3	Chiquimulilla	499	64 871	130.00
4	**Cuilapa**	365	46 974	128.70
5	Guazacapán	172	22 197	129.05
6	Nueva Santa Rosa	67	39 286	586.36
7	Oratorio	214	27 115	126.71
8	Pueblo Nuevo Viñas	290	29 418	101.44
9	San Juan Tecuaco	80	12 825	160.31
10	San Rafael las Flores	84	13 850	164.88
11	Santa Cruz Naranjo	58	17 875	308.72
12	Santa María Ixhuatán	113	26 721	236.47
13	Santa Rosa de Lima	134	21 415	159.58
14	Taxisco	428	36 750	85.86
	Santa Rosa	2 983	447 977	150.17

== Sololá ==
N.	Municipalities	Area (km^{2})	Population (2018)	Density
1	Concepción	40	7 214	180.35
2	Nahualá	218	87 319	400.55
3	Panajachel	22	16 101	731.86
4	San Andrés Semetabaj	48	14 681	305.85
5	San Antonio Palopó	34	15 752	463.29
6	San José Chacayá	44	5 220	118.64
7	San Juan La Laguna	38	13 400	350.97
8	San Lucas Tolimán	116	31 805	274.18
9	San Marcos La Laguna	12	2 944	245.33
10	San Pablo La Laguna	12	8 004	667
11	San Pedro La Laguna	24	11 828	492.83
12	Santa Catarina Ixtahuacán	218	61 274	281.07
13	Santa Catarina Palopó	8	4 882	610.25
14	Santa Clara La Laguna	12	10 390	865.83
15	Santa Cruz La Laguna	12	7 894	657.83
16	Santa Lucía Utatlán	44	21 790	495.23
17	Santa María Visitación	23	2 602	216.83
18	Santiago Atitlán	136	44 854	329.81
19	**Sololá**	94	99 934	1063.12
	Sololá	1 155	467 888	405.09

== Suchitepéquez ==
N.	Municipalities	Area (km^{2})	Population (2018)	Density
1	Chicacao	216	67 399	312.03
2	Cuyotenango	93	37 785	408.49
3	**Mazatenango**	356	88 828	235.47
4	Patulul	332	42 394	127.69
5	Pueblo Nuevo	24	12 111	504.63
6	Río Bravo	302	31 303	103.65
7	Samayac	16	26 665	1666.56
8	San Antonio Suchitepéquez	64	65 50|	1023.45
9	San Bernardino	32	17 110	534.69
10	San Francisco Zapotitlán	60	24 763	412.72
11	San Gabriel	16	8 082	505.13
12	San José El Ídolo	88	12 017	136.56
13	San José La Máquina	147	26 062	177.29
14	San Juan Bautista	52	9 404	180.65
15	San Lorenzo	60	13 930	232.17
16	San Miguel Panán	40	12 475	311.88
17	San Pablo Jocopilas	26	22 490	865.00
18	Santa Bárbara	125	27 708	221.66
19	Santo Domingo Suchitepéquez	242	48 825	201.76
20	Santo Tomás La Unión	80	12 800	160.00
21	Zunilito	56	8 888	158.71
	Suchitepéquez	2 427	557 589	229.74

== Totonicapán ==
N.	Municipalities	Area (km^{2})	Population (2018)	Density
1	Momostenango	305	139 552	457.55
2	San Andrés Xecul	17	29 849	1 755.82
3	San Bartolo	8	12 459	1 557.38
4	San Cristóbal Totonicapán	36	36 119	1003.31
5	San Francisco El Alto	132	65 521	496.37
6	Santa Lucía La Reforma	136	25 668	188.74
7	Santa María Chiquimula	212	58 865	278.28
8	**Totonicapán**	328	118 960	362.68
	Totonicapán	1 174	486 993	414.81

== Zacapa ==
N.	Municipalities	Area (km^{2})	Population (2018)	Density
1	Cabañas	136	14 817	108.95
2	Estanzuela	94	10 872	115.41
3	Gualán	696	49 709	71.42
4	Huité	89	12 021	23.25
5	La Unión	214	38 473	179.79
6	Río Hondo	422	23 384	55.41
7	San Diego	104	7 732	74.59
8	San Jorge	82	18 000	219.51
9	Teculután	211	20 272	96.08
10	Usumatlán	257	13 245	51.54
11	**Zacapa**	517	66 423	128.47
	Zacapa	2 822	274 948	97.43
