= Xinca people =

Xinka (Xinca)
- Xinca people in Cuilapa, Guatemala

Total population
- 264,167

Regions with significant populations
- Guatemala Southeastern departments of Jutiapa, Jalapa, and Santa Rosa: 264,167

Languages
- Spanish, formerly Xincan languages

Religion
- Catholicism, evangelism, indigenous religion

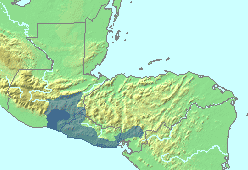
Extent of Xinca languages (now extinct)

The Xinka, or Xinca, are a non-Mayan Indigenous people of Mesoamerica, with communities in the southern portion of Guatemala, near its border with El Salvador, and in the mountainous region to the north. Their languages (the Xincan languages) are not known to be related to any other language family, although they have many loan words from Mayan languages. The Xinka may have been among the earliest inhabitants of southeastern Guatemala, predating the arrival of the Maya and the Pipil.

== Population ==
In the 2018 National Census, a total of 264,167 individuals identified themselves as Xinka, representing 1.8% of the national population. After a revivalist movement led by the two main Xinka political organizations in Guatemala, self identified Xincas increased from 16,214 individuals in 2002 to 264,167 in 2018.

== History ==
Before the arrival of the Spanish in the early 16th century, the eastern portion of the Guatemalan Pacific plain was occupied by the Pipil and the Xinca. The main Xinca territory lay to the east of the main Pipil population in what is now Santa Rosa Department; there were also Xinca in Jutiapa Department.

In Guazacapán, now a municipality in Santa Rosa, Pedro de Alvarado described his encounter with people who were neither Maya nor Pipil, speaking a different language altogether; these people were probably Xinca. At this point Alvarado's force consisted of 250 Spanish infantry accompanied by 6,000 indigenous allies, mostly Kaqchikel and Cholultec. Alvarado and his army defeated and occupied the most important Xinca city, named as Atiquipaque, usually considered to be in the Taxisco area. The defending warriors were described by Alvarado as engaging in fierce hand-to-hand combat using spears, stakes and poisoned arrows. The battle took place on 26 May 1524 and resulted in a significant reduction of the Xinca population.

After the conquest of the Pacific plain, the inhabitants paid tribute to the Spanish in the form of valuable products such as cacao, cotton, salt and vanilla, with an emphasis upon cacao.

Many of the people were forced into slavery and compelled to participate in the conquest of modern-day El Salvador. It is from this that the names for the town, river, and bridge "Los Esclavos" (The Slaves) are derived in the area of Cuilapa, Santa Rosa.

After 1575, the process of Xinka cultural extinction accelerated, mainly due to their exportation to other regions. This also contributed to a decrease in the number of Xinka-language speakers. One of the oldest references concerning this language was presented by the archbishop Pedro Cortés y Larraz during a visit to the diocese of Taxisco in 1769.

=== Modern ===
The Acuerdo sobre Identidad y Derechos de los Pueblos Indígenas was signed in Guatemala in 1995; it recognised the multiethnic character of the nation and specifically defined the Xinca as one of the groups contributing to the ethnic makeup of the republic. Once the Xinca had been officially recognised they began to incorporate themselves into the political scene, joining indigenous organisations such as the Comisión Nacional Permanente de Tierras (CNP Tierra - "Permanent National Land Commission"), a part of the Coordinación de Organizaciones del Pueblo Maya de Guatemala (COPMAGUA - "Coordination of Organisations of the Maya People of Guatemala").

The first Pan-Xinka political organization was created in Chiquimulilla, Santa Rosa, in 1994. It was called Consejo del Pueblo Xinka de Guatemala or COPXIG. The COPXIG was instrumental during the last part of the negotiations of the Guatemalan Peace Accords, specifically during the negotiation the Accord on Indigenous Rights and Identities which was finally signed in Mexico City in 1995.

In 2002, a new political organization was formed under the name of Consenso por la Unidad del Pueblo Xinka de Guatemala or CONXIG. The CONXIG was organized by nine Xinka communities in the departments of Santa Rosa and Jutiapa, as well as by the COPXIG. With the support of the Norwegian International Development Agency (NORAD) and the United Nations Verification Mission for Guatemala (MINUGUA), the CONXIG was transformed into the first indigenous parliament in the country, under the name of Parlamento del Pueblo Xinka de Guatemala or PAPXIGUA.

In 2010, the Canadian company Tahoe Resources opened the Escobal mine in San Rafael Las Flores on Xinca land. When the Xinca took part in protests against Escobal in March 2013, four Xinca community leaders were kidnapped, one of whom was killed. The Xinca have since imposed a blockade on the roads in Casillas to make sure no supplies go to the mine. Local communities have shown overwhelming opposition to the mine in polls, and at least five local mayors have refused payments. Although Guatemala's constitutional court has halted operation of the mine, in April 2018, at least 2000 Xinca led a protest in Guatemala City demanding the closure of the mine. This and similar incidents have persuaded the Canadian government to set up a watchdog for Canadian companies' operations overseas and the company has suffered at least $18 million in losses and has had to lay off at least 250 of its staff at the mine.
