= San Juan Tecuaco =

Municipality of Santa Rosa, Guatemala

San Juan Tecuaco (Spanish pronunciation: [saŋ ˈxwan teˈkwako]; Xinca: Tujkuwa') is a municipality in the Santa Rosa department of Guatemala.

== History ==
The municipality was founded around 1800 by the Xincas, an almost extinct tribe indigenous to the area. San Juan Tecuaco is located in the southeast of Guatemala, in the department of Santa Rosa. Within 82 square km it is surrounded to the west and south by Chiquimulilla, to the east by Oratorio and Pasaco and to the north by Santa Maria Ixhuatan.

The Democratic local government is represented by the Major, (Alcalde) followed by the vice, and three councilors. The fair (feria) Bailes, Misa, and Jaripeos, starts on January 23 and ends on January 27 in honor of San Juan Evangelist.

== Etymology ==
Tecuaco means Tec= tex (Snake), and uaco=cuacl (stone) or place of the snake of stone, a type of rattlesnake.
