= Miss Guatemala 2007 =

- Date: April 1, 2007
- Venue: Auditorio Nacional, Guatemala City, Guatemala
- Broadcaster: Guatevisión
- Entrants: 12
- Winner: Alída María Boer Reyes; Ciudad Capital

The Miss Guatemala 2007 pageant was held on April 1, 2007 at Auditorio Nacionalin the capital city Guatemala City, Guatemala. This year only 12 candidates were competing for the national crown. The chosen winner will represent Guatemala at the Miss Universe 2007 and at Miss Continente Americano 2007. The winner of best national costume, the costume was used in Miss Universe 2007. Miss World Guatemala entered at the Miss World 2007. Miss Guatemala Internacional entered at the Miss International 2007. The Semifinalists entered Miss Intercontinental 2007 and Top Model of the World 2007.

The Miss Guatemala Internacional had injured her shoulder, disabling her from entering the Miss International pageant. The winner, Alida Boer took her spot.

== Final results ==
Final results	Contestant
Miss Guatemala 2007	Ciudad Capital - Alída Boer
Miss World Guatemala	Guatemala - Hamy Tejeda
Miss Guatemala Internacional	Chiquimula - Hania Hernández
Semifinalists	Baja Verapaz - María Zavala; Suchitepéquez - Marianela Tobar

=== Special awards ===
- Miss Photogenic – Hamy Tejada (Ciudad Capital)
- Miss Congeniality (voted by the candidates) – María José Zavala (Ciudad Capital)
- Best National Costume – Hania Hernández (Chiquimula)

== Official Delegates ==
Represent	Contestant	Age	Height	Hometown
Santa Rosa	María José Gaitán Arriola	22	1.66 m (5 ft 5 1/2 in)	Santa Rosa
Guatemala	María José Zavala Orellana	21	1.74 m (5 ft 8 1/2 in)	Amatitlán
Ciudad Capital	Alída María Boer Reyes	21	1.77 m (5 ft 9 1/2 in)	Ciudad Guatemala
Guatemala	Hamy Nataly Tejeda Funes	21	1.73 m (5 ft 8 in)	Ciudad Guatemala
Guatemala	Alba Graciela López Aguilar	19	1.68 m (5 ft 6 in)	Ciudad Guatemala
Chiquimula	Hania Laynée Hernández Manchamé	21	1.78 m (5 ft 10 in)	Esquipulas
Guatemala	Karla María Barrientos Solares	24	1.66 m (5 ft 5 1/2 in)	Ciudad Guatemala
Guatemala	Oneyda Noemí Valiente Toledo	18	1.68 m (5 ft 6 in)	Mixco
Zacapa	Marianela Tobar Arriaza	25	1.66 m (5 ft 5 1/2 in)	Gualán
Guatemala	Jackeline Xiomara Duarte García	21	1.70 m (5 ft 7 in)	Guatemala
