= El Pino Lake =

Lake in Guatemala

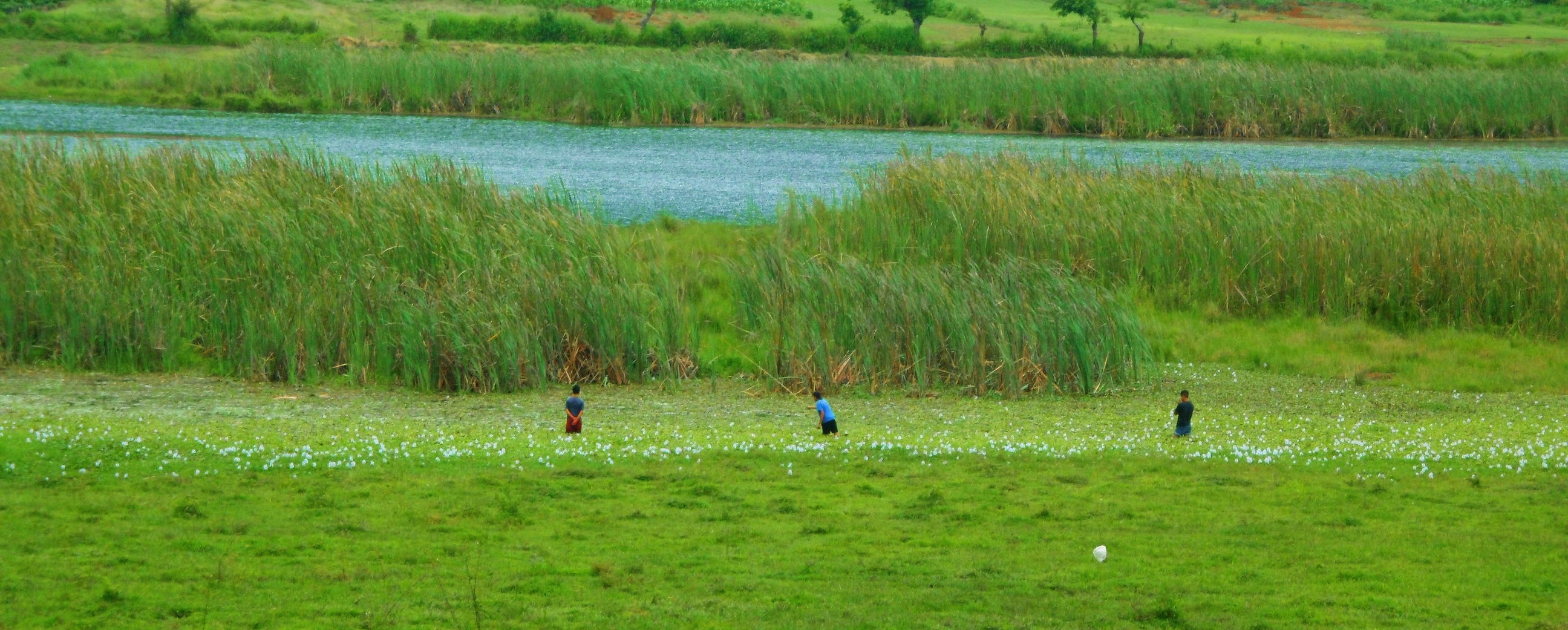

- Location within Guatemala
- Location: Santa Cruz Naranjo and Barberena, Santa Rosa
- Coordinates: 14°20′40″N 90°23′38″W
- Primary inflows: several small streams
- Basin countries: Guatemala
- Surface area: 0.72 km^{2} (0.28 sq mi)
- Max. depth: 18 m (59 ft)
- Surface elevation: 1,022 m (3,353 ft)

El Pino Lake is a lake in Guatemala. It is located 30 km south-southeast of Guatemala City, in the municipalities of Santa Cruz Naranjo (¾ of the lake) and Barberena (¼) in the Santa Rosa Department in southeastern Guatemala. The lake has a surface area of 0.72 km² and a maximum depth of 18 m. The lake waters are used for subsistence fishing, sport fishing, and swimming.

== Laguna El Pino National Park ==
Laguna El Pino National Park
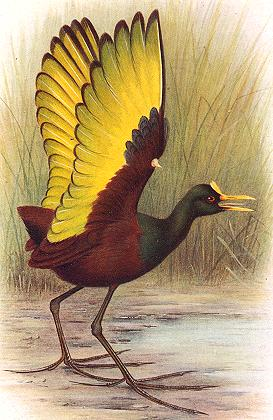
- Jacana spinosa
- Interactive map of Laguna El Pino National Park
- Location: Santa Rosa (department), Guatemala
- Area: 0.73 km^{2} (0.28 sq mi)
- Elevation: 1,022 m (3,353 ft)
- Established: Ac. Gubernativo 26-05-55
- Visitors: allowed
- Operator: INAB

In 1955 the lake, and a minor part of the lake shores, were designated a national park. The park, including the lake, covers an area of 0.73 km² and is managed by the National Forestry Institute (INAB) in conjunction with representatives of the local population. 20% of the lake shores are government property and 80% is privately owned.

Vegetation consists mainly of floating beds of Water Hyacinth (Eichhornia crassipes), submergent beds of Waterweed (Elodea canadensis), and marshy areas with Spikerushes (Eleocharis elegans) and Giant Bulrush (Scirpus californicus). The lake shores have some wooded areas with Casuarina species, Cupressus lusitanica, Inga xalapensis and Pinus species. The surrounding area has coffee plantations.

Species of waterfowl breeding in the lake area include Pied-billed Grebe (Podilymbus podiceps), Egret (Bubulcus ibis), Waterhen (Gallinula galeata), American Coot (Fulica americana) and Northern Jacana (Jacana spinosa).
