= Guanagazapa =

Municipality of Escuintla Department, Guatemala

- Municipality
- Location within Guatemala
- Coordinates: 14°14′N 90°39′W
- Country: Guatemala
- Department: Escuintla

Area
  - Total: 386.2 km^{2} (149.1 sq mi)

Population (2023 estimate)
  - Total: 17,565
  - Density: 45.48/km^{2} (117.8/sq mi)

Guanagazapa (Spanish pronunciation: [ɡwanaɣaˈsapa]) is a city and a municipality in the Escuintla department of Guatemala. It covers an area of approximately 386.2 km^{2} (149.1 sq mi). As per 2023 estimates, it has a population of about 17,565 inhabitants.

== History ==
As per a document from the government archives, the original settlement of Guanagazapa was destroyed by a fire in 1808, and the inhabitants were forced to move to a new location. The population, which included 157 indigenous people and 25 Ladinos, settled in on a new place known as Los Apantes or Los Jobales, as recorded by the mayor of Escuintla and the head priest of the parish. This location was about 2 km (1.2 mi) from the current location, and no official document is available that refers to the establishment of the municipality itself. As per a government notice on 16 June 1915, the municipality of Guanagazapa was restored along with other municipalities in the region.

== Geography ==
Guanagazapa is a municipality in the Escuintla Department in Guatemala. It is spread over an area of 386.2 km^{2} (149.1 sq mi). It lies in the southeastern part of the department, about 25 km (16 mi) from the departmental capital of Escuintla. It borders the municipalities of San Vicente Pacaya to the north, Iztapa to the south, Pueblo Nuevo Viñas and Taxisco to the east, and Escuintla and Masagua to the west. The northern part of the municipality consists of mountainous terrain, the central part is the populated urban area, while the south and south east form the plains, which consist of agricultural and pastoral lands.

Located at an elevation of 342.74 m (1,124.5 ft) above sea level, Guanagazapa has a tropical monsoon climate (Köppen climate classification: Am). The municipality has an average annual temperature of 24.76 °C (76.57 °F), and receives about 117.21 mm (4.615 in) of rainfall annually.

== Demographics ==
The municipality had an estimated population of 17,565 inhabitants in 2023. The population consisted of 9,130 males and 8,435 females. About 33.2% of the population was below the age of fourteen, and 5.0% was over the age of 65 years. Majority of the population (76.6%) was classified as rural, while 23.4% lived in urban areas. About 68.9% of the inhabitants were born in the same municipality. Ladinos (82.2%) formed the major ethnic group, with Maya (17.5%) forming a significant minority. The municipality had a literacy rate of 81.0%, and Spanish (92.7%) was the most spoken language.
