= Los Esclavos River =

Río Los Esclavos
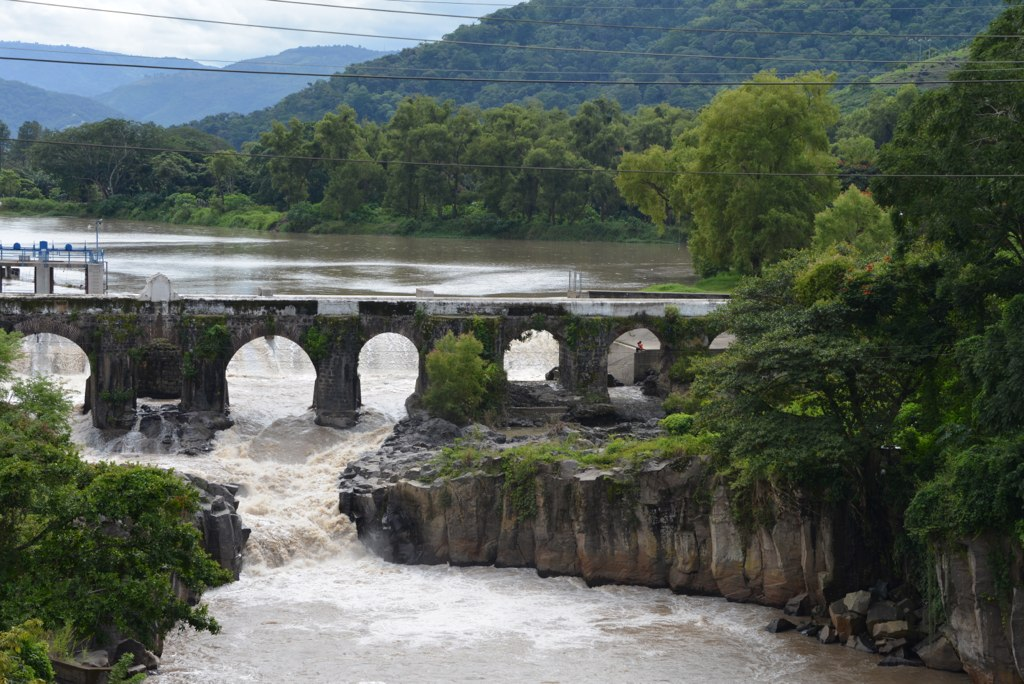
- Bridge over Los Esclavos river

- Location of mouth

Location
- Country: Guatemala

Physical characteristics
- Source
  - location: Mataquescuintla (Santa Rosa)
  - coordinates: 14°28′28″N 90°14′35″W
  - elevation: 2,000 m (6,600 ft)
- Mouth
  - location: Laguna de Sipacate
  - coordinates: 13°50′20″N 90°19′46″W
  - elevation: 0 m (0 ft)
- Length: 145 km (90 mi)
- Basin size: Pacific
- Discharge
  - average: 15.8 m^{3}/s (560 cu ft/s) (La Sonrisa)

The Río Los Esclavos is a river in southern Guatemala. Its sources are in the mountains in the southeast of the department of Santa Rosa. From there it flows past the town of Cuilapa through the coastal plains of Santa Rosa into the Laguna de Sipacate and then into the Pacific Ocean.

The Los Esclavos river basin covers a territory of 2,271 km^{2} (877 sq ml).

== Bridge ==
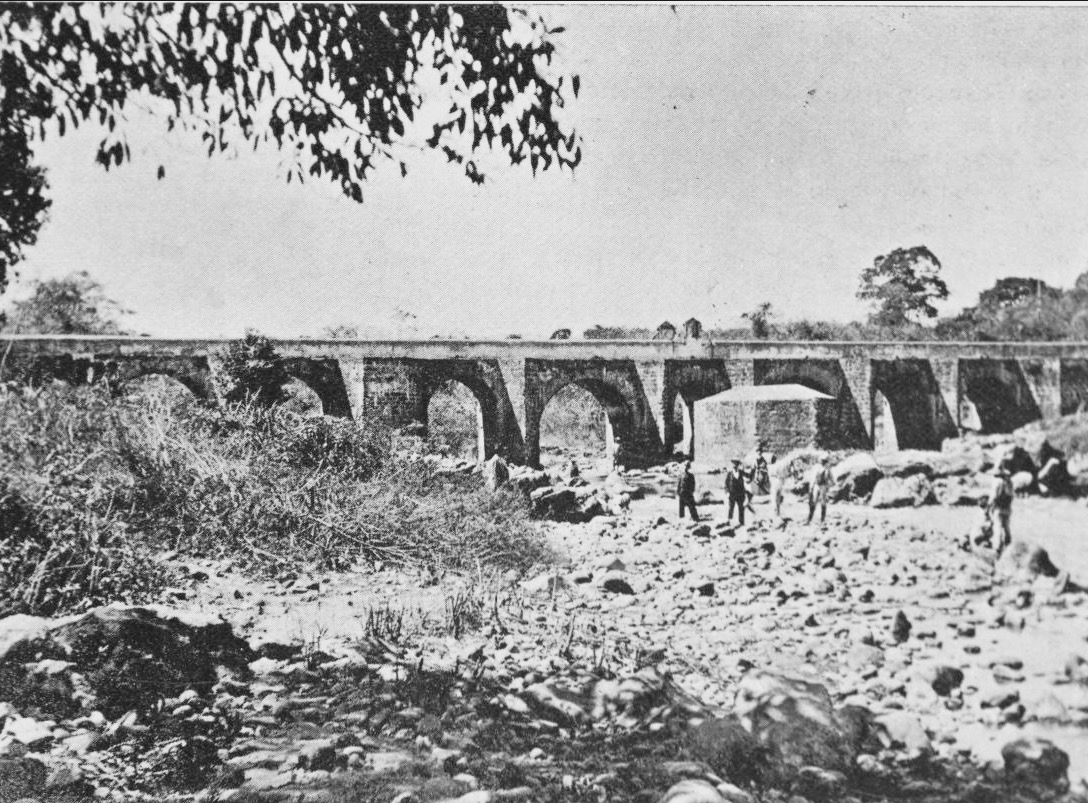
Bridge over Los Esclavos river in 1897

A bridge was built over this river during the Spanish Colony, thanks to the initiative of Baltazar de Orena from Valle Town Hall and governor Pedro Mayen de la Rueda, who proposed its construction in 1579. The bridge was completed in 1592 under the director of architects Francisco Tirado and Diego Felipe. Years later, some repair were needed, and criollo poet and leader Francisco Antonio de Fuentes y Guzmán was in charge of the work.

Back in those days, all merchandise that came to Santiago de los Caballeros city, the capital city, came through Acajutla harbor, and the bridge was built to avoid the inconveniences that occurred whenever the river was too high. The bridge is 117 metres (128 yd) long and 16 metres (18 yd) across. It was built above 11 arches and, after almost 500 years, still stands in spite of the strong current and the earthquakes and storms that have damaged the rest of Guatemalan infrastructure.

== Gallery ==
- Media related to Los Esclavos river at Wikimedia Commons
- Media related to Los Esclavos bridge at Wikimedia Commons
