= Paso Hondo River =

Río Paso Hondo

Location
- Country: Guatemala

Physical characteristics
- Source
  - location: Tecuamburro volcano, Guatemala
  - elevation: 1,921 m (6,302 ft)
- Mouth
  - location: Pacific Ocean
  - elevation: 0 m (0 ft)
- Length: 55.2 km (34.3 mi)
- Basin size: 512 km^{2} (198 sq mi)
- Discharge
  - location: El Jobo
  - average: 23.2 m^{3}/s (820 cu ft/s)

The Río Paso Hondo is a river in southern Guatemala. Its sources are located on the slopes of the Tecuamburro volcano. From there it flows in a southerly direction to the Pacific Ocean.

The Paso Hondo River is 55.2 kilometres (34.3 mi) long, and its river basin covers an area of 512 km^{2} (198 sq ml).
