= Oratorio, Santa Rosa =

Oratorio
- Municipality
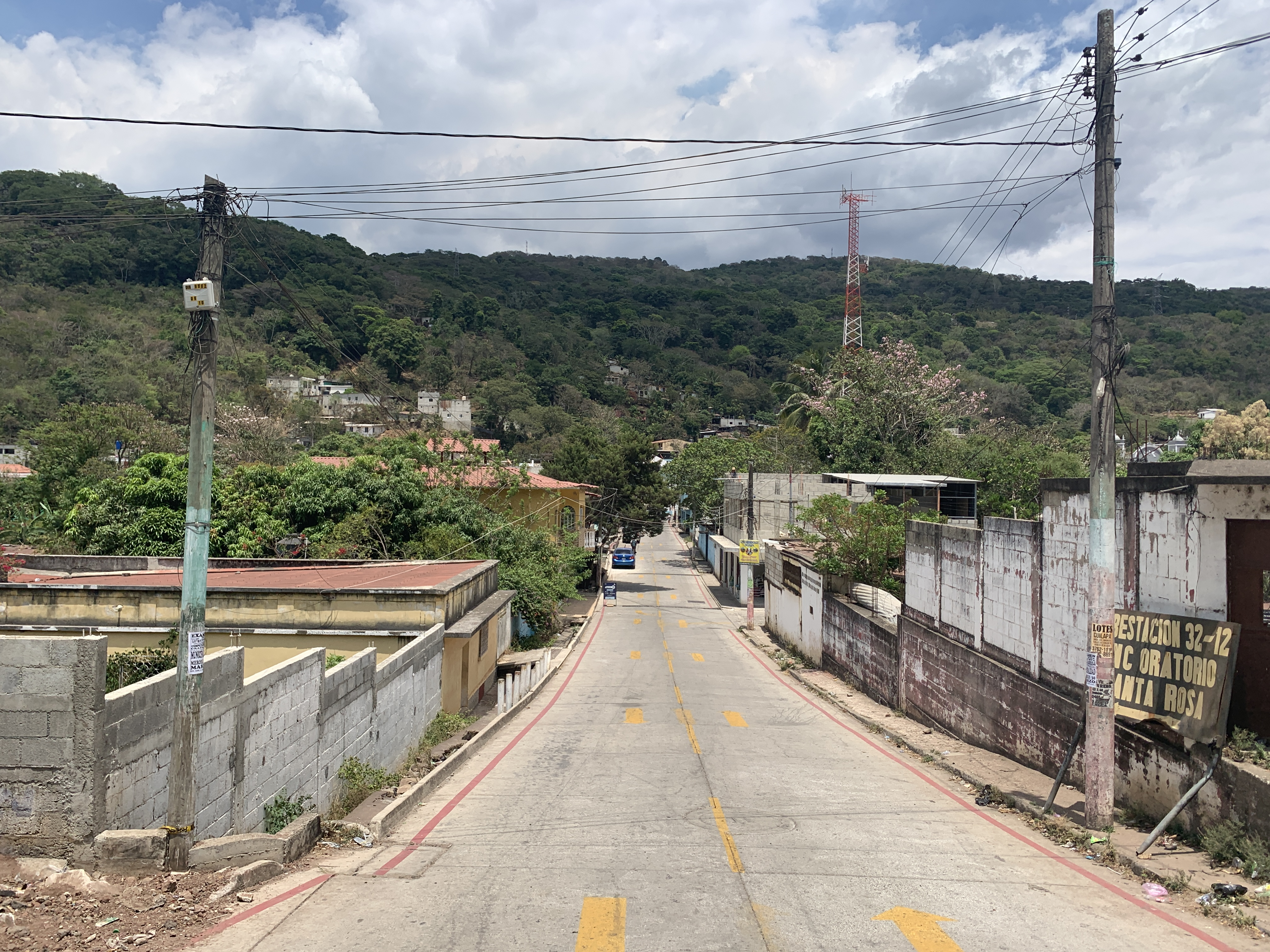
- Looking down 1a Avenida in 2022

- Location of Oratorio in Guatemala Oratorio (Central America)
- Coordinates: 14.2281°N 90.1758°W
- Country: Guatemala
- Department: Santa Rosa
- Foundation: April 1830

Government
  - Mayor: Ely Yovani Orozco (2016-2020)

Area
  - Municipality: 353 km^{2} (136 sq mi)
- Elevation: 951 m (3,120 ft)

Population (2018 census)
  - Municipality: 24,954
  - Density: 70.7/km^{2} (183/sq mi)
  - Urban: 10,068
- Time zone: UTC−6
- Zip code: 06006

Oratorio is a town and municipality in the Santa Rosa department of Guatemala.

On the outskirts of the regional centerplace, Cuilapa, Oratorio is mainly an agricultural worker habitat. It is surrounded by vast coffee bean and banana plantations. Oratorio sits in a deep valley, so the sun rises late and sets early. The small town is stretched along one of the international two-lane highways that leads to El Salvador. The stretch of land makes for a very narrow but long city outline. Pollution from semi-trucks and buses gathers inside the high valley mountain walls.

The town is located 78 km from Guatemala City on Route CA-8 towards El Salvador. Its inhabitants are dedicated to agriculture and to a lesser extent to livestock rearing. The main agricultural products are corn and beans (for self-consumption, with few commercial purposes), coffee (for commercial purposes, during the season between November and February), rice, sorghum, cane and others crops of lesser importance.

In the constitution of the State of Guatemala that was promulgated in 1825, after the Independence of Central America in 1821, Oratorio was part of the Circuit of Cuajiniquilapa for the delivery of justice through jury trials, in the 3rd District (Mita) . On June 3, 2016, former mayor Abel Sandoval was captured for the crimes of money laundering and other assets; Sandoval was mayor during four periods and was deputy of the Congress of the Republic of Guatemala from 2004 to 2008.

Its titular celebration takes place on February 27 to March 3, dedicated to the Holy Family. Another of the most well-known fairs in Oratorio is that of the Finca El Soyate, which in the month of January from 13 to 15 celebrate its patronal feast in honor of the Black Christ of Esquipulas.
