= Unión Cantinil =

- Municipality
- Location in Guatemala
- Coordinates: 15°36′18″N 91°43′8″W
- Country: Guatemala
- Department: Huehuetenango
- Climate: Cwb

Unión Cantinil is a municipality in the Guatemalan department of Huehuetenango.
