= Palencia, Guatemala =

Palencia
- Municipality
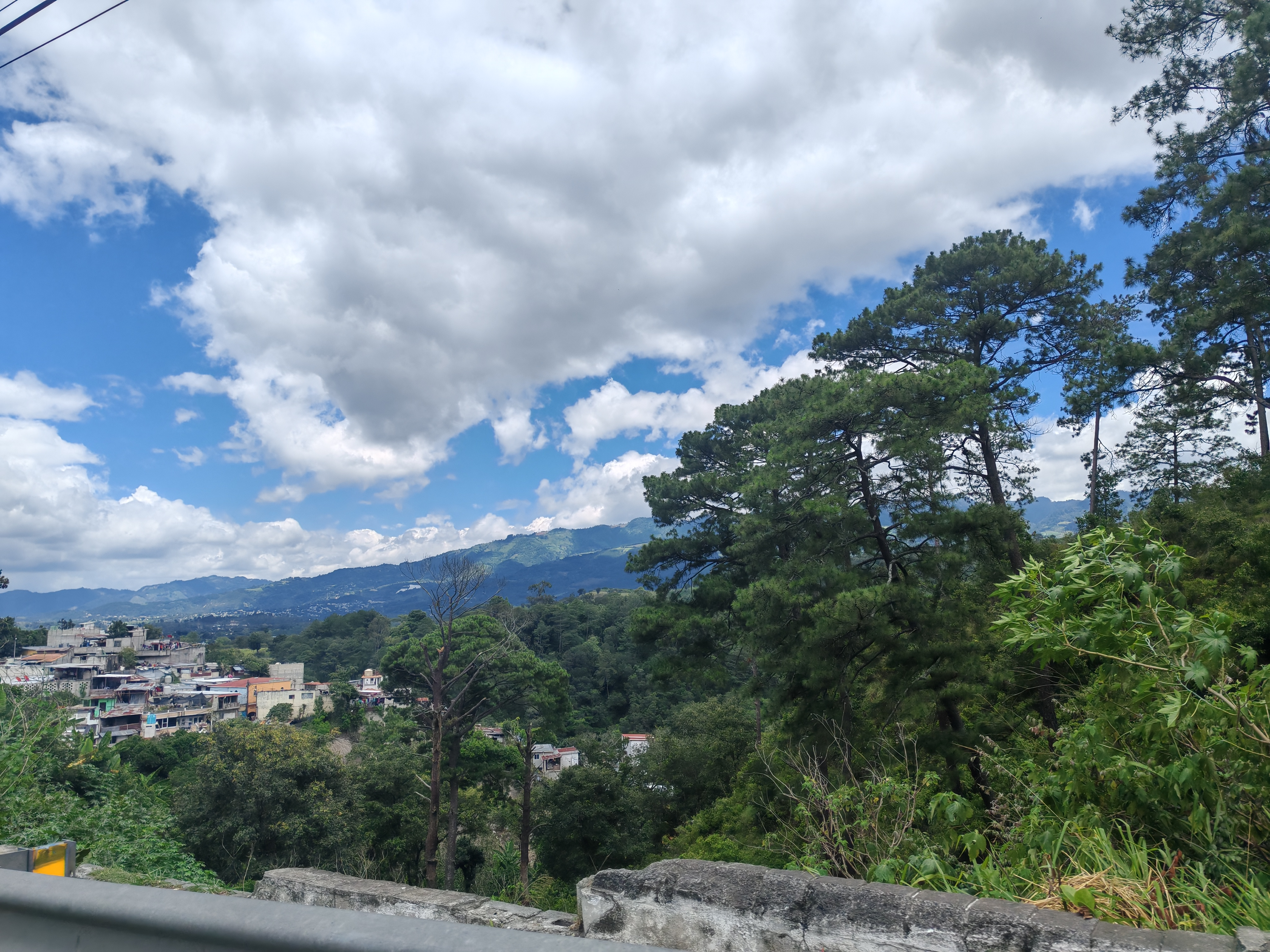
- Panoramic View of the City of Palencia

- Location in Guatemala
- Coordinates: 14°40′N 90°22′W
- Country: Guatemala
- Department: Guatemala Department

Area
  - Total: 93 sq mi (240 km^{2})
- Elevation: 4,590 ft (1,399 m)

Population (2018 census)
  - Total: 70,973
  - Density: 770/sq mi (300/km^{2})
- Climate: Aw

Palencia (Spanish pronunciation: [paˈlensja]) is a town, with a population of 31,824 (2018 census), and a municipality in the Guatemala department of Guatemala.
