= Gualán =

Coordinates: 15°08′N 89°22′W

- Municipality
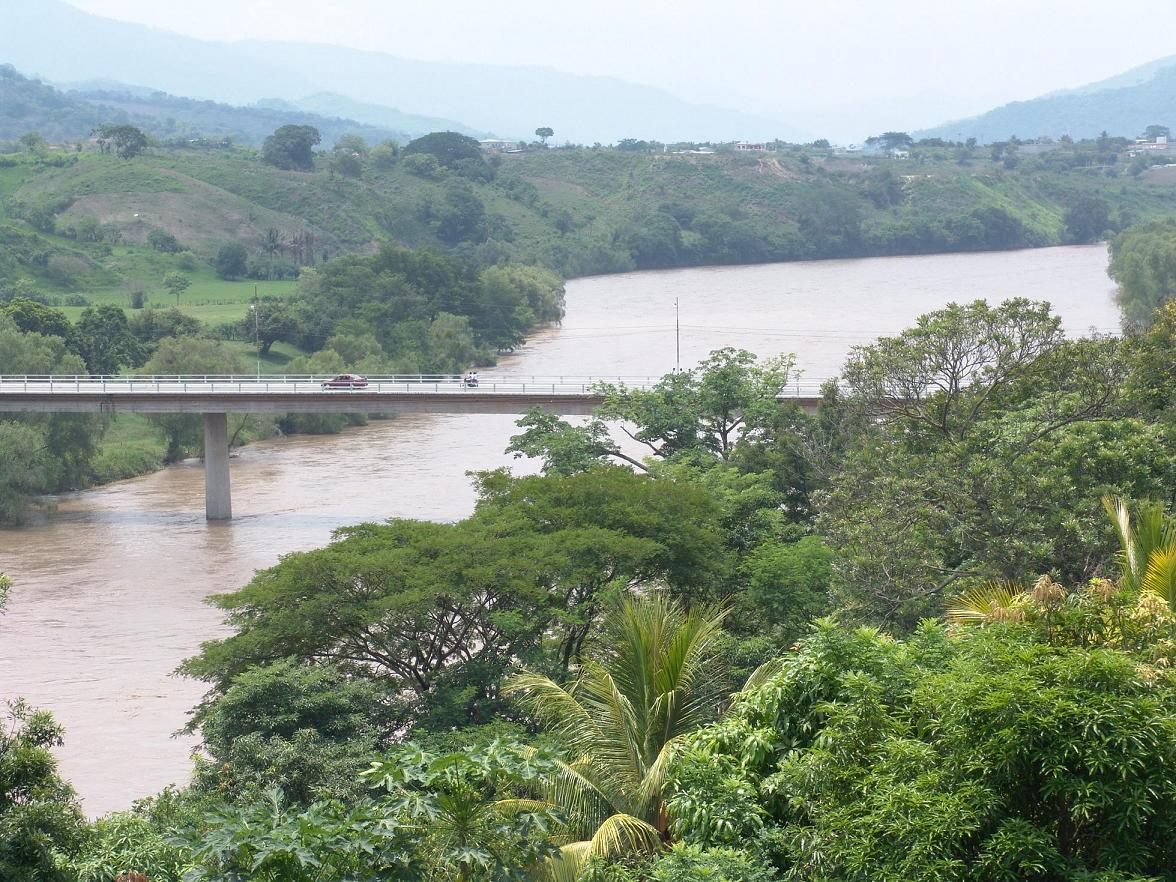

- Flag

- Location in Guatemala
- Country: Guatemala
- Department: Zacapa Department

Area
  - Municipality: 336 sq mi (871 km^{2})

Population (2018 census)
  - Municipality: 45,663
  - Density: 136/sq mi (52.4/km^{2})
  - Urban: 6,430

Gualán is a town and municipality in the Guatemalan department of Zacapa. It is located in the Eastern part of the country about 165 Kilometers from Guatemala City on route CA-9.

== Population ==
As of 1850, Gualán had an estimated population of 2,000. In 2018, it had a population of 6,430.

== Economy ==
Gualán produces tomato, sugar cane, fish and coffee. As most of the Zacapa department, it has a considerable amount of manufacturing industry (although informal industry is present as well), mainly regional companies providing services and products targeted towards local consumption.

== Holidays ==
May 6 to May 8 is the celebration feast in honor of Saint Michael, the Archangel.
