= Tecuamburro =

Mountain in Guatemala

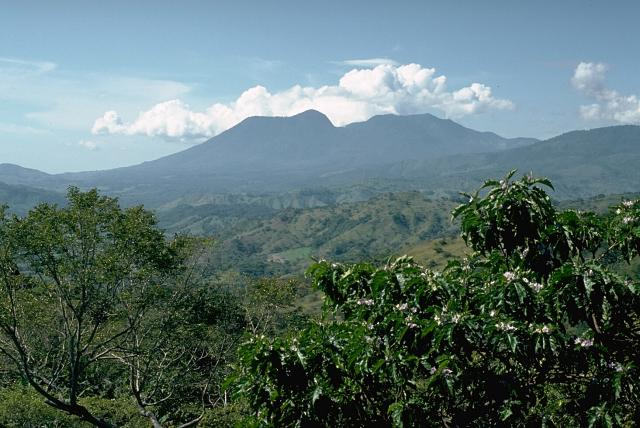
- Volcán Tecuamburro

Highest point
- Elevation: 1,845 m (6,053 ft)
- Coordinates: 14°9′21″N 90°24′25″W

Geography
- Location within Guatemala
- Location: Santa Rosa, Guatemala

Geology
- Mountain type: Stratovolcano
- Volcanic arc: Central America Volcanic Arc
- Last eruption: 960 BCE ± 75 years

Tecuamburro (Xinca: Xan Woona) is a stratovolcano in southern Guatemala, roughly 50 kilometres south east of Guatemala City. The Tecuamburro is an andesitic stratovolcano which formed approximately 38,000 years ago inside a horseshoe-shaped caldera formed by a structural failure in a second, 100,000-year-old stratovolcano, known as Miraflores. The last eruption is believed to have occurred around 960 BCE. At the top of the Tecuamburro is an acidic crater lake around which many hot springs, fumaroles, and boiling mudpots are found.

== See also ==
- List of volcanoes in Guatemala
