= Petatán =

- Municipality
- Location in Guatemala
- Coordinates: 15°37′16″N 91°43′51″W
- Country: Guatemala
- Department: Huehuetenango
- Climate: Cwb

Petatán is a municipality in the Guatemalan department of Huehuetenango.
