= Sansare =

- Location in Guatemala
- Coordinates: 14°45′00″N 90°07′00″W
- Country: Guatemala
- Department: El Progreso

Government
  - Mayor: Pablo Aguilar
- Climate: Aw

Sansare is a municipality in the El Progreso department of Guatemala. It is situated at 790 m above sea level. It contains 11,100 people. It covers a terrain of 118 km^{2}. Its annual festival is September 23-September 25. Sansare is known for its annual bicycle race, the "Carretera Valle del Sare".

== History ==
The municipality and the valley are named after the sare tree (Acaciella angustissima).

The area was already settled by Mayans, associated with the cultures of Copán and Quiriguá, when the Spanish arrived. The valley was mentioned as early as 1769 in Spanish records, and the municipality was included in those mentioned in the creation of the department of Zacapa in 1871. In 1908 it was transferred to El Progresso Department.
