= Barberena =

- Municipality of Guatemala
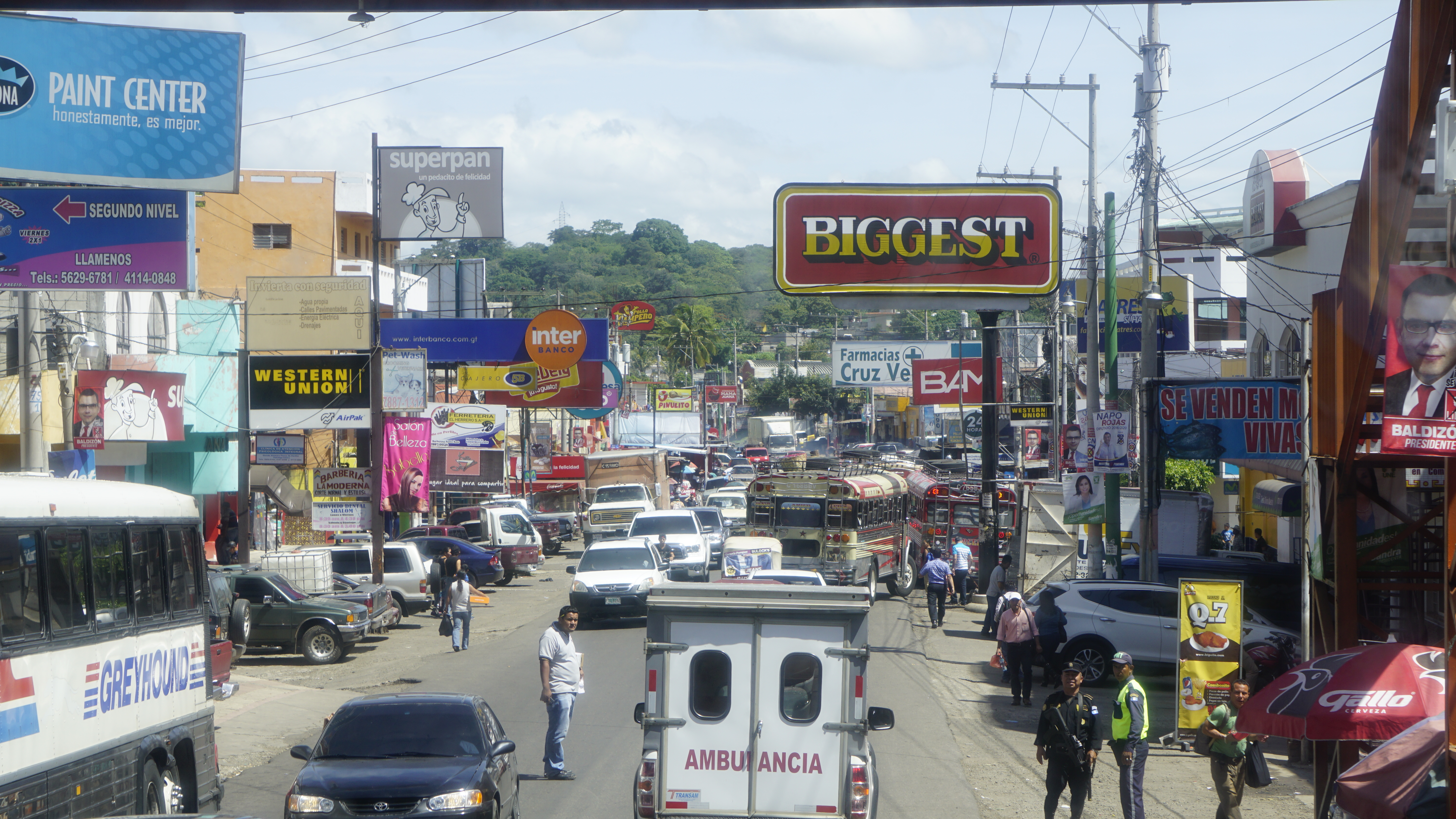
- Inter-American Highway in Barberena

- Location in Guatemala Barberena (Santa Rosa Department)
- Coordinates: 14°19′N 90°22′W
- Country: Guatemala
- Department: Santa Rosa

Government
  - Mayor (2016–2020): Víctor Jiménez

Area
  - Total: 114 sq mi (294 km^{2})
- Elevation: 3,507 ft (1,069 m)

Population (2018 census)
  - Total: 58,276
  - Density: 513/sq mi (198/km^{2})
- Climate: Aw

Barberena is a town, with a population of 47,093 (2018 census), and a municipality in Santa Rosa department of Guatemala. Filled with local vendors and stores selling American goods, Barberena is a small town typical of the Guatemalan countryside.

Due to its close proximity to many rural communities, Barberena plays a central role in the local economy, especially as a point of exchange for agricultural goods and manufactured products.

== History ==
=== 1913 earthquake ===
On Saturday 8 March 1913, a magnitude 6.4 earthquake hit Santa Rosa, destroying its department capital, Cuilapa. Both the initial quake and the replicas destroyed a lot of private homes, and also the cathedral and the prison, leaving behind significant human losses; similar destruction occurred at Barberena, Cerro Redondo, Llano Grande and El Zapote. Fraijanes, Pueblo Nuevo Viñas, Coatepeque and Jalpatagua were also affected. Around Cuilapa, there were landslides and road blockades, and even a long crack was reported at Los Esclavos hill.

== Climate ==
Barberena tropical climate (Köppen: Aw).

Climate data for Barberena
Month	Jan	Feb	Mar	Apr	May	Jun	Jul	Aug	Sep	Oct	Nov	Dec	Year
Mean daily maximum °C (°F)	26.4 (79.5)	27.5 (81.5)	28.6 (83.5)	28.3 (82.9)	27.9 (82.2)	26.5 (79.7)	27.1 (80.8)	26.9 (80.4)	26.3 (79.3)	26.3 (79.3)	25.9 (78.6)	25.9 (78.6)	27.0 (80.5)
Daily mean °C (°F)	20.5 (68.9)	21.4 (70.5)	22.2 (72.0)	22.6 (72.7)	22.7 (72.9)	22.0 (71.6)	22.3 (72.1)	22.1 (71.8)	21.9 (71.4)	21.7 (71.1)	20.8 (69.4)	20.5 (68.9)	21.7 (71.1)
Mean daily minimum °C (°F)	14.7 (58.5)	15.3 (59.5)	15.8 (60.4)	17.0 (62.6)	17.5 (63.5)	17.6 (63.7)	17.5 (63.5)	17.3 (63.1)	17.5 (63.5)	17.1 (62.8)	15.7 (60.3)	15.2 (59.4)	16.5 (61.7)
Average precipitation mm (inches)	10 (0.4)	7 (0.3)	17 (0.7)	65 (2.6)	253 (10.0)	320 (12.6)	271 (10.7)	275 (10.8)	378 (14.9)	304 (12.0)	56 (2.2)	15 (0.6)	1,971 (77.8)
Source: Climate-Data.org

== Geographic location ==
Barberena is surrounded by Santa Rosa Department municipalities, except on the West, where it borders with Escuintla Department:

== See also ==
- List of places in Guatemala

== Notes and references ==
=== Bibliography ===
- Ambraseys, Nicholas; Adams, Robin A. (2001). The Seismicity of Central America; a descriptive catalogue 1898–1995. World Scientific. p. 309. ISBN 9781860942440.
