= Santa Cruz Naranjo =

Municipality of Santa Rosa, Guatemala

Coordinates: 14°23′09″N 90°22′15″W

Santa Cruz Naranjo is a municipality in the Santa Rosa department in Guatemala. The population in the 2002 census was 11,241.
