= Santa Rosa Department, Guatemala =

Department of Guatemala

Santa Rosa Department Departmento de Santa Rosa
- Department of Guatemala
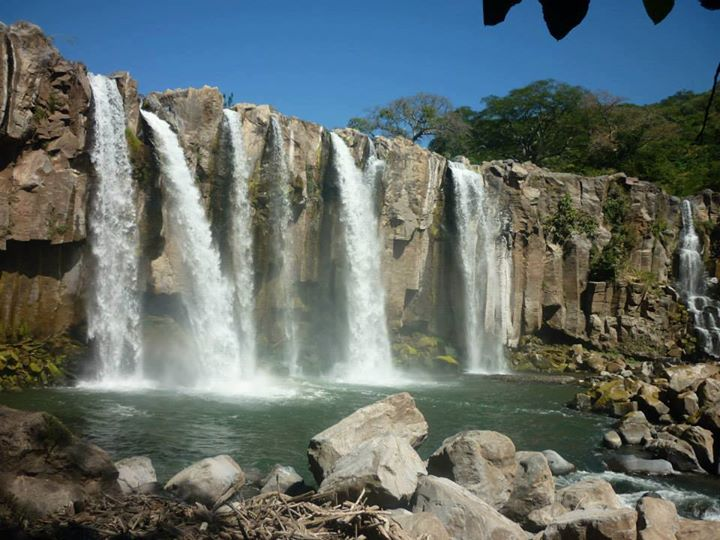
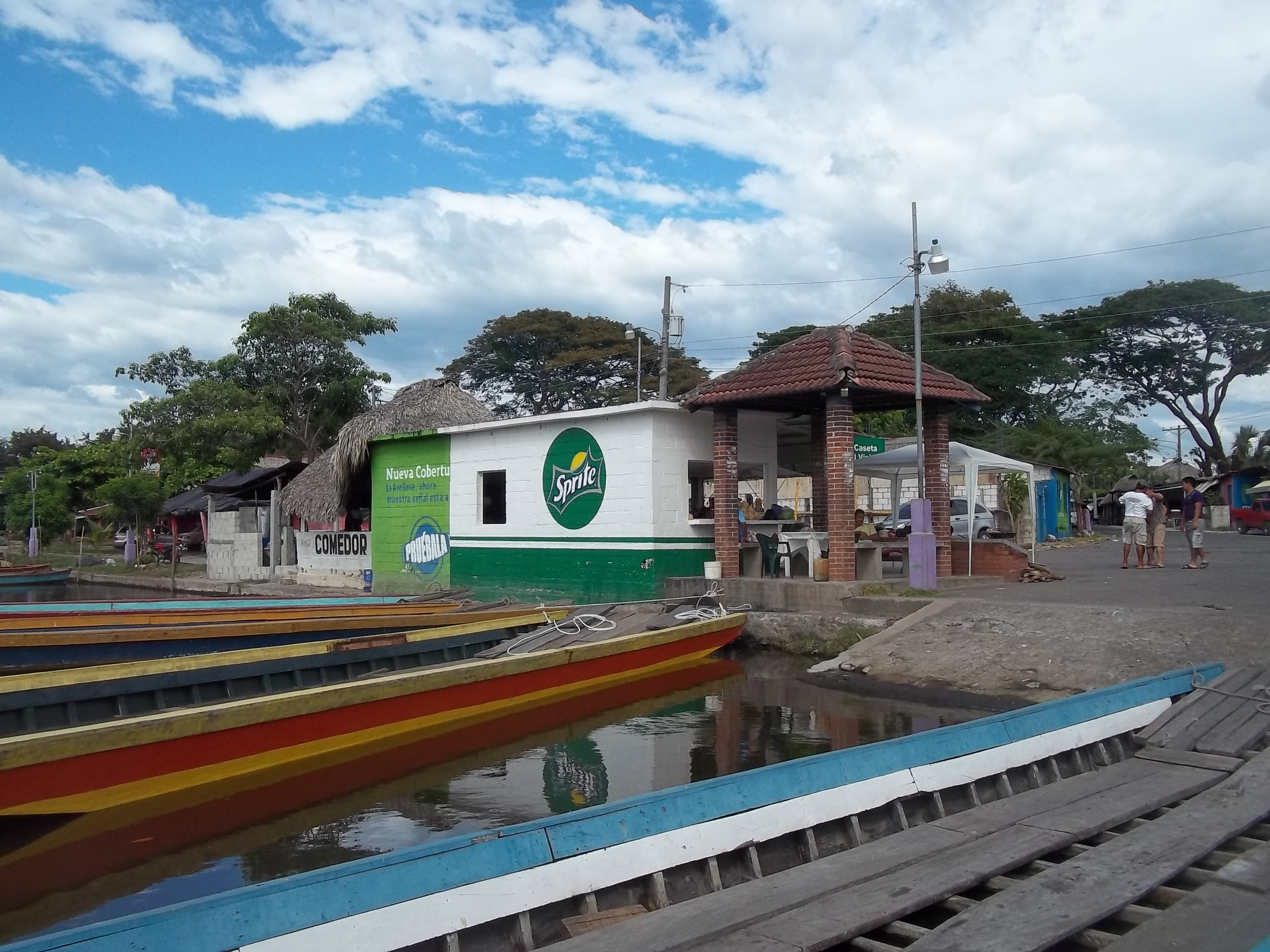
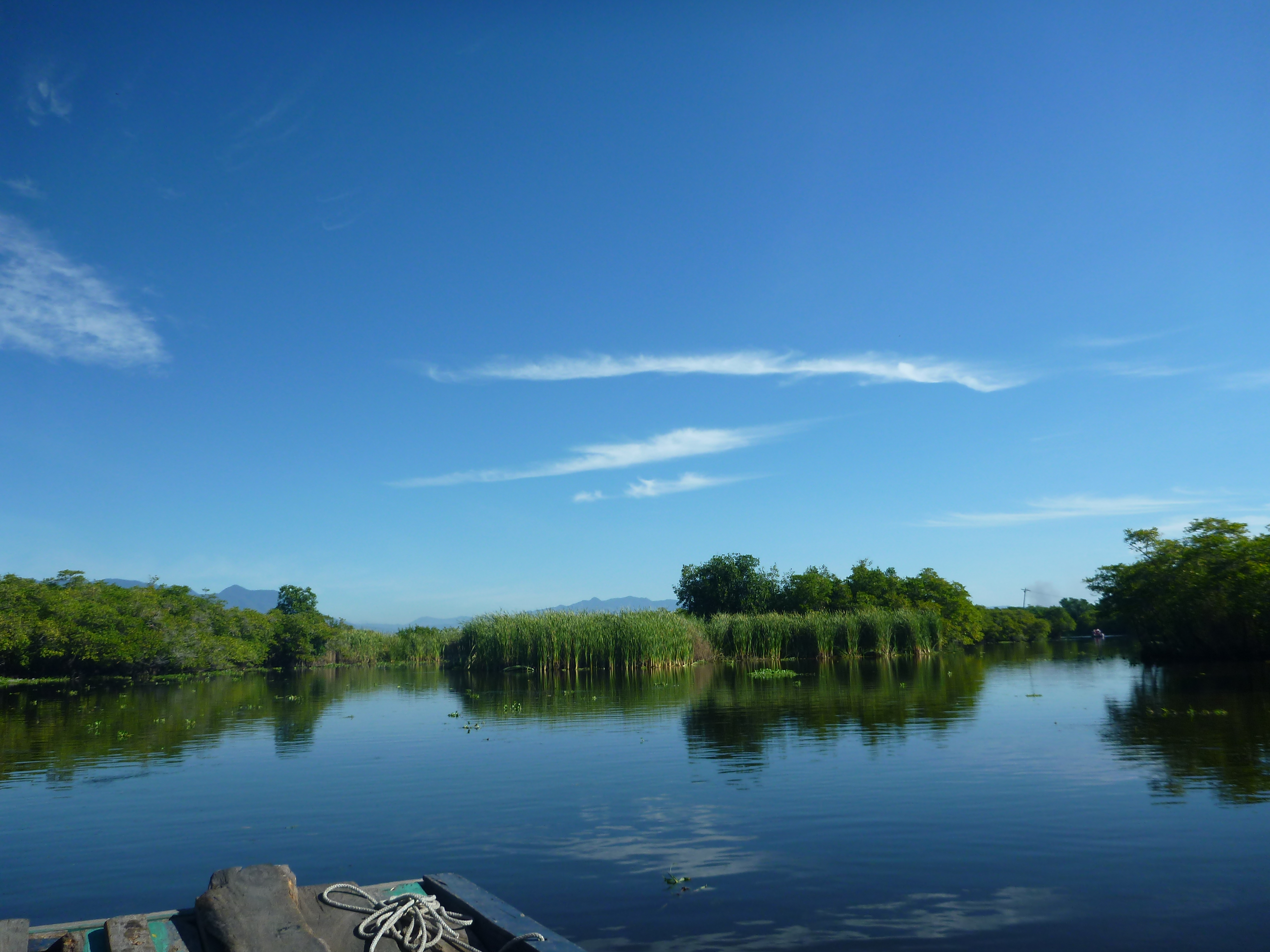
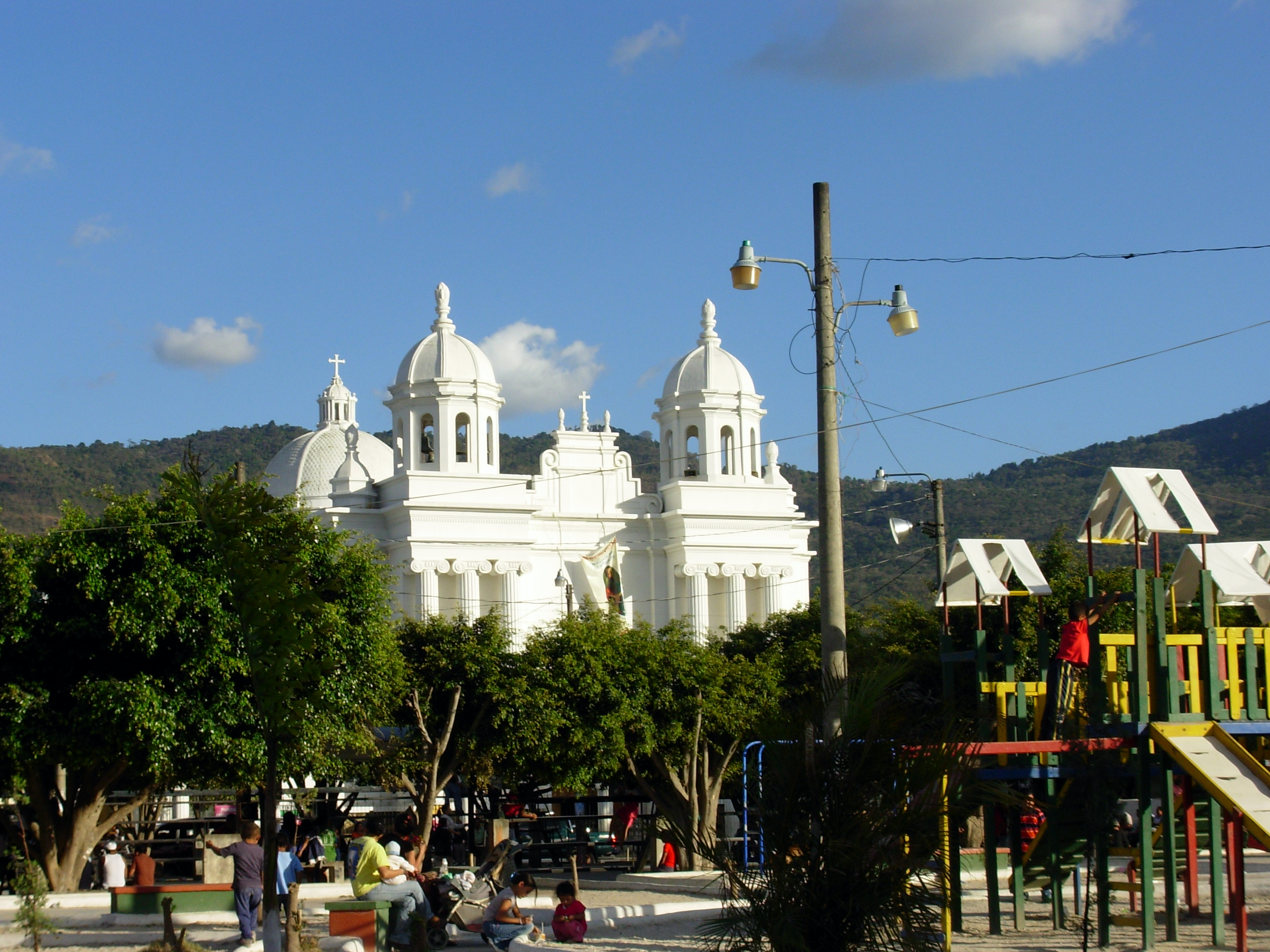
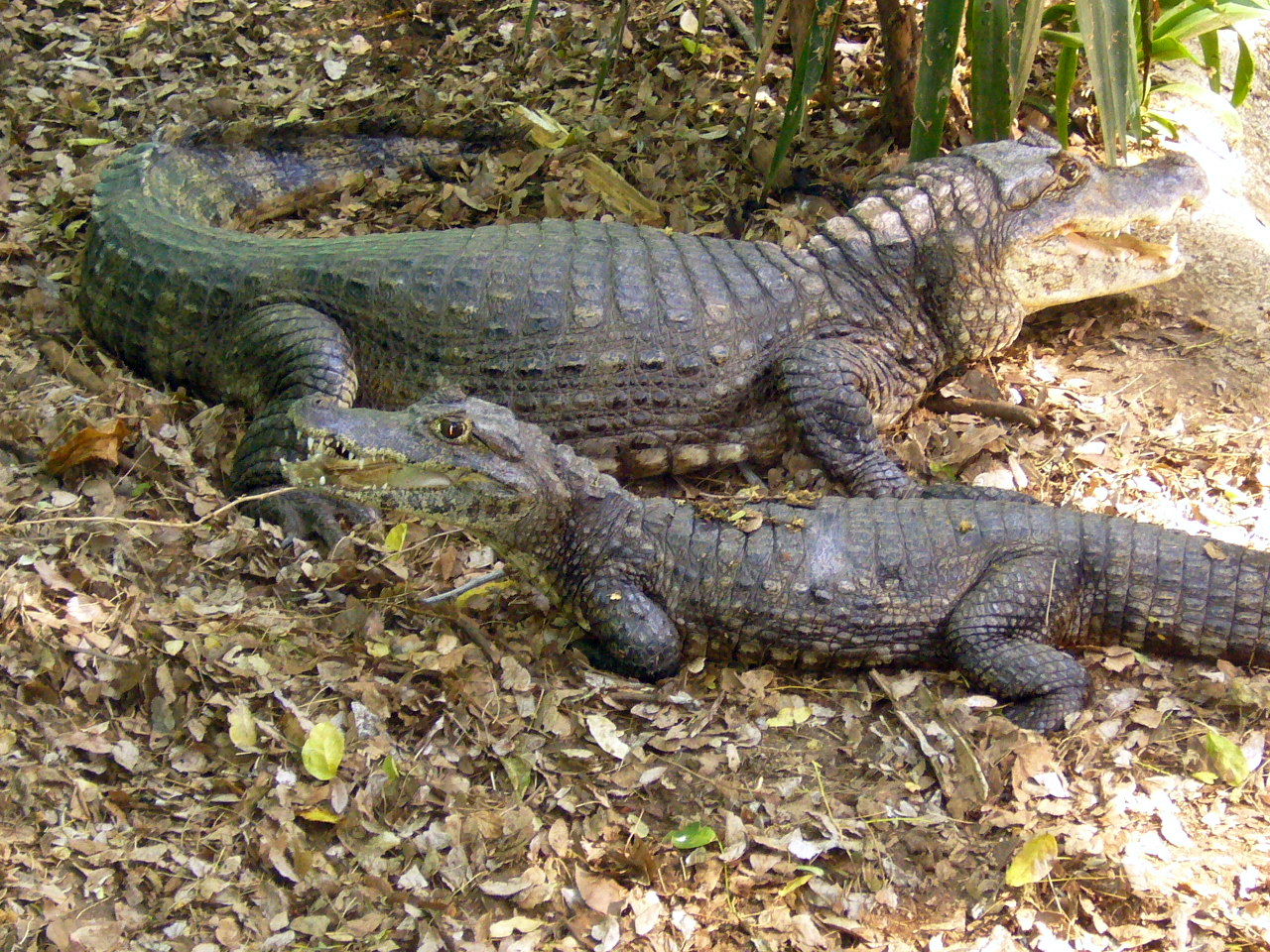
- Waterfall and rock deposits Dock in La Avellana Monterrico Central park Crocodiles in Taxisco

- Flag Coat of arms

- Santa Rosa
- Coordinates: 14°16′42″N 90°18′00″W
- Country: Guatemala
- Capital: Cuilapa
- Largest settlement: Barberena
- Municipalities: 14

Government
  - Type: Departmental

Area
  - Department of Guatemala: 2,295 km^{2} (886 sq mi)
- Highest elevation: 1,330 m (4,360 ft)
- Lowest elevation: 214 m (702 ft)

Population (2018)
  - Department of Guatemala: 396,607
  - Density: 172.8/km^{2} (447.6/sq mi)
  - Urban: 184,212
  - Ethnicities: Ladino Xinca
  - Religions: Roman Catholicism Evangelicalism
- Time zone: UTC-6
- ISO 3166 code: GT-SR

Santa Rosa (Spanish pronunciation: [ˈsanta ˈrosa]) is a department in Guatemala. The capital is Cuilapa.

== History ==
=== 1913 earthquake ===
On Saturday 8 March 1913, a magnitude 6.4 earthquake hit Santa Rosa, destroying its department capital, Cuilapa. Both the initial quake and the after shocks destroyed a lot of private homes, and also the cathedral and the prison, leaving behind significant human losses; similar destruction occurred at Barberena, Cerro Redondo, Llano Grande and El Zapote. Fraijanes, Pueblo Nuevo Viñas, Coatepeque and Jalpatagua were also affected. Around Cuilapa, there were landslides and road blockades, and even a long crack was reported at Los Esclavos hill.

== Municipalities ==
1. Barberena
2. Casillas
3. Chiquimulilla
4. Cuilapa
5. Guazacapán
6. Nueva Santa Rosa
7. Oratorio
8. Pueblo Nuevo Viñas
9. San Juan Tecuaco
10. San Rafael Las Flores
11. Santa Cruz Naranjo
12. Santa María Ixhuatán
13. Santa Rosa de Lima
14. Taxisco

== Geography ==
Santa Rosa water systems
Type	Name	Location
Rivers	Negro, Los Achiotes, Tapalapa, Los Vados, San Antonio, Las Cañas, La Plata, Utapa, Amapa, El Panal, Las Marías, El Amarillo, Aguacinapa, Las Margaritas, Utema, Urayala	Santa Rosa Department
Rivers	Paso Hondo River	
Rivers	María Linda	Border with Escuintla Department
Rivers	Los Esclavos River	Cuilapa, Mataquescuintla
Rivers	Canal de Chiquimulilla	Chiquimulillal|
Rivers	Ojiveros creek	
Rivers	Paso Caballos creek	
Ponds	Ayarza	Casillas and San Rafael Las Flores
Ponds	Ixpaco	Ixpaco Village, Pueblo Nuevo Viñas
Ponds	Ojo de Agua	Nueva Santa Rosa
Ponds	Laguna Pereira	Santa Rosa de Lima
Ponds	Laguna El Pino	Barberena and Santa Cruz Naranjo
Ponds	La Palmilla	Taxisco
Ponds	Tamarindo Viejo	La Avellana, Taxisco

== Culture ==
=== Municipal fairs ===
Santa Rosa municipal fairs
Municipality	Days	In honor of
Barberena	1 to 6 January	Virgen de la Merced
Casillas	12 to 16 January	Esquipulas Black Christ
Chiquimulilla	30 April to 4 May	Holy Cross
Cuilapa	24 to 25 December	Baby Jesus
Cuilapa	1 to 8 de August	Señor de los Portentos
Guazacapán	6 to 11 December	Immaculate Conception of the Blessed Virgin Mary
Nueva Santa Rosa	12 to 18 November,(variable)	Cristo Rey
Oratorio	28 February to 3 Marzo	Holy Family
Pueblo Nuevo Viñas	18 to 23 January	Esquipulas Black Christ
San Juan Tecuaco	22 to 26 January	Saint John the Baptist
San Rafael Las Flores	22 to 26 October	Saint Raphael Archangel
Santa Cruz Naranjo	1 to 5 May	Holy Cross
Santa María Ixhuatán	13 to 17 December	Virgin Mary
Santa Rosa de Lima	27 to 31 August	Santa Rosa de Lima
Taxisco	12 to 18 January	Esquipulas Black Christ

== Tourism ==
Santa Rosa tourist and archeological attractions
Attraction	Name	Location
Ponds	Ayarza	Casillas and San Rafael Las Flores
Ponds	El Pino	Cerinal, Barberena and Santa Cruz Naranjo
Ponds	Ixpaco	Tecuamburro, Pueblo Nuevo Viñas
Ponds	Tamarindo Viejo	La Avellana, Taxisco
Volcanoes	Tecuamburro	Tecuamburro
Volcanoes	Jumaytepeqe	Nueva Santa Rosa
Volcanoes	Cruz Quemada	Ixhuatán
Volcanoes	Cerro Redondo	Cerinal and Santa Cruz Naranjo
Colonial monuments	"Los Esclavos" colonial bridge	Cuilapa
Colonial monuments	Colonial parish and Santa Rosa de Lima Temple	Cuilapa
Colonial monuments	Jumaytepeqe Colonial Catholic Church	Nueva Santa Rosa
Colonial monuments	La Ermita worship center	Nueva Santa Rosa
Waterfalls	Los Chorritos	Espitia Real, Nueva Santa Rosa
Waterfalls	El Inamo	Estanzuelas, Nueva Santa Rosa
Waterfalls	Las Margaritas Falls	Tecuaco, Oratorio and Ixhuatán
Waterfalls	Osmawal warefal	Tecuamburro
Caves	Los Serafines Cave	Santa Cruz Naranjo
Caves	Cave of El Común	Jumaytepeqe, Nueva Santa Rosa
Caves	La Eduvijes Cave	Santa Rosa de Lima
Beaches	Las Lisas, La Bocabarra and Chapetón	Chiquimulilla
Beaches	Hawaii and Monterrico	Monterrico, Guatemala
Archeological sites
Archeological sites	Casas Viejas, Los Cerritos, Santa María Los Ujuxtales, Colinas de San Osmardín and Santa Clara	Chiquimulilla
Archeological sites	Ixpaco	Pueblo Nuevo Viñas
Archeological sites	Arada Nueva	Oratorio
Archeological sites	El Jobo y Tacuilula	Taxisco

== See also ==
- List of places in Guatemala

== Notes and references ==
=== Bibliography ===
- Ambraseys, Nicholas; Adams, Robin A. (2001). The Seismicity of Central America; a descriptive catalogue 1898-1995. World Scientific. p. 309. ISBN 9781860942440.
- SEGEPLAN (n.d.). "Municipios del departamento de Santa Rosa". SEGEPLAN (in Spanish). Guatemala. Archived from the original on July 7, 2015.
