= Nueva Santa Rosa =

Coordinates: 14.3811°N 90.2761°W

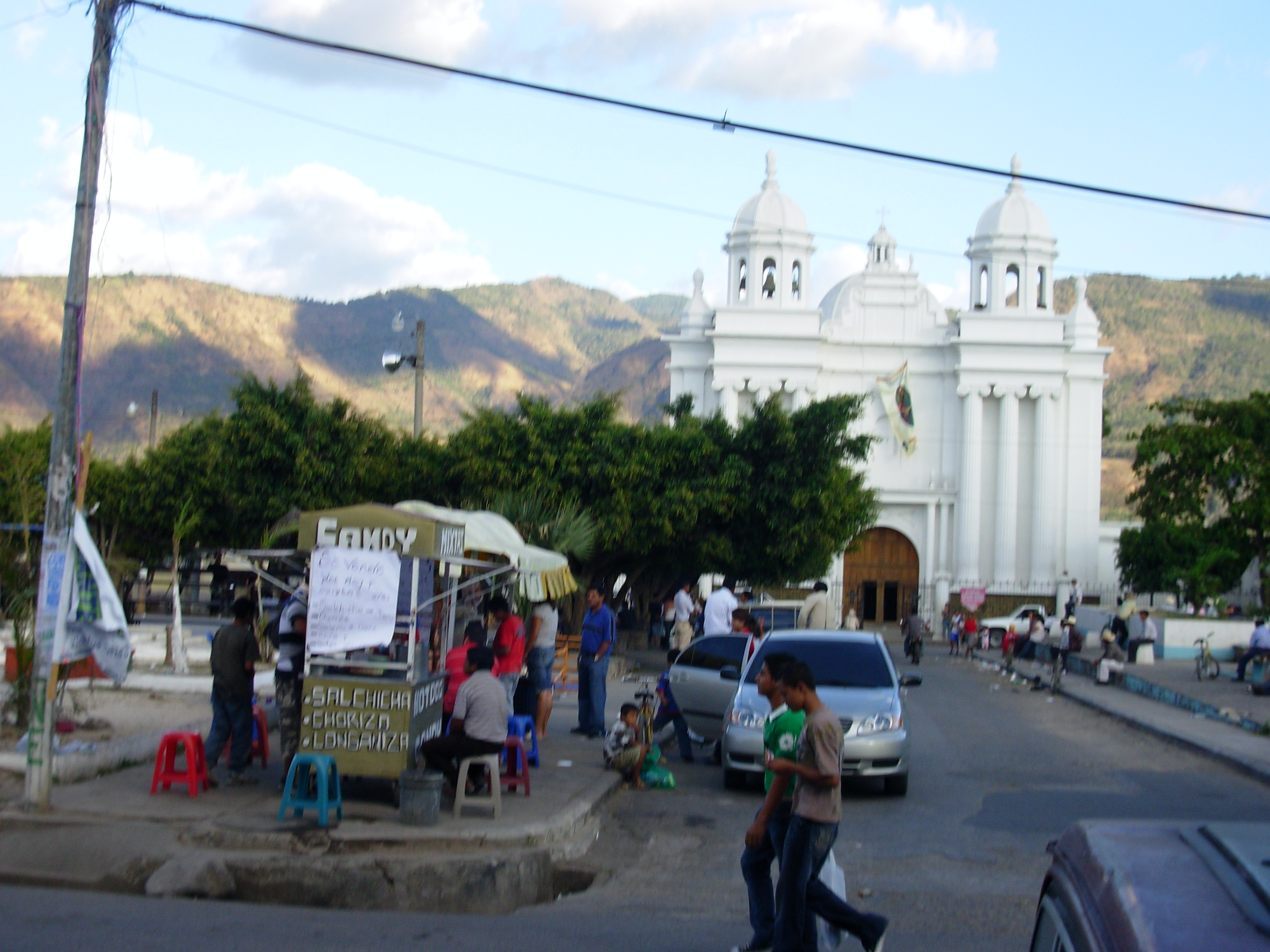
Catholic church in Nueva Santa Rosa

Nueva Santa Rosa (Spanish pronunciation: [ˈnweβa ˈsanta ˈrosa]) is a town and municipality in the Santa Rosa department of Guatemala. The municipality has a population of 36,464 (2018 census) and cover an area of 147 km^{2}.

The town of Nueva Santa Rosa is located 70 miles (110 km) from Guatemala City and has a population of 13,535 (2018 census). Surrounding cities include El Riachuelo, El chupadero, Palin, El Valle, Chapas, Espitia Real, and Jumay.

== History ==
Nueva Santa Rosa is a city located in the northern part of the Department of Santa Rosa, Guatemala Santa Rosa Department, Guatemala. On May 22, 1917, during the presidency of Manuel Estrada Cabrera (1898-1920), it was designated as a municipality by a government accord. History tells us that before becoming a municipality it was given the name VILLAGE OF THE EASTERN BORDERS by its neighbors but is currently known as Nueva Santa Rosa. It is at an altitude of 1,001.25 meters above sea level. It is located at 14°22’50’ latitud, 90°17’10’’ longitud according to the National Geographic Institute. The city’s altitude reaches up to 1,845 meters S.N.M. at the Linda Vista hill. According to the Population and Housing National Census of 2008 administered by the National Institute of Statistics, the city occupies a territory of 67.00 square kilometers and has a population of 32,727 inhabitants. The majority of the population (52%) is between the ages of 15 and 64 years old.

== Location ==
The city of Nueva Santa Rosa is located 30 kilometers from the department of Cuilapa and 75 km from the capital city of Guatemala, Guatemala City. It is located in a region called the volcanic highlands, its soil is of volcanic origin (pumice) [link: pumice]. Rainfall is between 1,100 and 1,350 millimeters per year, with an average temperature of 23 degrees Celsius and a minimum temperature of 10 degrees Celsius. The land is hilly with slopes that do not reach a slope greater than 20%.

At the northern border lie the cities of Casillas and San Rafael las Flores, at the Southern and Eastern borders lie the department head of Cuilapa and located on its western border are the cities Santa Rosa de Lima and Santa Cruz Naranjo.

== Language ==
Spanish is the official language of Guatemala, however only 60% of the population are native Spanish speakers. The other 40% are speakers of one of the 28 native dialects which fall into five language categories; quiche, mam, pocomam, chol and the mayan family of languages. This family of languages consists of Carib, Kekchi, Garifuna, Cakchiquel and Xinca. The last of these languages, Xinca, is an ancient language spoken only in the department of Santa Rosa.

While Spanish is currently the primary language spoken throughout Guatemala, Nueva Santa Rosa is home to the ancestors of Mayan peoples who spoke Xincan, a now extinct language completely unrelated to any other language in the region. The language consists of four distinct classes and was supposedly only spoken in the department of Santa Rosa. Presently two of those four languages are completely extinct while there are 2 to 3 semi speakers of the other two. Today there are indigenous peoples who identify as Xinca but do not have a descriptive source of the ancient Xincan language.
