= Santa Rosa de Lima, Santa Rosa =

Municipality of Santa Rosa, Guatemala

Coordinates: 14°23′N 90°18′W

Santa Rosa de Lima (Spanish pronunciation: [ˈsanta ˈrosa ðe ˈlima]) is one of the 14 municipalities in the Santa Rosa department of Guatemala. It had 18,019 inhabitants in 2012.
