= Chiquimulilla =

Chiquimulilla Xan Tz'eje (Xinca)
- Municipality
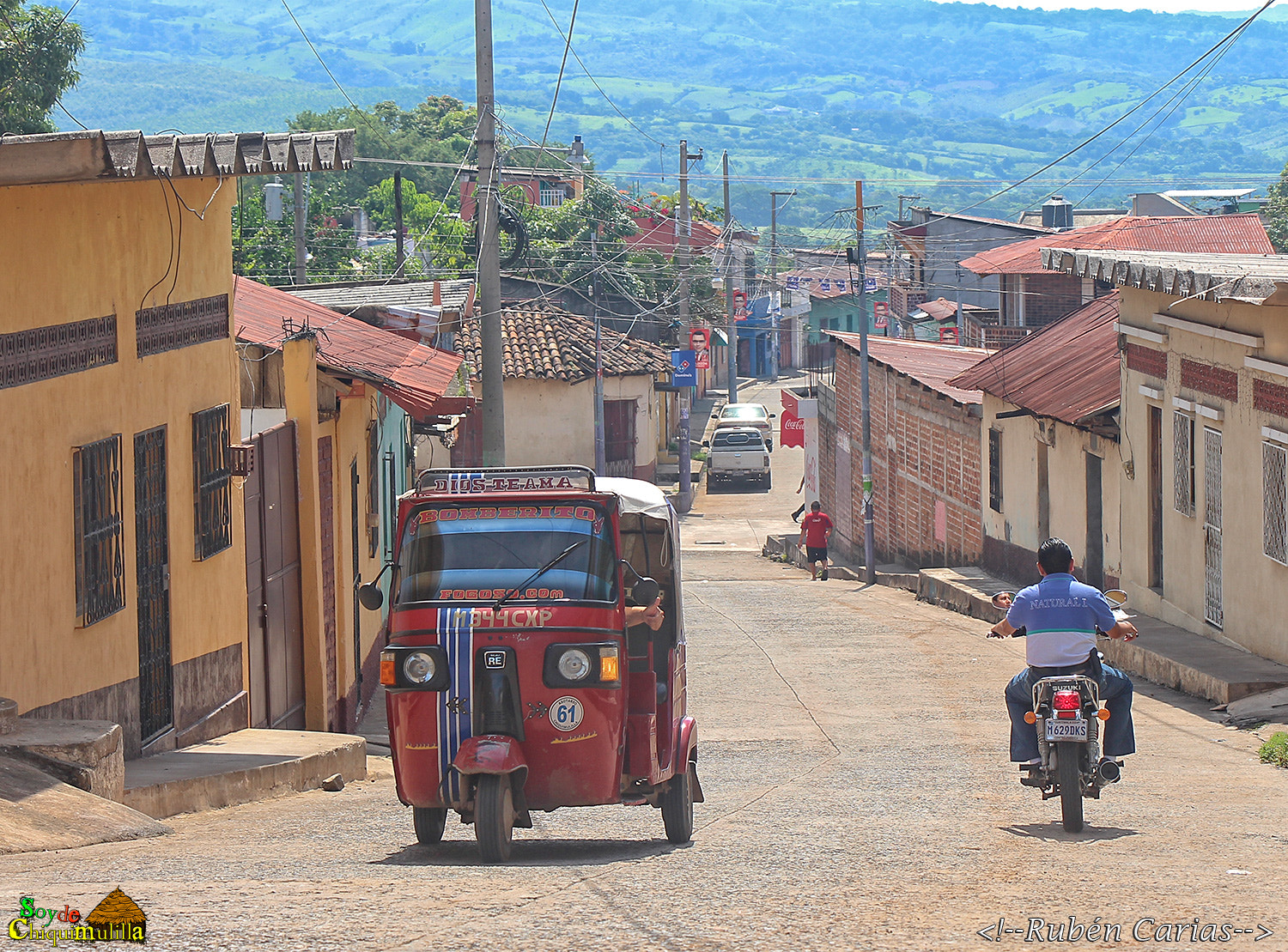
- Barrio San Sebastián

- Location in Guatemala Chiquimulilla (Santa Rosa Department)
- Coordinates: 14°05′N 90°23′W
- Country: Guatemala
- Department: Santa Rosa

Area
  - Total: 221 sq mi (573 km^{2})
- Elevation: 892 ft (272 m)

Population (2023 est.)
  - Total: 66,781
  - Density: 302/sq mi (117/km^{2})
- Climate: Aw

Chiquimulilla (Yupiltepeque Xinca: Xan Tz'eje) is a town and municipality in the Santa Rosa department of Guatemala. It is located about 20 kilometres (12 mi) from the Pacific coast.

The town is an important regional trade location and junction. The most important products are leather goods. The town of Chiquimulilla had a population of 18,848 at the time of the 2018 census.

Some descendants of the Xinca people live in the adjacent area. This ethnicity was almost completely wiped out after the conquest of the Spaniards, mostly from infectious diseases that the Europeans brought along. They do not belong to the Maya ethnicity. Only a handful of elders still know the Xinca language.
