= Santa María Ixhuatán =

Municipality of Santa Rosa, Guatemala

Coordinates: 14°11′N 90°16′W

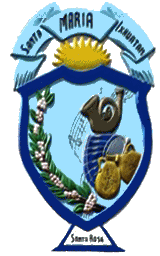
Coat of arms of Santa María Ixhuatán

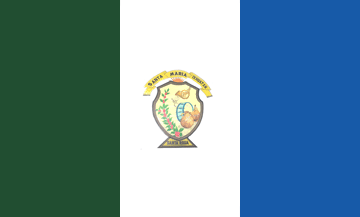
Flag of Santa María Ixhuatán

Santa María Ixhuatán (Xinca: Xam Biya) is a municipality in the Santa Rosa department of Guatemala. It is one of the 14 municipalities of the Santa Rosa department.
