= Taxisco =

Taxisco Xan Guuku (Xinca)
- Municipality

- Location in Guatemala
- Coordinates: 14°04′N 90°28′W
- Country: Guatemala
- Department: Santa Rosa

Area
  - Municipality: 471 km^{2} (182 sq mi)

Population (2018 census)
  - Municipality: 29,846
  - Density: 63.4/km^{2} (164/sq mi)
  - Urban: 9,130

Taxisco (Xinca: Xan Guuku) is a town and municipality in the Santa Rosa department of Guatemala. It is located close to the Pacific Ocean.

Taxisco was the birthplace of Juan José Arévalo, who served as President of the Republic from 1945 to 1951.

Prior to the Spanish Conquest, Taxisco was occupied by the Xinca people.
