= Guazacapán =

Guazacapán Tz'iimaha (Xinca)
- Municipality and town
- Location in Guatemala
- Coordinates: 14°04′N 90°25′W
- Country: Guatemala
- Department: Santa Rosa

Area
  - Municipality and town: 50 sq mi (130 km^{2})

Population (2018 census)
  - Municipality and town: 18,855
  - Density: 380/sq mi (150/km^{2})
  - Urban: 12,195
- Climate: Aw

Guazacapán (Spanish pronunciation: [ɡwasakaˈpan]; Xinca: Tz'iimaha) is a town located in Santa Rosa Department in south-west Guatemala. Guazacapán is also the name of the municipality in Santa Rosa Department around the town of Guazacapán. The municipality of Guazacapán covers an area of 130 km^{2} with a population of 18,855, according to the 2018 census.

== History ==
The town dates back to pre-Columbian times, being in existence prior to the arrival of the Spanish Conquistadores in the 16th century.

Guazacapán is known for the supposed witchcraft that used to be widely practiced by the indigenous people. The last of the great wizards, Pedro Dávila, died in 1974, and the craft is quickly being forgotten. There are still a few people who practice "white magic" in Guazacapán.

The Guazacapán area was once inhabited by Xinca, one of Guatemala's indigenous groups. They settled there after the Pipil. Currently, there are efforts being made to teach the ancient Xinca language (Guazacapán) to the newer generations. There is in the town a rich history, and the people who live there keep that history alive through celebrations that incorporate traditional costume, marimba music and folkloric dance.
