= Pasaco =

- Location in Guatemala
- Coordinates: 13°59′N 90°12′W
- Country: Guatemala
- Department: Jutiapa
- Climate: Aw

Pasaco (Spanish pronunciation: [paˈsako]; Xinca: Xan Paxa') is a municipality in the Jutiapa department of Guatemala, located near the Pacific Ocean on the Border with El Salvador.

== History ==
It was originally formed when a group of Aztecs broke off at the arrival of Hernán Cortés, and went further south into what is now Guatemala (then Coahtemalan, or The Land of Abundance, in a Mayan dialect). They united with some groups of Indians, pushing others into what is now El Salvador and recognizing Cortés as an enemy. Unfortunately, they sat up near the ocean, and were soon spotted by Pedro de Alvarado, who Hernán Cortés had sent to destroy the cultures and civilizations further south. After planting poisonous sticks in the ground, which were nearly always fatal, and about what Pedro de Alvarado complains about loudly in his diary, the Spanish departed southward, and Pasaco, or rather Paxa at that time, moved somewhat inland. After being flooded out, they moved location to Pasaco, or literally, “goodbye Paxa” where the town remains to this day.

== Transportation ==
Until recently there were no cars nor transportation to Pasaco, and the people had to walk about 5 km inland to reach the town, although there is now a paved road into town, and even a small public library.
