= Pueblo Nuevo Viñas =

Municipality of Santa Rosa, Guatemala

Coordinates: 14°14′N 90°28′W

Pueblo Nuevo Viñas is a municipality in the Santa Rosa department in south-eastern Guatemala.
