= San Rafael Las Flores =

Municipality of Santa Rosa, Guatemala

Coordinates: 14.4814°N 90.1733°W

San Rafael Las Flores is a municipality in the Santa Rosa Department in southeastern Guatemala. As of 2020, it had a population of 13,620.

The El Escobal silver mine, operated by Pan American Silver, is nearby. The community of San Rafael Las Flores has been heavily involved in the Escobal mine protests.
