= Cuilapa =

- Municipality of Guatemala
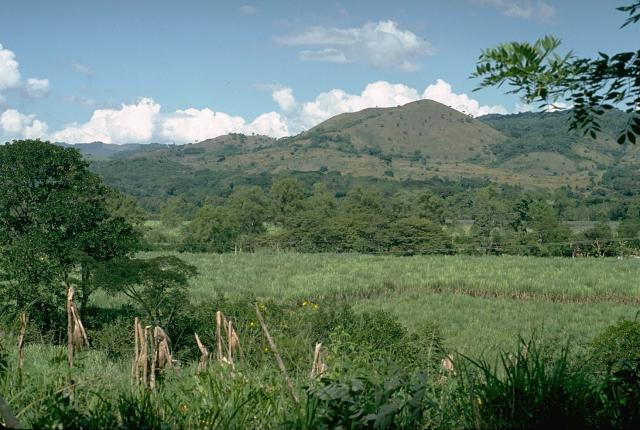
- Cuilapa-Barbarena volcanic field

- Location in Guatemala Cuilapa (Santa Rosa Department)
- Coordinates: 14°17′N 90°18′W
- Country: Guatemala
- Department: Santa Rosa

Government
  - Mayor (2016-2020): Esvin Fernando Marroquín Túpas

Area
  - Total: 72 sq mi (187 km^{2})

Population (2018 census)
  - Total: 41,359
  - Density: 573/sq mi (221/km^{2})
- Climate: Aw

Cuilapa, also known as Santa Rosa Cuilapa, is a town, with a population of 41,359 (2018 census), in Guatemala. It serves as the capital of the department of Santa Rosa and as the administrative seat for the surrounding municipality of Cuilapa.

Cuilapa marks the geographic center of the Americas.

== History ==
=== 1913 earthquake ===
On Saturday 8 March 1913, a magnitude 6.4 earthquake hit Santa Rosa, destroying its department capital, Cuilapa. Both the initial quake and the aftershocks destroyed a lot of private homes, and also the cathedral and the prison, leaving behind significant human losses; similar destruction occurred at Barberena, Cerro Redondo, Llano Grande and El Zapote. Fraijanes, Pueblo Nuevo Viñas, Coatepeque and Jalpatagua were also affected. Around Cuilapa, there were landslides and road blockades, and even a long crack was reported at Los Esclavos hill.

== Climate ==
Cuilapa has a tropical savanna climate (Köppen: Aw).

Climate data for Amatitlán
Month	Jan	Feb	Mar	Apr	May	Jun	Jul	Aug	Sep	Oct	Nov	Dec	Year
Mean daily maximum °C (°F)	28.4 (83.1)	28.8 (83.8)	29.8 (85.6)	29.7 (85.5)	29.3 (84.7)	28.2 (82.8)	29.0 (84.2)	28.7 (83.7)	28.0 (82.4)	28.0 (82.4)	27.9 (82.2)	27.8 (82.0)	28.6 (83.5)
Daily mean °C (°F)	22.7 (72.9)	22.9 (73.2)	23.9 (75.0)	24.3 (75.7)	24.4 (75.9)	23.9 (75.0)	24.3 (75.7)	24.1 (75.4)	23.7 (74.7)	23.3 (73.9)	22.9 (73.2)	22.5 (72.5)	23.6 (74.4)
Mean daily minimum °C (°F)	17.0 (62.6)	17.1 (62.8)	18.0 (64.4)	19.0 (66.2)	19.5 (67.1)	19.6 (67.3)	19.6 (67.3)	19.5 (67.1)	19.4 (66.9)	18.7 (65.7)	17.9 (64.2)	17.2 (63.0)	18.5 (65.4)
Average rainfall mm (inches)	2 (0.1)	3 (0.1)	11 (0.4)	50 (2.0)	226 (8.9)	374 (14.7)	302 (11.9)	287 (11.3)	353 (13.9)	255 (10.0)	61 (2.4)	8 (0.3)	1,932 (76)
Source: Climate-Data.org

== Geographic location ==
Cuilapa is surrounded by Santa Rosa Department municipalities, except by East where it borders Jutiapa:

== Notable people ==
- Erick Lemus, professional footballer
- Carlos Mejía, professional footballer

== See also ==
- List of places in Guatemala

== Notes and references ==
=== Bibliography ===
- Ambraseys, Nicholas; Adams, Robin A. (2001). The Seismicity of Central America; a descriptive catalogue 1898-1995. World Scientific. p. 309. ISBN 9781860942440.
- Escalante Herrera, Marco Antonio (2007). "Breve información del municipio de Cuilapa". Pbase (in Spanish). Guatemala. Archived from the original on February 2, 2009.
