= Casillas, Guatemala =

Casillas
- Municipality
- Location in Guatemala
- Coordinates: 14°25′N 90°15′W
- Country: Guatemala
- Department: Santa Rosa

Area
  - Municipality: 80 sq mi (207 km^{2})

Population (2018 census)
  - Municipality: 24,956
  - Density: 312/sq mi (121/km^{2})
  - Urban: 7,698
- Climate: Aw

Casillas is a town and municipality in the Guatemalan department of Santa Rosa. It serves as the municipal seat for the surrounding municipality of the same name. The town's population was 7,698 at the 2018 census. The spoken language is Spanish.

Nearby villages include El Jute, Minas, Guadalupe, Chapas, San Juan Tapalapa, El Palmar. The nearest town is Nueva Santa Rosa.

The population is mainly Roman Catholic and the town's festivities to honour the "Cristo Negro" take place from January 12 to January 16. The fair consists of many events, including dances, a rodeo, and carnival rides.

== Climate ==
The municipality has a warm-temperate climate (Köppen Classification).
