= List of museums in Guatemala =

There is a wide variety of museums in Guatemala, with collections varying from pre-Columbian Mesoamerican artefacts to Spanish colonial art and collections of regional interest.

Museum	Photograph	Municipality	Department	Subject	Summary
Casa de la Cultura Flavio Herrera		Guatemala City	Guatemala Department		
Casa de la Cultura Julio Cesar de la Roca		Quetzaltenango	Quetzaltenango Department		
Casa del Callejón Castillo Hermanos		Guatemala City	Guatemala Department		
CASA Museo Iinternacional de Movimientos Artísticos (Casa M.I.M.A.)		Guatemala City	Guatemala Department	19th century life	
Centro de Visitantes y Museo de Sitio de Iximche		Tecpán Guatemala	Chimaltenango Department	Maya civilization	
Centro de Visitantes y Museo de Sitio de K'umarcaaj		Santa Cruz del Quiché	Quiché Department	Maya civilization	
Centro de Visitantes y Museo de Sitio de Litica, Tikal		Flores	Petén Department	Maya civilization	
Centro de Visitantes y Museo de Sitio de Quiriguá		Los Amates	Izabal Department	Maya civilization	
Centro de Visitantes y Museo de Sitio de Zaculeu		Huehuetenango	Huehuetenango Department	Maya civilization	
Centro de Visitantes y Museo de Sitio Sylvanus G. Morley, Tikal		Flores	Petén Department	Maya civilization	
Mapa en Relieve de Guatemala		Guatemala City	Guatemala Department		
Museo Arqueológico Casa Santo Domingo		Antigua Guatemala	Sacatepéquez Department		
Museo Arquidiócesano de Santiago de Guatemala		Guatemala City	Guatemala Department		
Museo Bodegas de Principios de Siglo XIX		Guatemala City	Guatemala Department		
Museo Casa del Tejido Antiguo		Antigua Guatemala	Sacatepéquez Department		
Museo Casa K'OJOM		Jocotenango	Sacatepéquez Department	Maya music	
Museo Colonial Casa Santo Domingo		Antigua Guatemala	Sacatepéquez Department		
Museo Comunitario "Rabinal Achi"		Rabinal	Baja Verapaz Department		
Museo de Armas de Santiago de los Caballeros		Antigua Guatemala	Sacatepéquez Department	Colonial Guatemala	
Museo de Arte Colonial		Antigua Guatemala	Sacatepéquez Department		
Museo de Arte Guatemalteco Primitivo-Contemporaneo		Antigua Guatemala	Sacatepéquez Department	Modern Maya art	This museum is dedicated to the display of contemporary art by modern Maya artists of Kaqchikel and Tz'utujil ethnicity, and twelved themed exhibitions on Guatemalan folklore, housed within a period building close to Antigua's central park.
Museo de Artes y Artesanías Populares de Sacatepéquez		Antigua Guatemala	Sacatepéquez Department		
Museo de Historia Natural de la USAC		Guatemala City	Guatemala Department		
Museo de la Farmacia de Guatemala		Antigua Guatemala	Sacatepéquez Department		
Museo de la Universidad de San Carlos		Guatemala City	Guatemala Department		
Museo de los Niños		Guatemala City	Guatemala Department	Children's museum	
Museo de Semana Santa		Guatemala City	Guatemala Department		
Museo del Café		Jocotenango	Sacatepéquez Department	Coffee production	This private museum is situated in a former coffee mill and preserves the original late 19th century machinery, including its water wheel. The museum was founded in 2000 as part of the Centro Cultural La Azotea. The exhibition covers all stages of coffee production including cultivation, harvest, roasting and trade. The collection includes milling machines from different parts of the world. The museum also includes educational materials such as production statistics for the most important coffee producing countries. Facilities include a shop and cafeteria The grounds of the museum include a working plantation producing coffee that is processed on-site for sale to visitors.
Museo del Ferrocarril		Guatemala City	Guatemala Department	Railway	
Museo del Jade y Semana Santa		Antigua Guatemala	Sacatepéquez Department		
Museo del Libro Antiguo		Antigua Guatemala	Sacatepéquez Department		
Museo Fray Francisco Vázquez		Guatemala City	Guatemala Department		
Museo Heráldico y de Armas del Ejercito		Guatemala City	Guatemala Department		
Museo Itinerante de Ciencia y Tecnología		Guatemala City	Guatemala Department	Science museum	
Museo Ixchel del Traje Indígena		Guatemala City	Guatemala Department	Maya textiles	
Museo Katinamit		San Cristóbal Verapaz	Alta Verapaz Department		
Museo Miraflores		Guatemala City	Guatemala Department		
Museo Nacional de Arqueología y Etnología		Guatemala City	Guatemala Department		
Museo Nacional de Arte Moderno					
Museo Nacional de Historia					
Museo Nacional de Historia Natural					
Museo Nacional de Historia Natural "JORGE A. IBARRA"					
Museo Numimastico de Guatemala					
Estanzuela Museum of Paleontology and Archaeology		Estanzuela	Zacapa Department		
Museo Popol Vuh		Guatemala City	Guatemala Department		
Museo Postal y Filatelico					
Museo Regional de Arqueología de la Democracia		La Democracia	Escuintla Department	Monte Alto culture	
Museo Regional de Arqueología Santiago		Coatepeque	Quetzaltenango Department	Pre-Columbian archaeology	
Museo Regional de Chichicastenango		Chichicastenango	Quiché Department	History, archaeology and ethnology	
Museo Regional de Santiago Sacatepéquez		Santiago Sacatepéquez	Sacatepéquez Department	Archaeology and ethnology	
Museo Regional del Sureste de Petén		Dolores	Petén Department	Maya civilization	
Museo Regional del Trapiche					
Museo San Clemente y Casa de la Cultura					
Museo San Juan del Obispo					
Museo Vical de Arte Precolombino y Vidrio Moderno		Antigua Guatemala	Sacatepéquez Department		
Palacio Nacional de Cultura					
