= Acatenango (disambiguation) =

Acatenango is a stratovolcano in Guatemala.

Acatenango may also refer to:

- Acatenango, Chimaltenango, a municipality in Guatemala
- Acatenango (horse), a German Thoroughbred racehorse
