= Masagua =

- Municipality and town
- Location in Guatemala
- Coordinates: 14°12′00″N 90°51′00″W
- Country: Guatemala
- Department: Escuintla
- Settled: 1825

Area
  - Total: 456 km^{2} (176 sq mi)

Population (2023)
  - Total: 49,085
  - Density: 108/km^{2} (279/sq mi)
- Climate: Aw

Masagua (Spanish pronunciation: [maˈsaɣwa]) is a city and a municipality in the Escuintla department of Guatemala. It covers an area of approximately 456 km^{2} (176 sq mi). As per 2023 estimates, it has a population of about 49,085 inhabitants.

== History ==
The first mention of Masagua is from the Spanish colonial texts, which refer to a church dedicated to Virgin Mary. In the late 18th century, it had a population of 104 individuals from 25 families. In 1825, Masagua became part of the department of Escuintla as per the Constitution of Guatemala. On 1 May 1830, it was elevated as a municipality and the municipality of San Juan Mixtán was added to it in 1883. In 1927, Masagua had a population of 4,830 inhabitants.

Masagua derives from Nahuatl, with several theories proposed as to its meaning. It roughly translates to "place of deer" or "deer that flees".

== Geography ==
Masagua is a municipality in the Escuintla Department in Guatemala. It is spread over an area of 456 km^{2} (176 sq mi). It lies in the southeastern part of the department, about 12 km (7.5 mi) from the departmental capital of Escuintla and 71 km (44 mi) from the national capital of Guatemala city. It borders the municipalities of Escuintla and San Vicente Pacaya to the north, Puerto San José to the south, Guanagazapa and Iztapa to the east. In 2008, a power generation plant was constructed by Jaguar Energy in the municipality with an estimated capacity of 300 MW.

=== Climate ===
Located at an elevation of 100 m (330 ft) above sea level, Masagua has a tropical monsoon climate (Köppen climate classification: Am). The municipality has an average annual temperature of 26.27 °C (79.29 °F), and receives about 124.35 mm (4.896 in) of rainfall annually.

Climate data for Masagua
Month	Jan	Feb	Mar	Apr	May	Jun	Jul	Aug	Sep	Oct	Nov	Dec	Year
Mean daily maximum °C (°F)	33.2 (91.8)	33.6 (92.5)	34.6 (94.3)	34.7 (94.5)	34.0 (93.2)	32.7 (90.9)	33.0 (91.4)	32.9 (91.2)	32.0 (89.6)	31.9 (89.4)	32.2 (90.0)	32.7 (90.9)	33.1 (91.6)
Daily mean °C (°F)	26.6 (79.9)	27.1 (80.8)	28.2 (82.8)	28.7 (83.7)	28.7 (83.7)	27.9 (82.2)	28.1 (82.6)	27.9 (82.2)	27.4 (81.3)	26.8 (80.2)	26.8 (80.2)	26.7 (80.1)	27.6 (81.6)
Mean daily minimum °C (°F)	20.1 (68.2)	20.6 (69.1)	21.9 (71.4)	22.7 (72.9)	23.4 (74.1)	23.2 (73.8)	23.3 (73.9)	23.0 (73.4)	22.8 (73.0)	21.7 (71.1)	21.4 (70.5)	20.7 (69.3)	22.1 (71.7)
Average precipitation mm (inches)	4 (0.2)	4 (0.2)	19 (0.7)	76 (3.0)	273 (10.7)	394 (15.5)	317 (12.5)	219 (8.6)	451 (17.8)	399 (15.7)	81 (3.2)	10 (0.4)	2,247 (88.5)
Source: Climate-Data.org

== Demographics ==
The municipality had an estimated population of 49,085 inhabitants in 2023. The population consisted of 25,242 males and 23,843 females. About 30.2% of the population was below the age of fourteen, and 5.2% was over the age of 65 years. Majority of the population (62.9%) was classified as urban, while 37.1% lived in rural areas. About 66.2% of the inhabitants were born in the same municipality. Ladinos (97.1%) formed the major ethnic group, with Maya (2.8%) forming a small minority. The municipality had a literacy rate of 84.9%, and Spanish (98.4%) was the most spoken language.
