= Potbelly sculpture =

Mesoamerican sculptures of obese people

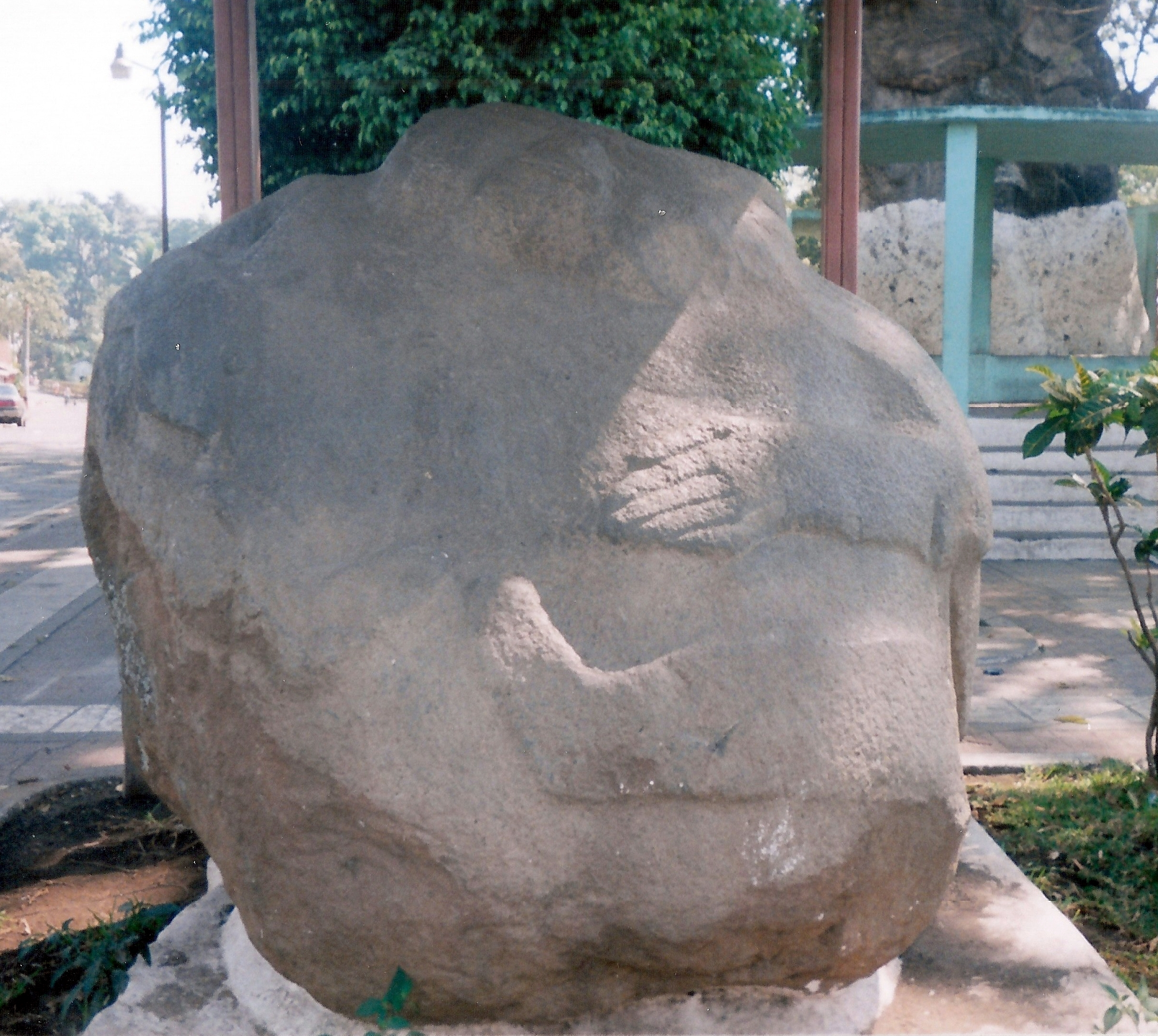
A potbelly sculpture from Monte Alto in Guatemala, on display in the plaza of La Democracia

Potbelly sculptures (Spanish barrigones pl. or barrigón sing.) are in-the-round sculptures of obese human figures carved from boulders. They are a distinctive element of the sculptural tradition in the southern Maya area of Mesoamerica. The precise purpose of potbelly sculptures is unknown, although they appear to have been the focus of public veneration and ritual directed by the ruling elite. Although this sculptural tradition is found within the southern Maya area, it has been recognized that the sculptures themselves are non-Maya.

== Description ==
Potbelly monuments are generally crude in-the-round sculptures of extremely fat human figures; they are usually seated cross-legged and have enormous swollen stomachs gripped in the figure's arms and legs. The heads are round and normally have the eyes closed and possess puffy eyelids and prominent lips. The monuments are generally of indeterminate gender and are usually carved from porphyritic basalt, a kind of rock with a combination of large and small grains of mineral that is common along the foothills of Central America. There are occasional examples of potbelly figures crafted from other materials, such as pottery or from other types of rock.

There are variations on the potbelly theme including complete potbelly sculptures, headless potbellies, some of which may be deliberately headless, and potbelly sculptures that consist of only a bodiless head that are recognised as belonging to the style even though they have no potbelly body. Some potbelly sculptures are wearing collars or clothing while others are apparently naked. There are examples with very prominent navels while other sculptures have no emphasis on the navel at all. Some examples of potbelly sculpture have chest ornaments and some sculptures are seated on pedestals. There are examples of potbelly sculptures corresponding to the general type that are not so fat as is the norm.

Potbelly sculptures vary enormously in size and weight, from the smallest examples that can weigh as little as a few grams and measure 4 centimetres (1.6 in) to monuments that weigh 12 tons and measure 2 metres (6.6 ft).

== Dating ==
The dating of potbelly sculptures has been problematic with few of the earlier known sculptures being found in their original context. Investigators from the 1950s through to the 1970s argued that the style was Olmec derived or perhaps pre-Olmec. Olmec culture is judged to have lasted from 1500 BC through to 400 BC based on radiocarbon dating. Investigations at Santa Leticia were focused on answering the dating problem and securely dated Santa Leticia Monuments 1 and 3 to between 500 BC and AD 100 using a combination of radiocarbon dating and ceramic evidence.

The dating of the monuments to the Late Preclassic indicate that the potbelly style may be a later derivative of earlier Olmec colossal heads, although it does not answer the question of the ethnicity of the sculptors. Potbelly monuments were sometimes reused by later peoples in the region, such as at Sin Cabezas, Copán and Teopán. Arguing against the theory of potbelly sculpture being an Olmec influenced art form is that the direction of diffusion of the style appears to have been from south to north, while the Olmec heartland lies to the north, on the coast of the Gulf of Mexico, which would indicate an expected diffusion from north to south if the Olmecs were indeed the origin of the style.

== Interpretation ==
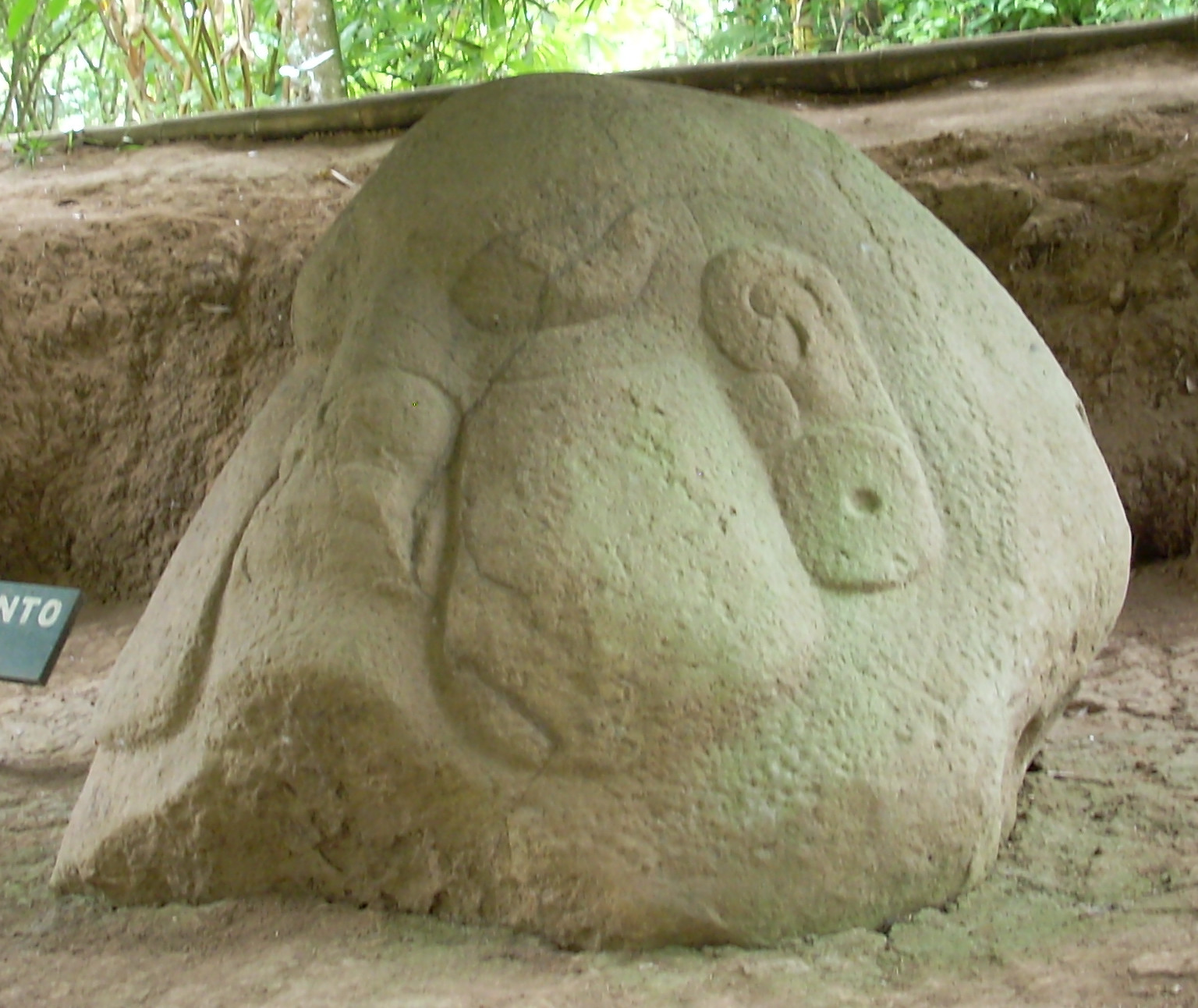
Takalik Abaj Monument 99, a potbelly style colossal head with a puffed face suggestive of a bloated cadaver.

Potbelly sculptures have been interpreted in a variety of manners. Investigators have theorised that potbelly sculptures represent dead ancestors. Alternatively, they have been associated with babies or with the poorly understood Fat God of Mesoamerican mythology. Potbelly monuments have also been associated with a group of supernatural entities associated with the domestic hearth. A further interpretation, based on the sculpture found at Teopán in western El Salvador, interprets potbelly figures as pregnant women at full term, possibly in the very act of giving birth.

One theory is that the sculptures represent deceased individuals with bloated bodies, closed eyes, distended bellies and puffed out faces. The position of the limbs on some monuments, although following the natural contours of the boulder, give an impression of the position of corpses found in later Maya burial bundles. It is possible that Pasaco Monument 2 and the potbelly from San Juan Sacatepéquez portray the placement of a jade bead in the mouth of the sculpture. Although it has been suggested that the monuments themselves are burial markers, only three sculptures have been found directly associated with human remains. One of these is a ceramic potbelly from Colha in Belize, the others are from Chalchuapa and Kaminaljuyu. However, since most potbelly monuments were not found in their original locations it is impossible to know whether they originally served as burial markers.

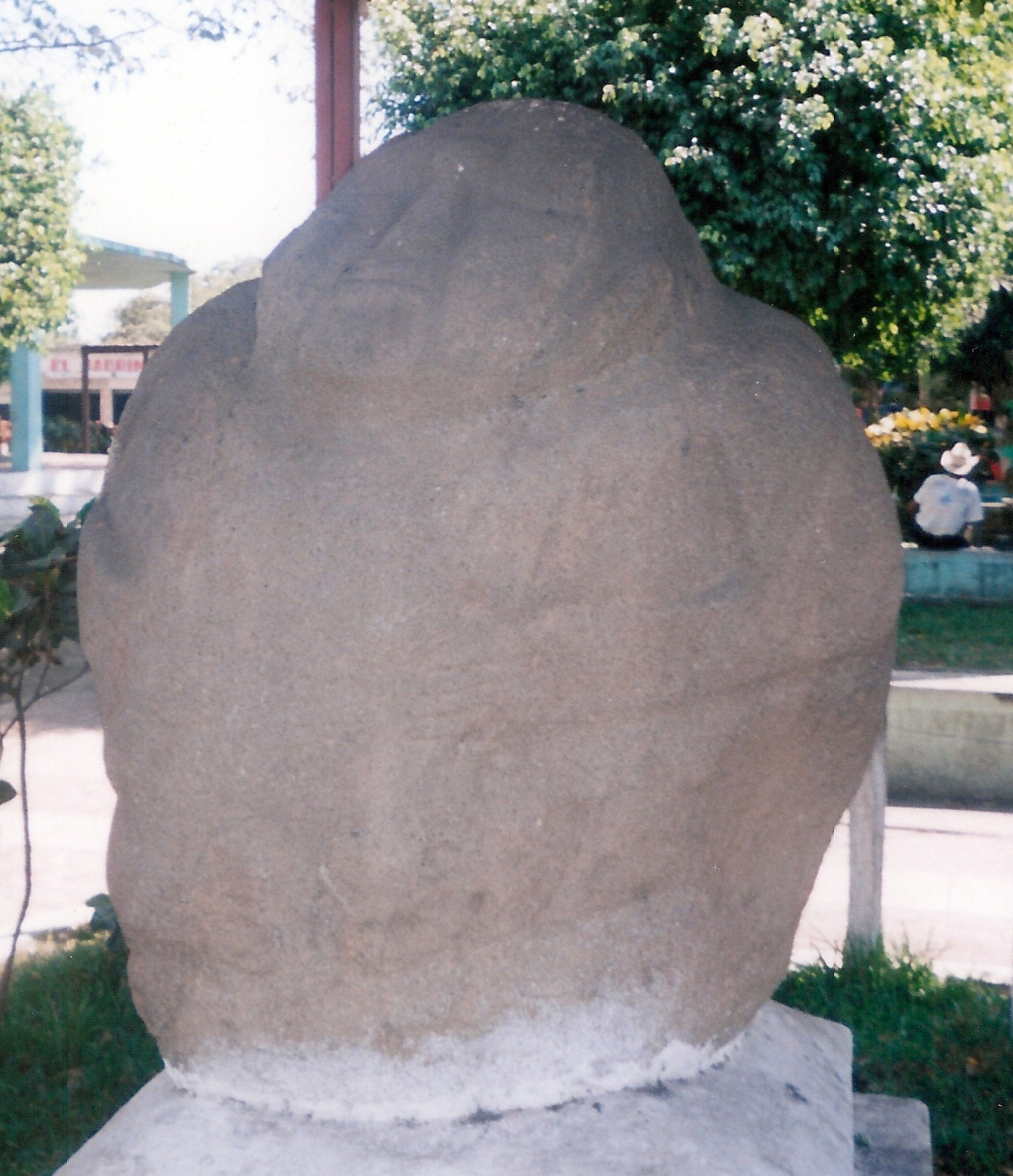
A potbelly sculpture from Monte Alto, on display in La Democracia

An alternative interpretation of potbelly monuments is that they were representations of rulership. This is suggested by the body position represented in the sculptures, the type of adornment sometimes depicted on them, the pedestals on which they sometimes sit and the ceremonial sites where they are found as well as their locations within such sites. The potbelly body position is symbolic of rulership; the figures are seated cross-legged and with the arms wrapping the body or holding an object. Twenty-five potbelly monuments are known to display a collar as neck jewellery, again suggestive of rulership. Pedestal bases are known from potbelly sculptures from Sin Cabezas, Antigua Guatemala, Kaminaljuyu, Santa Cruz del Quiché, Takalik Abaj, Tikal, Ujuxte, El Balsamo, Los Cerritos and La Nueva in Guatemala, Chalchuapa in El Salvador, and Copán in Honduras. This represents 42% of sites with potbelly sculptures. If pedestals are equivalent to thrones then Bilbao Monument 58 is also relevant, which was found associated with a four-legged stone altar or throne and may originally have been positioned on top of it.

The diversity of monuments falling within the potbelly sculptural tradition and the individuality of the monuments support the argument that the monuments represent individual rulers. The monuments may have been viewed by the ancient peoples of the region as a depiction of both rulership and their ancestors.

== Distribution ==
The Pacific coastal zone of southern Mesoamerica showing the core of the potbelly distribution zone.

Potbelly sculptures are distributed along the Pacific slope of southern Mesoamerica from Chiapas in Mexico, through Guatemala to El Salvador, as well as in the Guatemalan highlands. A few examples have been found further afield in the Maya lowlands of Guatemala and Honduras. A ceramic potbelly figure was found as far away as Colha in northern Belize and has been dated to c.880–600 BC, in the Middle Preclassic.

Area	No. of monuments	%
Chiapas (Pacific slope)	4	4%
Guatemala (Pacific slope)	51	55%
Guatemala (highlands)	19	21%
El Salvador (Pacific slope)	8	8%
Maya lowlands	5	5%
unknown	6	7%

The core of the distribution area falls within a humid piedmont zone with the land consisting of volcanic soil and rubble carried down from the mountains, with naturally occurring basalt boulders of varying sizes that provided a practical raw material for sculpture. Potbelly sculptures are found in prominent ceremonial centres.

=== Chiapas (Mexico) ===
Site	No. of monuments
Izapa	1
La Unidad	2
Tonala-Tapanatepec	1

=== Guatemala ===
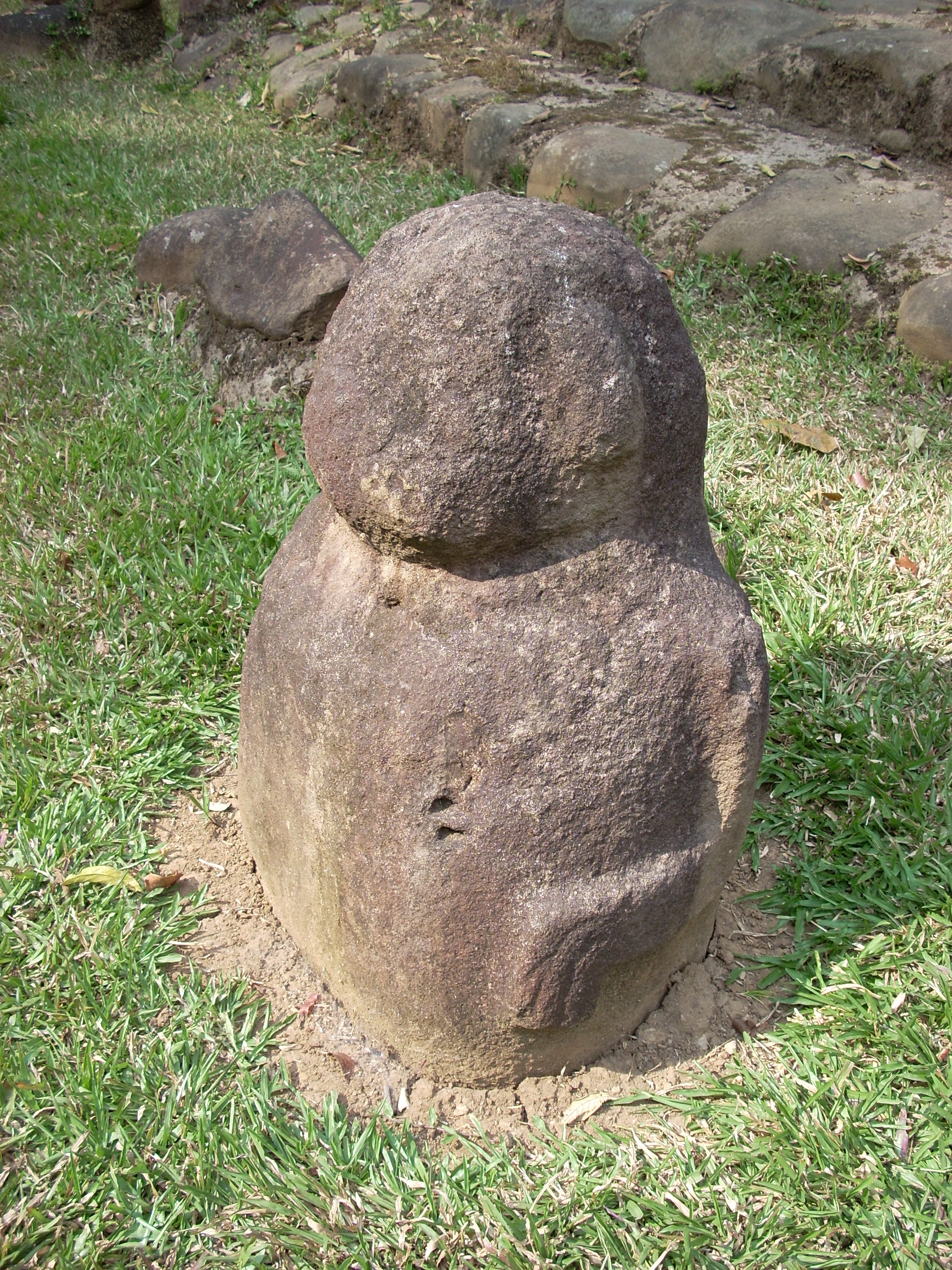
Monument 109 at Takalik Abaj, a small potbelly sculpture.

Examples have been found at many sites on the Pacific coast of Guatemala including Takalik Abaj, Monte Alto, Bilbao and El Baúl. The earliest examples of potbellied monuments have been dated to the Middle Preclassic, with the majority dating to the Late Preclassic.

Well-preserved examples of Late Preclassic potbelly sculptures have been found at Bilbao, on the coastal plain, and at Kaminaljuyu in the Guatemalan highlands. A small potbelly monument has been found at the major Maya city of Tikal in the lowlands of Petén in Guatemala.

Zone	Site	No. of monuments
Highlands	Antigua Guatemala	1
Highlands	Kaminaljuyu	15
Highlands	Lake Atitlan	1
Highlands	San Juan Sacatepéquez	1
Highlands	Santa Cruz del Quiché	1
Pacific coast	El Balsamo	1
Pacific coast	El Baúl	1
Pacific coast	Bilbao	3
Pacific coast	Chiquimulilla	5
Pacific coast	Los Cerritos	3
Pacific coast	Chocolá	1
Pacific coast	La Concepción	3
Pacific coast	Finca Solola (Tiquisate)	3
Pacific coast	Giralda	2
Pacific coast	La Gomera	3
Pacific coast	Monte Alto	6
Pacific coast	La Nueva	2
Pacific coast	Obero	2
Pacific coast	Pasaco	2
Pacific coast	Sin Cabezas	4
Pacific coast	Takalik Abaj	8–11
Pacific coast	Ujuxte	2
Maya lowlands	San Bartolo	1
Maya lowlands	Tikal	1

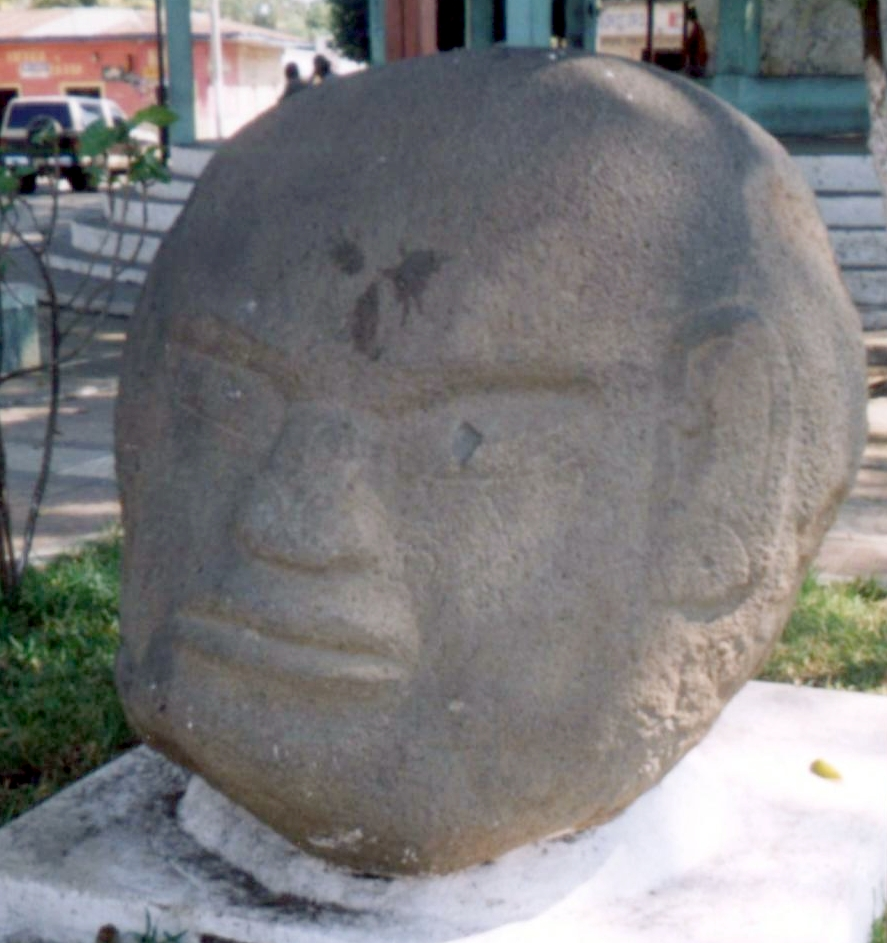
Colossal head in potbelly style on display in La Democracia, Escuintla and originally from Monte Alto.

There is some variation in the exact features, those at Kaminaljuyu have fat bodies with short, thick necks and large heads, sometimes wearing a wide collar. The faces are depicted with incised lines and are heavy and coarse. The legs curve around the body parallel to the ground and the arms are clasped against the torso with the elbows bent. Kaminaljuyu has the greatest concentration of potbelly sculptures in any site, with several of them found concentrated in the Palangana monument plaza.

Large potbelly monuments have been found at Giralda, a site 6 kilometres (3.7 mi) from the Pacific coastline.

Potbelly sculptures from Sin Cabezas are stylistically related to Olmec sculpture but were reused by later peoples, being found in fill dating to the Late Classic period. The monuments at Sin Cabezas were headless when they were found and no fragments of the missing heads were evident, suggesting that they had already been damaged when they were re-erected by later occupants of the site.

At Takalik Abaj the potbelly style monuments all date to the Late Preclassic. Stylistically, the monuments are very similar to those of Kaminaljuyu and Monte Alto. Seven monuments are potbelly sculptures (Monuments 2, 3, 19, 40, 69, 94 and 117), six of these represent complete figures. Three monuments are small potbelly sculptures (Monuments 100, 107 and 109) and one sculpture is a colossal head in potbelly style (Monument 99).

One potbelly sculpture was found in Chocolá, Guatemala.

=== Honduras ===
At Copán in Honduras, another important Maya site, archaeologists found a potbelly sculpture on top of the Northwest Platform, to the west of the Great Plaza. Another was found in a cache under Stela 4. Further potbelly monuments have been found in caches under Late Classic stelae in the Great Plaza itself and throughout the Copán valley.

Site	No. of monuments
Copán	2+

=== El Salvador ===
A small example excavated from underneath the Late Preclassic levels of Structure E3-1 at Chalchuapa in El Salvador may date to the Middle Preclassic. Three potbelly monuments were found resting on a large terrace in Santa Leticia in El Salvador, a site near Chalchuapa consisting of various mounds and platforms. These monuments were large and especially obese. Santa Leticia Monuments 1 and 3 were important in securely dating the potbelly style of sculpture. The El Salvador potbellies conform to the Monte Alto style of boulder sculpture.

Site	No. of monuments
Chalchuapa	1
Santa Leticia	3
Teopán	1

Santa Leticia Monument 1 is a nearly spherical potbelly sculpture and the smallest of the three potbelly monuments at the site, measuring 1.6 metres (5.2 ft) high. Monument 2 is a massive 2-metre (6.6 ft) high potbelly that has been split in half down the middle. Monument 3 is a finely carved potbelly figure with stylistic affinities to some of the sculptures found at Monte Alto in Guatemala, it measures 1.8 metres (5.9 ft) high. All three sculptures measured 1.5 to 2 metres (4.9 to 6.6 ft) in height and diameter. The monuments were arranged in a north-south line on a 70-metre (230 ft) wide terrace projecting from a hill, Cerrito de Apaneca.

While one review of the distribution of potbelly sculptures cites an example from Cara Sucia, in reality no such monuments are known from that site.

The Teopán potbelly clearly represents a female figure and has been interpreted as the sculpture of a Late Preclassic earth goddess. Teopán itself is a small site located on an island in Lake Coatepeque in western El Salvador. The site has been identified as that of Late Preclassic Maya settlement. Although the Teopán sculpture has typical Monte Alto-style traits such as closed puffy eyes, no neck, wrap-around arms, a clearly marked naval and grooves forming portions of the nose and mouth, it also includes some unusual features such as clearly indicated breasts, wide hips, buttocks and a 10-centimetre (3.9 in) concavity below the legs. The closed eyelids were later re-carved with the addition of two irregular oval concavities in order to represent open eyes, probably in the Postclassic Period. The Teopán potbelly is likely to be the idol mentioned by Spanish Colonial official Diego García de Palacio in a letter written in 1576, in which he mentions that the Pipil natives on the island worshipped "a large stone idol in the form of a woman".

== See also ==
- Stone spheres of Costa Rica
