= Iztapa =

Iztapa Ystapa

- Location in Guatemala
- Coordinates: 13°55′59″N 90°42′27″W
- Country: Guatemala
- Department: Escuintla

Area
  - Total: 54.3 sq mi (140.6 km^{2})

Population
  - Total: 20,697
  - Density: 381.3/sq mi (147.2/km^{2})
- Climate: Am

Iztapa (Spanish pronunciation: [isˈtapa]), or Puerto de Iztapa, is a city and a municipality in the Escuintla department of Guatemala. It covers an area of approximately 381.3 km^{2} (147.2 sq mi). As per 2023 estimates, it has a population of about 20,697 inhabitants.

== History ==
When the Spanish colonialists arrived in 1527, Iztapa was already an existing settlement, and Don Pedro de Alvarado commissioned three ships to be built at the port of Iztapa for his subsequent expedition to Peru. The port underwent further work in the late 16th century. On 18 February 1824, a commercial port was established under the name of "Puerto Independencia", which was moved later in the mid 19th century. On 15 March 1833, the government established Iztapa officially and allocated six thousand pesos for the same. As per further decree on 30 April 1834, further land was allocated to develop the cavalry and a road connecting Iztapa and Escuintla. British records from 1850 refer to the place as Yetapa. In 1897, president José María Reina Barrios attempted to build an inter-oceanic railroad to attract investors during the Central America Expo, which included a new terminal at the Iztapa Port.

== Geography ==
Iztapa is a municipality in the Escuintla Department in Guatemala. It is spread over an area of 381.3 km^{2} (147.2 sq mi). It lies in the southern part of the department, about 55 km (34 mi) from the departmental capital of Escuintla and 130 km (81 mi) from the national capital of Guatemala city. It borders the municipalities of Guanagazapa to the north, Taxisco to the east, Masagua and Puerto San José to the west, and the Pacific Ocean to the south. Iztapa is considered to be one of the best places in the world to catch Sailfish.

=== Climate ===
Iztapa has a tropical monsoon climate (Köppen climate classification: Am). The municipality has an average annual temperature of 25.79 °C (78.42 °F), and receives about 122.06 mm (4.806 in) of rainfall annually.

Climate data for Iztapa
Month	Jan	Feb	Mar	Apr	May	Jun	Jul	Aug	Sep	Oct	Nov	Dec	Year
Mean daily maximum °C (°F)	32.1 (89.8)	32.5 (90.5)	33.1 (91.6)	33.2 (91.8)	32.7 (90.9)	31.9 (89.4)	32.1 (89.8)	32.1 (89.8)	31.4 (88.5)	31.4 (88.5)	32.0 (89.6)	32.1 (89.8)	32.2 (90.0)
Daily mean °C (°F)	26.2 (79.2)	26.6 (79.9)	27.5 (81.5)	28.2 (82.8)	28.3 (82.9)	27.9 (82.2)	27.8 (82.0)	27.6 (81.7)	27.2 (81.0)	26.8 (80.2)	27.1 (80.8)	26.6 (79.9)	27.3 (81.2)
Mean daily minimum °C (°F)	20.3 (68.5)	20.7 (69.3)	22.0 (71.6)	23.3 (73.9)	24.0 (75.2)	23.9 (75.0)	23.5 (74.3)	23.1 (73.6)	23.1 (73.6)	22.3 (72.1)	22.2 (72.0)	21.1 (70.0)	22.5 (72.4)
Average rainfall mm (inches)	0 (0)	0 (0)	6 (0.2)	38 (1.5)	136 (5.4)	288 (11.3)	241 (9.5)	213 (8.4)	320 (12.6)	244 (9.6)	31 (1.2)	3 (0.1)	1,520 (59.8)
Source: Climate-Data.org

== Demographics ==
The municipality had an estimated population of 20,697 inhabitants in 2023. The population consisted of 10,585 males and 10,112 females. About 27.8% of the population was below the age of fourteen, and 4.7% was over the age of 65 years. Majority of the population (73.3%) was classified as rural, while 26.7% lived in urban areas. About 77.7% of the inhabitants were born in the same municipality. Ladinos (98%) formed the major ethnic group, with Maya (1.3%) forming a small minority. The municipality had a literacy rate of 86.4%, and Spanish (98.5%) was the most spoken language.

== Gallery ==
Pictures from La Ilustración Guatemalteca

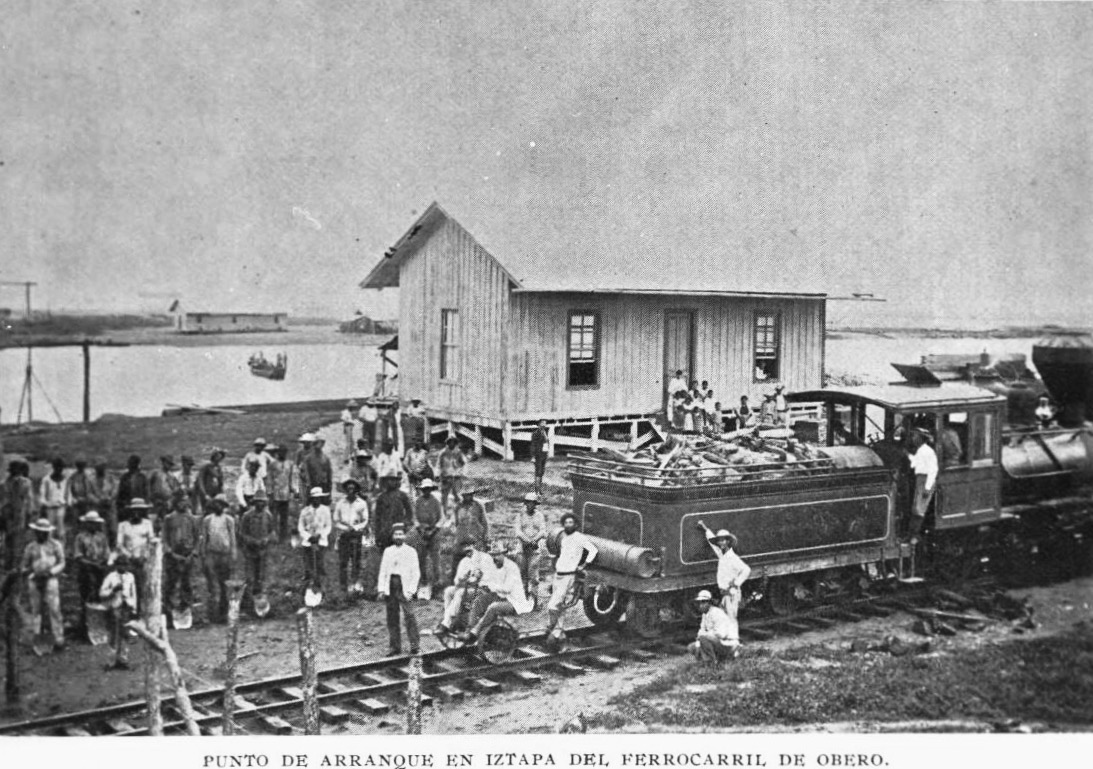
Beginning of the Obero railroad.

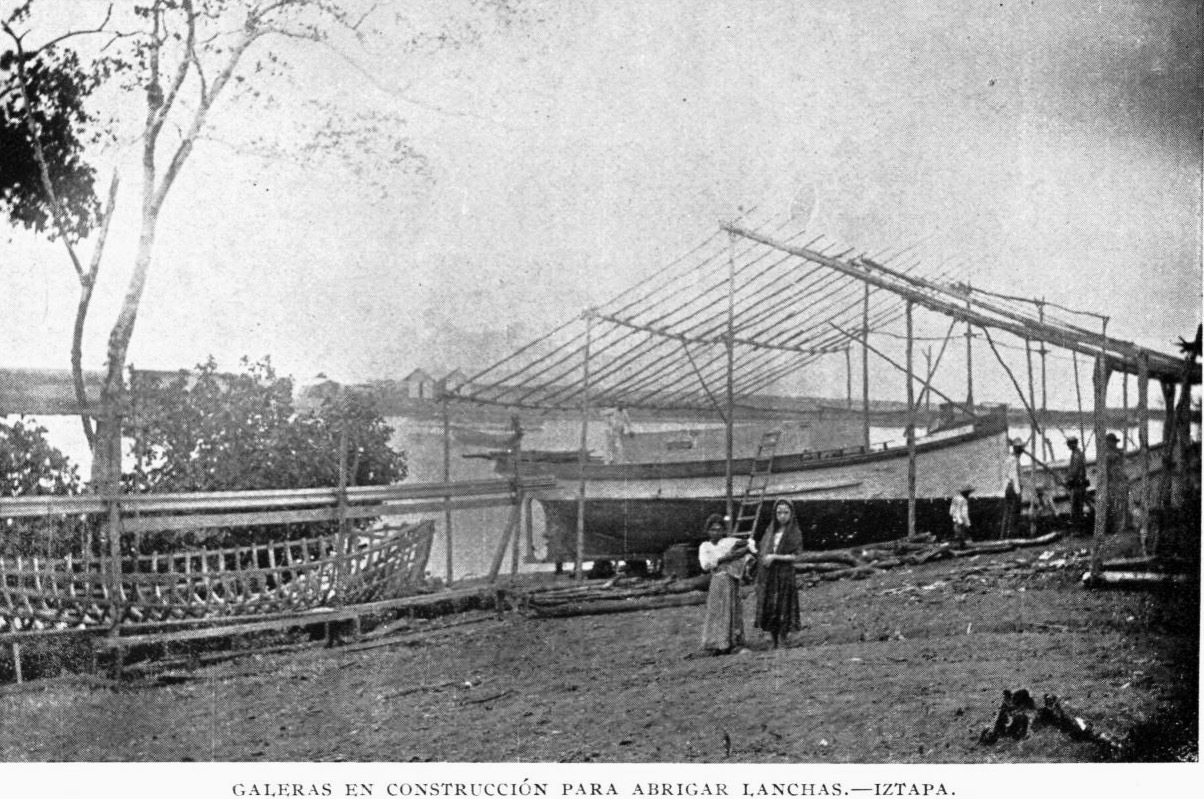
Steamworks in Iztapa.

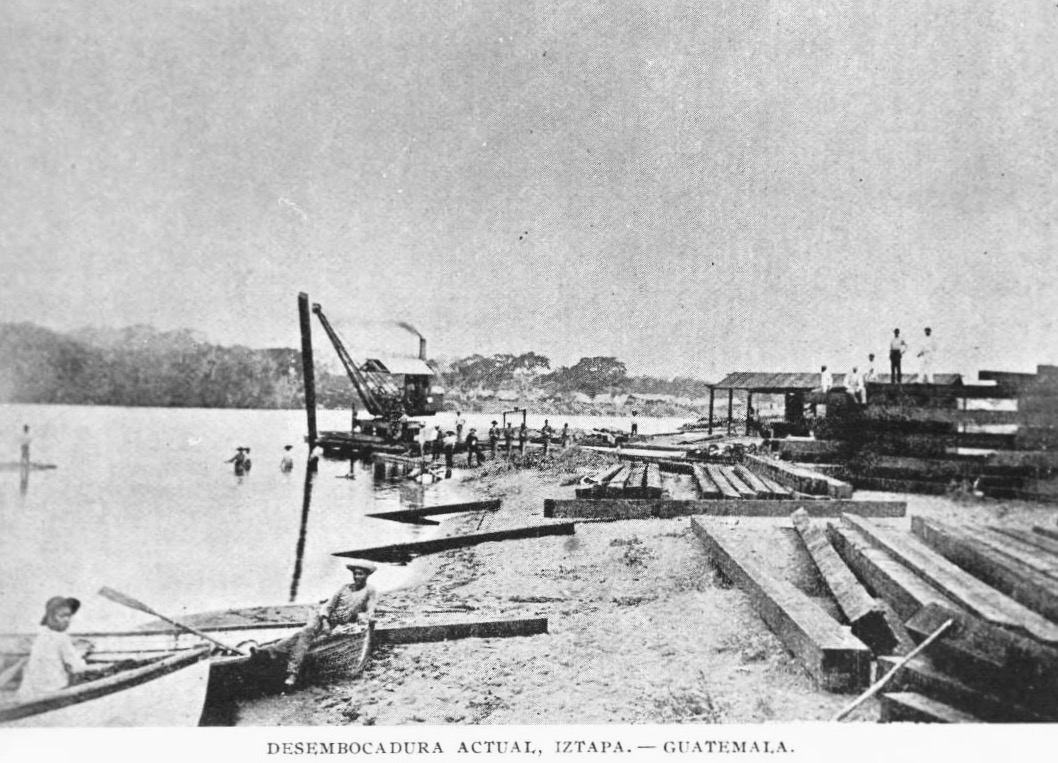
Michatoya river

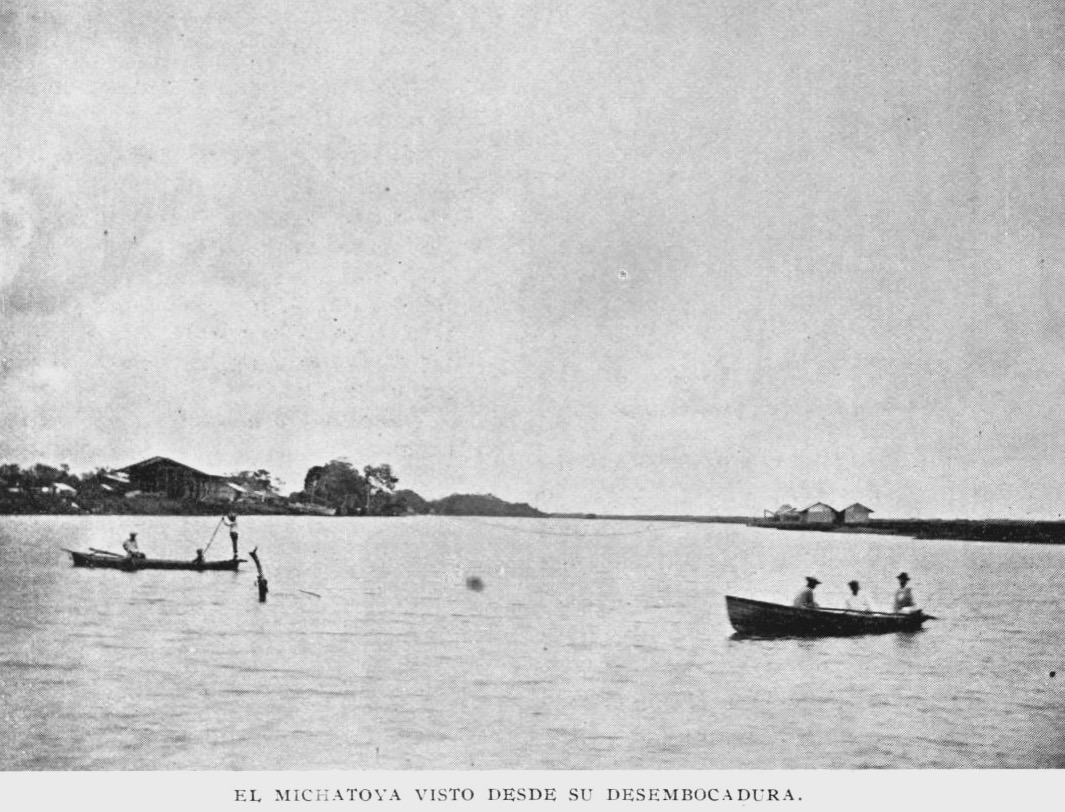
Michatoya river
