= Monte Alto culture =

Monte Alto in the context of other nearby Preclassic sites

Monte Alto is an archaeological site on the Pacific Coast in what is now Guatemala.

== History ==
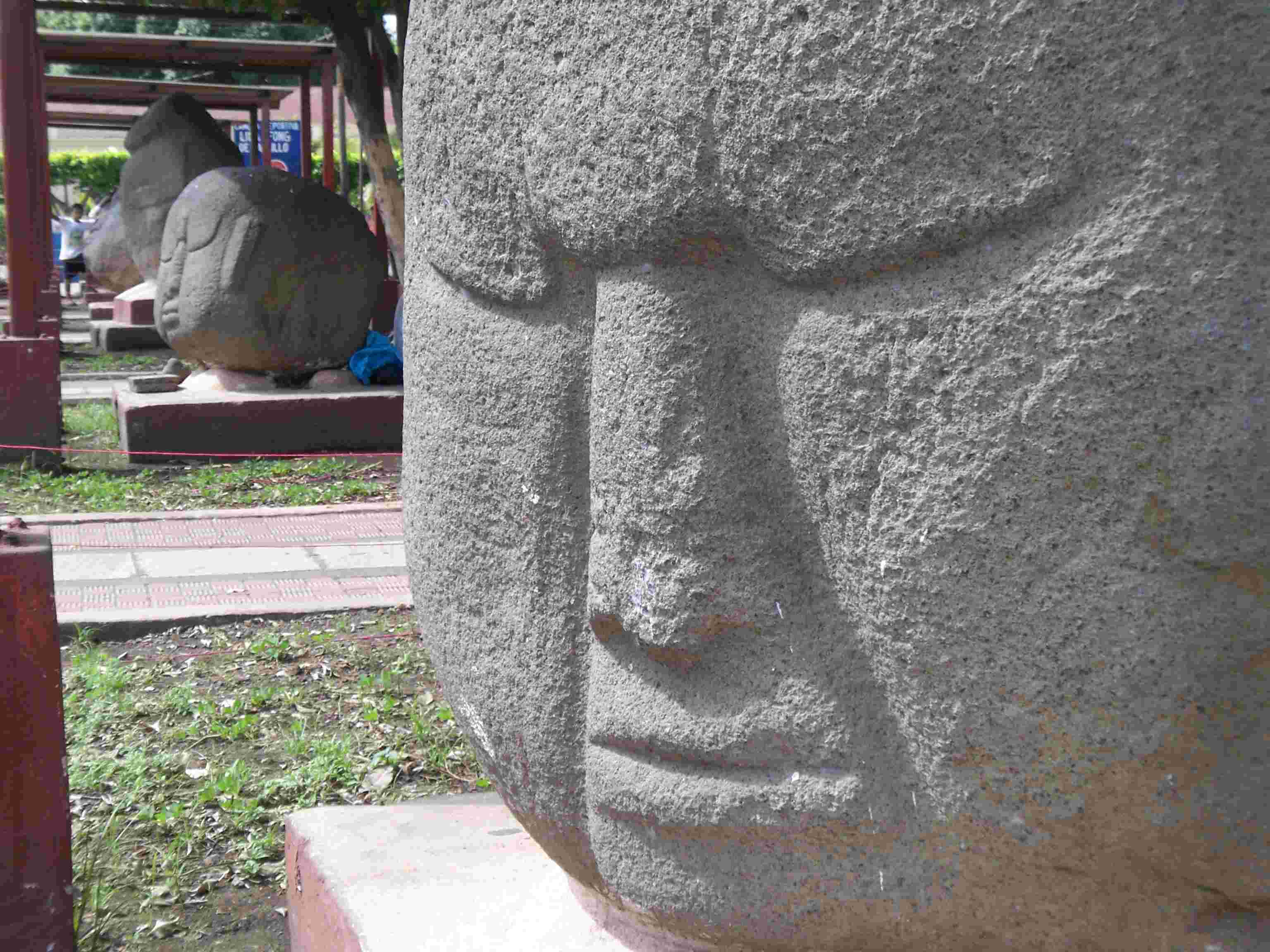
Monte Alto giant stone heads

Located 20 km southeast from Santa Lucía Cotzumalguapa in Escuintla, Monte Alto was occupied as early as 1800 BC, but has a fairly light presence – less than either El Bálsamo or Los Cerritos Sur located about 10 km west and east of Monte Alto respectively. During the Late Preclassic (400 BC to AD 200), Monte Alto became a regional center.

The site has 45 major structures, the tallest being a 20 m high pyramid. The Monte Alto Culture is one of the oldest in Mesoamerica and perhaps predates the Olmec.

There is also a substantial Early Classic occupation but it is largely localized at Structure 6, a large platform located well to the northeast.

== Art ==
Although Monte Alto is noted for its sculptures (heads and potbellies), more than a dozen tabular shaped stone stelae were found as well as three stone altars.

Two general styles of sculpture are found at the Monte Alto site, one representing a human head, and the other, a human body. Since both the heads and the bodies are rather crudely shaped from large, rounded basaltic boulders, the subjects have a decidedly corpulent appearance. Because they seem to be male figures, they have been termed "potbellies" in the archaeological literature.

== Alignments ==
Fifteen plain stelas were recorded at Monte Alto and one alignment of three large plain stelae erected in a north–south line could have served astronomical purposes as a means for recording days and the position of the sun for agricultural purposes. In fact, the azimuth from the principal pyramid to the south stela marked the winter solstice on December 21. The sun rose over the central stela on February 19: February 19 at midnight marked the eastern elongation of the Eta Draconis star in the Pleiades during the Late Preclassic period.

According to Marion Popenoe de Hatch, Eta Draconis shows unusual stability, and, that from 1800 B.C. to A.D. 500, the annual date of its meridian midnight transit varied less than one day. She has shown that alignments of certain monuments at Takalik Abaj, also mark the eastern elongation of Eta Draconis at various periods during Tak'alik Abaj existence.

== Magnetism ==
Many of the Monte Alto sculptures are magnetic as well. Since certain distinctive patterns of magnetism recur with some frequency, it would appear that the sculptures were executed by artisans who were aware of these properties. If this is true, the Monte Alto sculptures would be the oldest known magnetic artifacts in the world.

Of the collection of "potbellies" sculptures from Monte Alto on display in the town park of La Democracia, Guatemala and in front of its local museum, Museo Regional de Arqueología de la Democracia, four of the heads and three of the bodies were found to have magnetic properties. All four of the heads have a north magnetic pole located in their right temples, while three of them have south magnetic poles below the right ear and the fourth (that in front of the museum) has a south magnetic pole in its left temple. Such a pattern of occurrence is unlikely to be a matter of chance, even in a sample size as small as four.

== Contemporary sites ==
During the Maya Preclassic period, the sites in the area that are contemporary to Monte Alto are Chiapa de Corzo (Mesoamerican site), Izapa, Abaj Takalik, and El Baul, along with such highland communities as Kaminaljuyu and Chalchuapa.

== See also ==
- Museo Regional de Arqueología de la Democracia, Escuintla
