= Acatenango, Chimaltenango =

Acatenango
- Municipality and town
- Location within Chimaltenango Department Location within Guatemala
- Coordinates: 14°33′16″N 90°56′38″W
- Country: Guatemala
- Department: Chimaltenango

Government
  - Mayor (2016-2020): Isaías Marroquín F.

Area
  - Municipality and town: 55 sq mi (143 km^{2})

Population (2018 census)
  - Municipality and town: 23,228
  - Density: 421/sq mi (162/km^{2})
  - Urban: 12,136
- Time zone: UTC+6 (Central Time)
- Climate: Cwb

Acatenango is a town and municipality in the Chimaltenango department of Guatemala. It is in this municipality that the Acatenango volcano is located. The town is in the valley of the Cocoyá River.

== History ==
=== Spanish colony ===
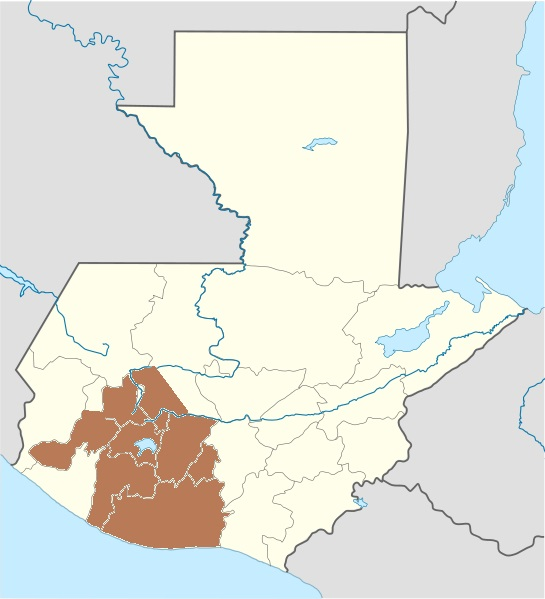
Some of the 24 convents of the Franciscan Provincia del Santísimo Nombre de Jesús during the Spanish colony in Guatemala and the approximate area it doctrines occupied.

The Catholic faith of the town was in charge of the Franciscans, who had convents and doctrines in the area covered by the modern departaments of Sacatepéquez, Chimaltenango, Sololá, Quetzaltenango, Totonicapán, Suchitepéquez and Escuintla. The "Provincia del Santísimo Nombre de Jesús" (English:"Province of the most Holy Name of Jesus"), as the Franciscan area was then called, reached up to 24 convents. By 1700, Panajachel had a convent with three priests, in charge of ca. 1800 people, four doctrines and twelve cofradías.

Given that Acatenango had a convent, there was daily Mass attended by cofradías leaders and their wives, who kept lighted candles during most of the ceremony. Also daily, the Franciscans tried to have daily religious teaching for 6 year old girls and older starting at 2:00 pm and for boys of the same age starting at sunset; the class lasted for 2 hours and consisted on memorizing the church teaching and prayers and to make some exercises with the catechism and it was run by a priest or by elder natives, called "fiscales". Adults attended Mass every Sunday and holiday and after mass, there were religious teachings in their own language.

Lent was a time of the year when the friars prepared the natives thoroughly, using their own language to accomplish their goals; every Friday of Lent there was a procession following the Rosary steps all the way to the Calvary temple.

In 1754, as part of the Bourbon Reforms, the Franciscans were forced to give their doctrines to the secular clergy.

=== After independence from Spain ===
When the State of Guatemala was created on 11 October 1825, after independence from Spain, Acatenango was established as town, and then was raised to a municipality of the Chimaltenango District by a decree from 12 September 1839.

=== 1974 Volcán de Fuego eruption ===
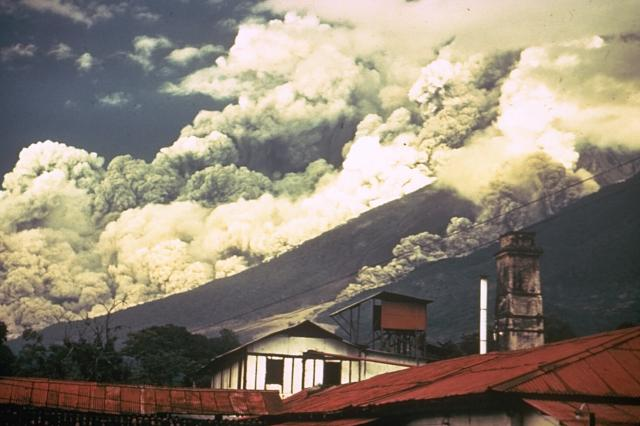
The 1974 Volcán de Fuego eruption partially destroyed San Pedro Yepocapa.

Towns impacted by the 1974 eruption.

On 15 October 1974, tremors woke up people in the settlements surrounding the Volcán de Fuego at 2:00 AM, followed by rumbling and cinders and ashes falling from the sky, which submerged the town into darkness for a few days. President Kjell Eugenio Laugerud García gave order to evacuate people, most of whom were sorry about losing all of their belongings after the eruption; in the meantime, ash was travelling as far away s the Mexican states of Chiapas and Oaxaca, to the point that Mexican authorities were on alert due to the amounts of it that they were getting.

San Pedro Yepocapa was one of the most impacted towns, ending under more than 1m of ash after the four days that the eruption lasted; approximately 1100 people from Morelia hacienda and annexes had to be evacuated to temporary shelters in neighboring Santa Lucía Cotzumalguapa, Escuintla or Patulul, Suchitepéquez.

Democracia Cristiana Guatemalteca —DCG— directors - then the main opposition party in the country after losing the presidency to Laugerud Garcia in fraudulent elections earlier that year, asked to all the mayors to help their colleagues from San Pedro Yepocapa and Acatenango, which were practically destroyed by the catastrophe; those two mayor belonged to DCG. Help began to arrive on 24 October 1974, when the eruption ceased and equipment from the Road General Direction of Guatemala arrived to the towns to clean them up, and operation that lasted three months.

== Acatenango volcano ==
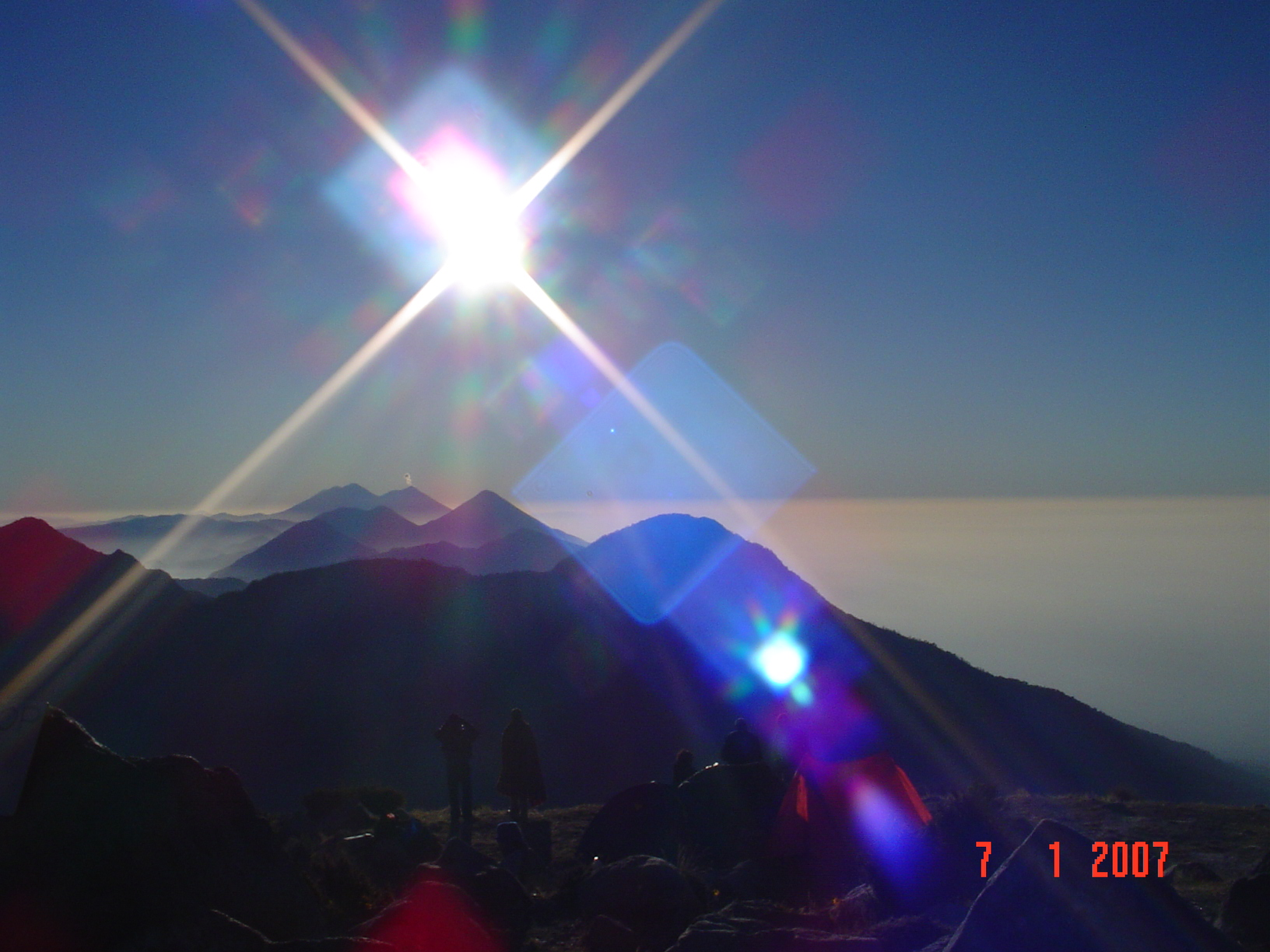
Acatenango volcano.

This massive volcano complex towers more than 3,500 metres above the Pacific coastal plain to the south and 2,000 metres above the Guatemalan Highlands to the north. The volcano complex comprises remnants of multiple eruptive centers, which periodically have collapsed to form huge debris avalanches. The largest of these avalanches extended more than 50 kilometres from its source and covered more than 300 square kilometres. Contrary to its neighbor, Volcán de Fuego, it has been dormant for the last hundred years.

== Administrative division ==
=== Urban setting ===
The urban section of the municipality has three zones:

1. Zone 1: San Carlos, El Potrerito and Naranjales neighborhoods
2. Zone 2: Urban regions of Calle Real, La Ladrillera, El Calvario and Los Olivos.
3. Zone 3: El Sare and El Campo neighborhoods; urban regions of El Caracol, El Cementerio, El Parque and Las Lajas.
4. El Tanque urban region is between zones 2 and 3.

=== Municipality division ===
Settlement type	Names
Villages	El Destierro (La Soledad), San Antonio Nejapa, Los Planes, El Socorro, Los Pajales I, Los Pajales II, Quisajche, Nueva Concepción, El Campamento, La Pampa, Pacoc, Pacacay, Pueblo Nuevo and Santa Isabel.
Settlements	Xacaya, Ana Chimichabal, El Tesoro, El Mirador and Tzinquinya.
Rural regions	Los Cerritos and Agua Caliente.

== Climate ==
Acatenango has a subtropical highland climate (Köppen: Cwb).

Climate data for Acatenango
Month	Jan	Feb	Mar	Apr	May	Jun	Jul	Aug	Sep	Oct	Nov	Dec	Year
Mean daily maximum °C (°F)	23.9 (75.0)	24.5 (76.1)	25.5 (77.9)	25.5 (77.9)	25.2 (77.4)	23.9 (75.0)	24.3 (75.7)	24.3 (75.7)	23.5 (74.3)	23.3 (73.9)	23.9 (75.0)	23.5 (74.3)	24.3 (75.7)
Daily mean °C (°F)	17.6 (63.7)	18.0 (64.4)	18.9 (66.0)	19.6 (67.3)	19.8 (67.6)	19.6 (67.3)	19.5 (67.1)	19.2 (66.6)	18.8 (65.8)	18.4 (65.1)	18.4 (65.1)	17.4 (63.3)	18.8 (65.8)
Mean daily minimum °C (°F)	11.4 (52.5)	11.6 (52.9)	12.4 (54.3)	13.7 (56.7)	14.4 (57.9)	15.3 (59.5)	14.7 (58.5)	14.2 (57.6)	14.2 (57.6)	13.6 (56.5)	12.9 (55.2)	11.4 (52.5)	13.3 (56.0)
Average precipitation mm (inches)	4 (0.2)	12 (0.5)	13 (0.5)	45 (1.8)	146 (5.7)	370 (14.6)	233 (9.2)	235 (9.3)	383 (15.1)	208 (8.2)	41 (1.6)	9 (0.4)	1,699 (67.1)
Source: Climate-Data.org

== See also ==
- List of places in Guatemala

== Sources ==
- García Añoveros, Jesús (1989). "Las misiones franciscanas de la Mosquitia nicaragüense" (PDF). Actas del III Congreso Internacional Sobre los Franciscanos en el Nuevo Mundo (Siglo XVII) (in Spanish). Madrid, Spain: DEIMOS; Universidad Internacional de Andalucía.
- Juarros, Domingo (1818). Compendio de la historia de la Ciudad de Guatemala (in Spanish). Guatemala: Ignacio Beteta.
