= Escuintla =

- Municipality
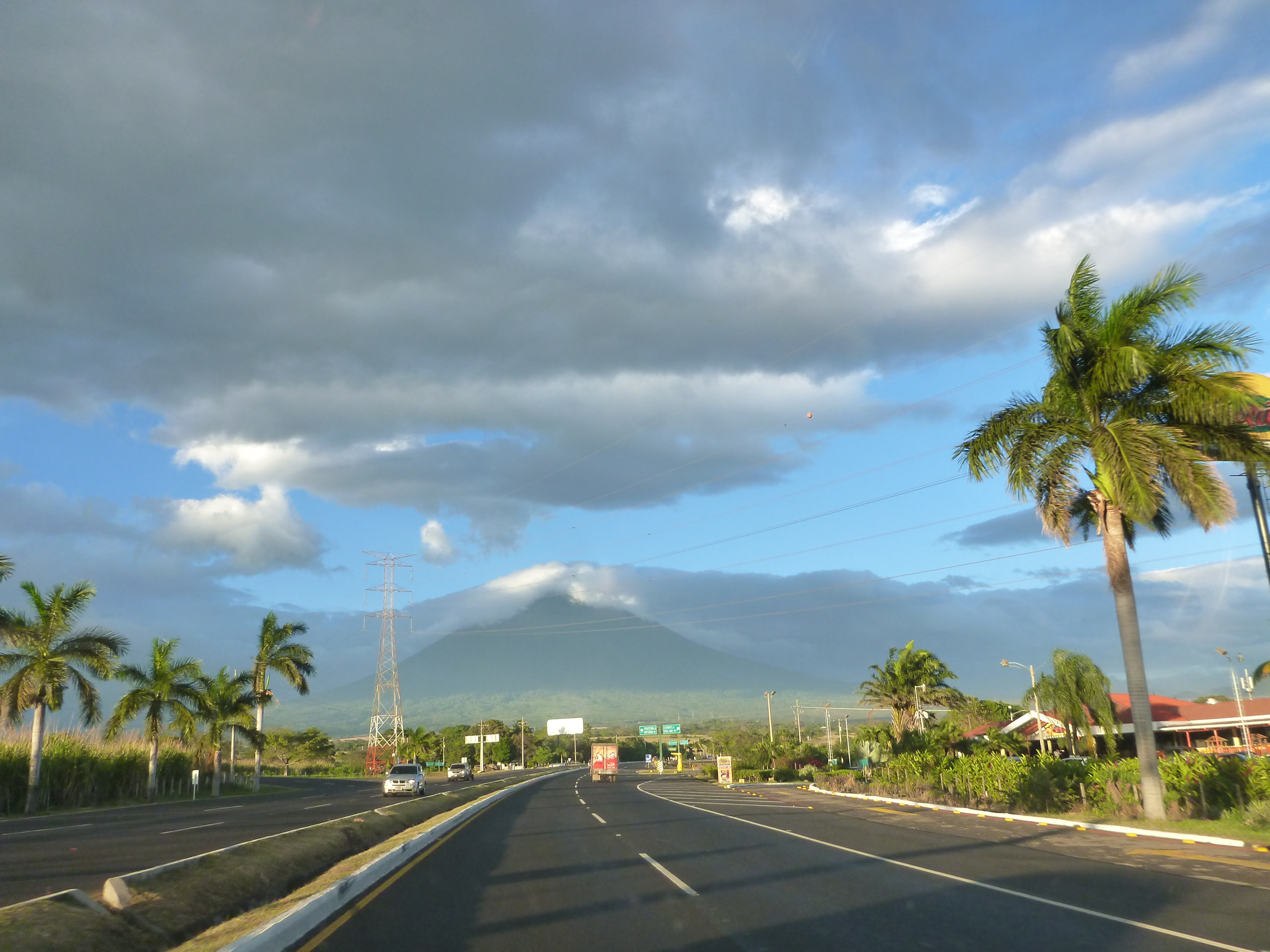
- Escuintla, Guatemala

- Flag Seal

- Location in Guatemala
- Coordinates: 14°17′52″N 90°47′13″W
- Country: Guatemala
- Department: Escuintla
- Municipality: Escuintla

Government
  - Type: Municipal
  - Mayor: Abraham Rivera

Area
  - Municipality: 545 km^{2} (210 sq mi)
- Elevation: 355 m (1,165 ft)

Population (census 2018)
  - Municipality: 156,313
  - Density: 287/km^{2} (743/sq mi)
  - Urban: 156,313
  - Religions: Roman Catholicism Evangelicalism
- Climate: Am

Escuintla (Spanish pronunciation: [esˈkwintla]) is an industrial city in Guatemala, its land area is 4,384 km^{2}, and it is nationally known for its sugar agribusiness. Its capital is a municipality with the same name. Citizens celebrate from December 6 to 9 with a small fair in honor of the Catholic religious holiday of The Immaculate Conception.

In 2002 the city had a population of 86,678. It is located on the border of the central highlands and the Pacific coastal plain.

== Etymology ==
Many of the names of the Departments of Guatemala consist of one of two things: the name of a catholic saint associated with the day the city was founded by Spanish Catholics or a description with Náhuatl roots. These influences are due to the ethnicities of the troops under command of Pedro de Alvarado who invaded the region in 1520. The troops were composed of Spanish soldiers and indigenous Tlaxcaltec men.

The name Escuintla, comes from Nahuatl «Itzcuintlān», which composed of two words:

· «Itzcuintli»: means "dog"

· «-tlān»: is a suffix meaning "near" or "place of"

Therefore, Escuintla means "place of dogs" or "near the dogs".

== History ==
By the late postclassic period, Escuintla (Itzcuintlan) was a notable town inhabited by Pipil people.

Escuintla used to be an important stop for trains going to Puerto San José until 2007.

== Economy ==
The city is among the more industrialized areas of the country. One of the most important agricultural products of the region is sugar cane. Other products are tobacco, seafood, and cattle. Escuintla is bathed by the waters of the Pacific, and produces about 43 percent of gross domestic product of Guatemala, is statistically the department, province or region in Mesoamerica with lower unemployment and extreme poverty, this contrasts with the economic and social reality of Guatemala.

== Geography ==
The city of Escuintla consists of 2 villages and 12 surrounding communities. The area includes 7 mountains, 55 rivers, 9 streams, and 21 brooks.

=== Geographic location ===
To the north of the municipality of Escuintla is Yepocapa (municipality of Chimaltenango) and Alotenango (municipality of Sacatepequez). To the East is Palin, San Vicente Pacaya, and Guanagazapa (municipality of Escuintla). To the south is Masagua (municipality of Escuintla) and the surfing village of El Paredón. To the west is La Democracia, Siquinalá, and Santa Lucía Cotzumalguapa (municipality of Escuintla).

== Transportation ==
Today, the CA-2 and CA-9 highways cross here.

== Municipal Government ==
The government of the cities of Guatemala are made of a municipal council. This is in accordance with article 254 in the Political Constitution of the Republic of Guatemala. The municipal code, which is similar to the ordinary law and contains disposition that applies to all cities of Guatemala, establishes in article 9 that the municipal council covers the deliberations and decisions of municipal issues.

The municipal council integrates with accordance of what the Constitution declares in article 254 which says that the council consists of a mayor, trustees, and councilors that have been elected and may be reelected by the public for a period of four years. With respect to the municipal code, article 9 of the constitution explains that this system is done in all municipalities in accordance to the stated law.

The mayors of Escuintla:

- 2016-2020: Abrahám Rivera Estévez

== Sports ==
Juventud Escuintleca football club play their home games at the Estadio Ricardo Muñoz Gálvez. Most recently they have again been playing in the second tier of Guatemalan football.

== Climate ==
Escuintla has a tropical monsoon climate (Köppen: Am).

Climate data for Escuintla
Month	Jan	Feb	Mar	Apr	May	Jun	Jul	Aug	Sep	Oct	Nov	Dec	Year
Mean daily maximum °C (°F)	31.9 (89.4)	32.1 (89.8)	33.4 (92.1)	33.3 (91.9)	32.5 (90.5)	31.2 (88.2)	31.5 (88.7)	31.2 (88.2)	30.2 (86.4)	30.1 (86.2)	30.4 (86.7)	31.0 (87.8)	31.6 (88.8)
Daily mean °C (°F)	25.5 (77.9)	25.7 (78.3)	27.2 (81.0)	27.3 (81.1)	27.3 (81.1)	26.5 (79.7)	26.9 (80.4)	26.7 (80.1)	25.7 (78.3)	25.2 (77.4)	25.1 (77.2)	25.1 (77.2)	26.2 (79.1)
Mean daily minimum °C (°F)	19.2 (66.6)	19.4 (66.9)	21.0 (69.8)	21.3 (70.3)	22.2 (72.0)	21.8 (71.2)	22.3 (72.1)	22.2 (72.0)	21.3 (70.3)	20.4 (68.7)	19.8 (67.6)	19.3 (66.7)	20.9 (69.5)
Average precipitation mm (inches)	7 (0.3)	13 (0.5)	30 (1.2)	93 (3.7)	333 (13.1)	555 (21.9)	337 (13.3)	360 (14.2)	581 (22.9)	417 (16.4)	85 (3.3)	15 (0.6)	2,826 (111.4)
Source: Climate-Data.org

== Notable people ==
- Norma Torres (born 1965) – U.S. representative for California

== See also ==
- Escuintla Department
