= Museo Regional de Arqueología de la Democracia, Escuintla =

Archaeological museum in La Democracia, Guatemala

Regional Archaeological Museum of La Democracia
- Museo Regional de Arqueología de la Democracia
- Established: February 1966
- Location: La Democracia, Escuintla, Guatemala
- Coordinates: 14°13′47.15″N 90°56′51.76″W

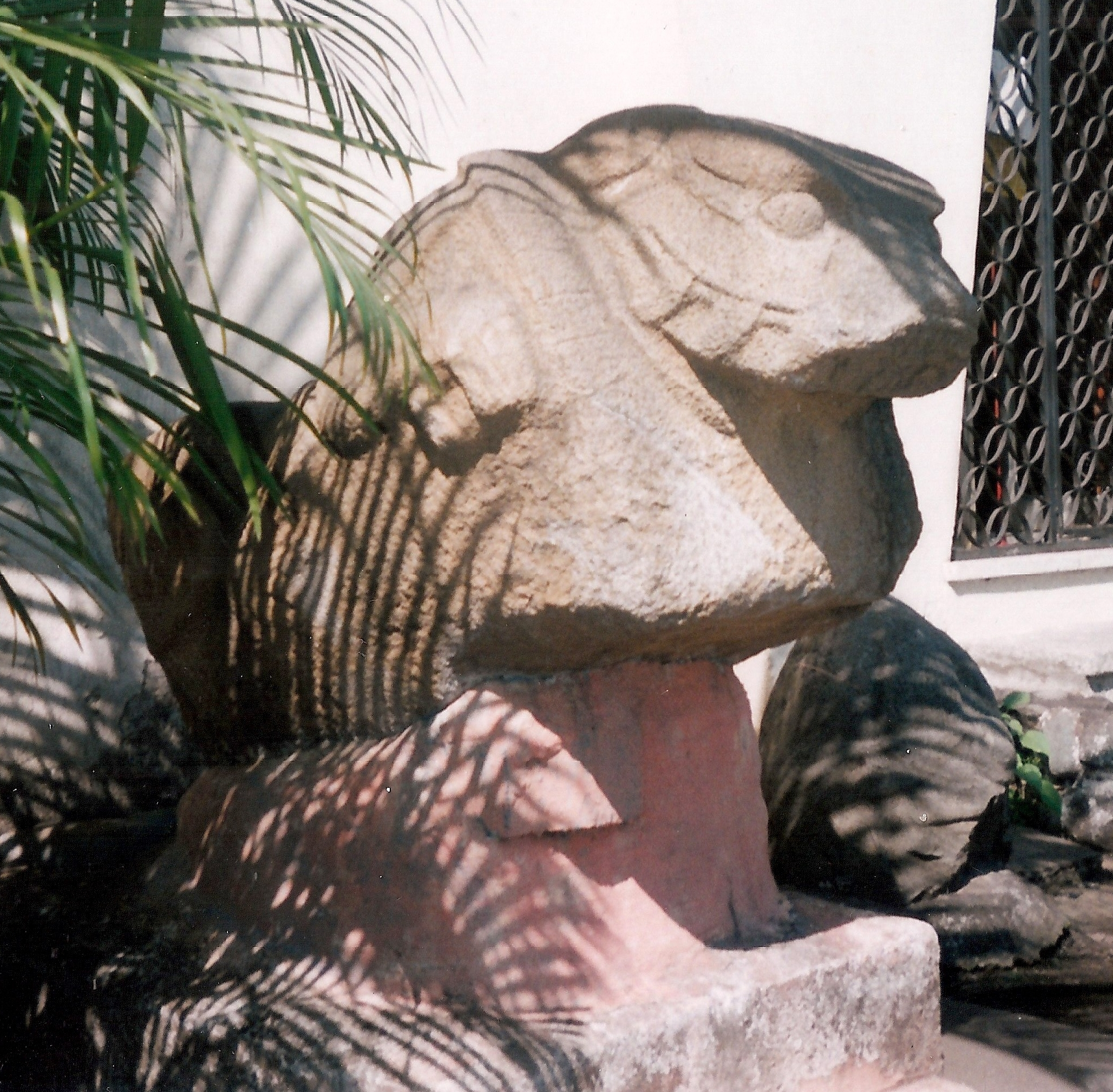
Prehispanic sculpture on display at the entrance to the museum

The Museo Regional de Arqueología de la Democracia ("Regional Archaeological Museum of La Democracia") is an archaeological museum in the municipality of La Democracia in the department of Escuintla in Guatemala. The museum displays pre-Columbian Mesoamerican artefacts from the Pacific lowlands datingfrom the Preclassic Period through to the Postclassic Period, with a particular emphasis upon the local Monte Alto culture. The museum is open from Tuesday through to Saturday from 8 am to 4 pm.

== Location ==
The museum is situated opposite the central park of La Democracia, which is notable for its display of large prehispanic sculptures in the potbelly style. La Democracia is situated in the department of Escuintla at an altitude of 165 metres (541 ft) above mean sea level. It is 92 kilometres (57 mi) from Guatemala City. The local climate is hot, with an average temperature of 35 °C (95 °F).

== History ==
The museum was founded in February 1966 at the instigation of Rubén Chévez van Dorne, who had regularly been given pre-Columbian ceramic pieces by teachers working on a cotton plantation in the neighbouring municipality of La Gomera, who observed that archaeological remains were frequently uncovered by tractors. The museum was placed in a school building that was refurbished by INGUAT, the Guatemalan Institute of Tourism; it had previously housed the Escuelas Urbanas de la Democracia. The museum opened its doors on 22 May 1972. As part of the refurbishment, Guatemalan artist Guillermo Grajeda Meno painted 21 murals within the museum.

== Collection ==
Aside from its archaeological collection, the museum possesses an exhibition of modern art by Guatemalan artists, displayed on the upper floor. The museum also holds a collection of historical books and documents. The anthropomorphic sculpture of a head outside the museum entrance was loaned for two months for display at the Metropolitan Museum of Art in New York.

== Sources ==
- Chévez van Dorne, Rubén (1999) [First published 1978], "Cultura Monte Alto", Mundo Impresos, Guatemala City, OCLC 63315619
- INFORPRESSCA. "La Democracia, Escuintla" (in Spanish). Guatemala City: Servicio de Información Municipal.
- Ministerio de Cultura y Deportes (c. 1997). La Democracia: Panorama cultural: Museo de Arqueología - Museo de Arte (in Spanish). Guatemala: Editorial Cultura.
- REDCAMUS. "Museo Regional de Arqueología de la Democracia" (in Spanish). Red Centroamericana de Museos (REDCAMUS).
