= CSD Puerto San José =

Association football club in Guatemala

Puerto San José
- Full name: Club Social y Deportivo Puerto San José
- Nickname(s): Los Tiburones (The Sharks)
- Ground: Estadio Vicente Arévalo
- Capacity: 1,000
- Manager: Julio Roca
- League: Primera División de Ascenso
- Website: https://m.facebook.com/CSDPSJ/?__tn__=%2Cg
Home colours	Away colours

Club Social y Deportivo Puerto San José is a Guatemalan football club from Puerto San José, Escuintla Department. It has played several seasons at the Liga Nacional de Fútbol de Guatemala being a great representative of the Escuintla Department. It currently plays on the Primera División de Ascenso, second tier on Guatemalan football.

== Current squad ==
Note: Flags indicate national team as defined under FIFA eligibility rules; some limited exceptions apply. Players may hold more than one non-FIFA nationality.

No.	Pos.	Nation	Player
—	GK	GUA	Abner Úbeda
—	GK	GUA	Edgar Carrillo
—	GK	GUA	Miguel Ángel García
—	DF	GUA	Manolo Ramos
—	DF	GUA	Sergio Castañeda
—	DF	GUA	Edwar Peñate
—	DF	GUA	Moisés Callejas
—	DF	GUA	Kevin Castillo
—	DF	GUA	Brian Gonzales
—	MF	GUA	José Chan
—	MF	GUA	Irvin Bonilla
—	MF	COL	Jhon Fredy Hurtado

No.	Pos.	Nation	Player
—	MF	GUA	Nicolás Alaya
—	MF	GUA	Juan Carlos Castillo
—	MF	GUA	Edwin Echeverría
—	FW	GUA	Miguel Ojeda
—	FW	GUA	José Carrillo
—	FW	GUA	Diego Callata
—	FW	GUA	Edson Balcárcel
—	FW	GUA	Eduardo Centeno
—	FW	GUA	Carlos Umaña
—	FW	GUA	Yeison García
—	FW	GUA	Óscar Martínez
—	FW	ARG	Juan Lovato
