= Siquinalá =

- Municipality and town

- Location in Guatemala
- Country: Guatemala
- Department: Escuintla

Area
  - Total: 39.9 sq mi (103.4 km^{2})

Population (2023)
  - Total: 26,645
  - Density: 667.4/sq mi (257.7/km^{2})
- Climate: Am

Siquinalá is a city and a municipality in the Escuintla department of Guatemala. It covers an area of approximately 103.4 km^{2} (39.9 sq mi). As per 2023 estimates, it has a population of about 26,645 inhabitants.

== History ==
The origin of Siquinalá dates to the pre-Columbian period, where it was located between the settlements of Cotzumalguapa and Itzcuintlan, and was probably occupied by the Kaqchikel people. The population was later forced to migrate due to volcanic eruptions.

On 11 October 1825, when the Constitution of Guatemala was adopted, Siquinalá was part of the District No. 2 in the circuit of Escuintla. On 6 March 1867, it was elevated as a municipality. While the municipality might have been abolished later, it was restored by a government order on 4 August 1910.

== Geography ==
Siquinala is a municipality in the Escuintla Department in Guatemala. It is spread over an area of 103.4 km^{2} (39.9 sq mi). It lies in the north western part of the department, about 82 km (51 mi) from the departmental capital of Escuintla and 170 km (110 mi) from the national capital of Guatemala city. It borders the municipalities of Santa Lucía Cotzumalguapa to the north and west, Escuintla to the east, and La Democracia south.

Located at an elevation of 336.58 m (1,104.3 ft) above sea level, La Gomera has a tropical monsoon climate (Köppen climate classification: Am). The municipality has an average annual temperature of 26.44 °C (79.59 °F), and receives about 125.13 mm (4.926 in) of rainfall annually.

The town holds an annual festival on November 25, in honor of Saint Catherine of Alexandria (Santa Catalina de Alejandria).

== Demographics ==
The municipality had an estimated population of 26,645 inhabitants in 2023. The population consisted of 13,685 males and 12,960 females. About 30.1% of the population was below the age of fourteen, and 5.1% was over the age of 65 years. Majority of the population (79%) was classified as urban, while 21% lived in rural areas. About 53.6% of the inhabitants were born in the same municipality. Ladinos (92.9%) formed the major ethnic group, with Maya (5.9%) forming a small minority. The municipality had a literacy rate of 86.4%, and Spanish (94.4%) was the most spoken language.
