= Yepocapa =

San Pedro Yepocapa Apocapa Yepocapa
- Municipality and town of Guatemala

- Flag

- Location within Guatemala Location within Chimaltenango Department
- Coordinates: 14°30′N 90°57′W
- Country: Guatemala
- Department: Chimaltenango
- Established: 1839

Government
  - Type: Municipal
  - Mayor (2016-2020): Bernabé Ajín Vicente

Area
  - Total: 83 sq mi (214 km^{2})
- Elevation: 4,600 ft (1,400 m)

Population (2018 census)
  - Total: 34,948
  - Density: 423/sq mi (163/km^{2})
- Time zone: UTC+6 (Central Time)
- Climate: Am

Yepocapa, also known as San Pedro Yepocapa, is a town with a population of 17,021 (2018 census), and a municipality in the Chimaltenango department of Guatemala. It is located at the base of Volcán de Fuego, which has destroyed the town several times, most recently on 15 October 1974.

== History ==
San Pedro Yepocapa has its origins in the times before the Spanish conquest of Guatemala; originally the town was right next to Volcán de Fuego, but it had to be moved to a different location because of the numerous eruptions of it. Spanish soldier Antonio de Guzmán is credited with being the one that found the town when the conquistadors arrived in the 1520s.

=== Spanish colony: Franciscan doctrine ===
After the Spanish conquest of Guatemala the town was in charge of the franciscans, who had convents and doctrines in the area covered by the modern departments of Sacatepéquez, Chimaltenango, Sololá, Quetzaltenango, Totonicapán, Suchitepéquez and Escuintla. The "Provincia del Santísimo Nombre de Jesús" (English:"Province of the most Holy Name of Jesus"), as the Franciscan area was then called, reached up to 24 convents by 1700.

The Franciscans tried to have daily religious teaching for 6-year-old girls and older starting at 2:00 pm and for boys of the same age starting at sunset; the class lasted for 2 hours and consisted on memorizing the church teaching and prayers and to make some exercises with the catechism and it was run by a priest or by elder natives, called "fiscales". Adults attended Mass every Sunday and holiday and after mass, there were religious teachings in their own language.

Lent was a time of the year when the friars prepared the natives thoroughly, using their own language to accomplish their goals; every Friday of Lent there was a procession following the Rosary steps all the way to the Calvary temple.

A document from Franciscan friar Francisco de Zuaza written on 8 July 1686, found in the Archdiocese of Guatemala archives and made public in 1944, describes Franciscan convents and doctrines in Guatemala and regarding the Acatenango convent says: "There is another visit town, named San Pedro Yepocapa, which is 16 km from the convent, on the way to the sea shore, on badly maintained road. The temperature of this town is warm because it is close to the coast".

In 1754, as part of the borbon reforms, the Franciscans where forced to giae their doctrines to the secular clergy.

=== After independence from Spain ===
When the State of Guatemala was created on 11 October 1825, after independence from Spain, San Pedro Yepocapa was established as town, and then was raised to a municipality of the Chimaltenango District by a decree from 12 September 1839. By 1880 already had a population a little over a thousand focused mainly on agricultural activities.

=== 1974 Volcán de Fuego eruption ===
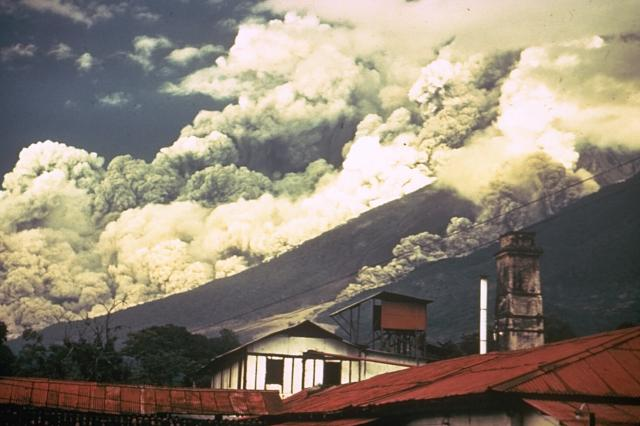
The 1974 Volcán de Fuego eruption partially destroyed San Pedro Yepocapa.

Towns impacted by the 1974 eruption.

On 15 October 1974, tremors woke up people in the settlements surrounding the Volcán de Fuego at 2:00 AM, followed by rumbling and cinders and ashes falling from the sky, which submerged the town into darkness for a few days. President Kjell Eugenio Laugerud García gave order to evacuate people, most of whom were sorry about losing all of their belongings after the eruption; in the meantime, ash was travelling as far away s the Mexican states of Chiapas and Oaxaca, to the point that Mexican authorities were on alert due to the amounts of it that they were getting.

San Pedro Yepocapa was one of the most impacted towns, ending under more than 1m of ash after the four days that the eruption lasted; approximately 1100 people from Morelia hacienda and annexes had to be evacuated to temporary shelters in neighboring Santa Lucía Cotzumalguapa, Escuintla or Patulul, Suchitepéquez.

Democracia Cristiana Guatemalteca —DCG— directors -then the main opposition party in the country after losing the presidency to Laugerud Garcia in fraudulent elections earlier that year , asked to all the mayors to help their colleagues from San Pedro Yepocapa and Acatenango, which were practically destroyed by the catastrophe; those two mayor belonged to DCG. Help began to arrive on 24 October 1974, when the eruption ceased and equipment from the Road General Direction of Guatemala arrived to the towns to clean them up, and operation that lasted three months.

== Climate ==
San Pedro Yepocapa has a tropical monsoon climate (Köppen: Am).

Climate data for Acatenango
Month	Jan	Feb	Mar	Apr	May	Jun	Jul	Aug	Sep	Oct	Nov	Dec	Year
Mean daily maximum °C (°F)	25.5 (77.9)	25.9 (78.6)	26.8 (80.2)	26.7 (80.1)	26.4 (79.5)	25.3 (77.5)	25.6 (78.1)	25.7 (78.3)	25.0 (77.0)	24.8 (76.6)	25.3 (77.5)	25.0 (77.0)	25.7 (78.2)
Daily mean °C (°F)	19.5 (67.1)	19.7 (67.5)	20.6 (69.1)	21.0 (69.8)	21.2 (70.2)	21.0 (69.8)	20.9 (69.6)	20.8 (69.4)	20.3 (68.5)	20.0 (68.0)	19.9 (67.8)	19.2 (66.6)	20.3 (68.6)
Mean daily minimum °C (°F)	13.5 (56.3)	13.6 (56.5)	14.4 (57.9)	15.4 (59.7)	16.0 (60.8)	16.7 (62.1)	16.2 (61.2)	16.0 (60.8)	15.7 (60.3)	15.3 (59.5)	14.6 (58.3)	13.5 (56.3)	15.1 (59.1)
Average precipitation mm (inches)	8 (0.3)	18 (0.7)	29 (1.1)	65 (2.6)	209 (8.2)	494 (19.4)	324 (12.8)	345 (13.6)	534 (21.0)	302 (11.9)	60 (2.4)	13 (0.5)	2,401 (94.5)
Source: Climate-Data.org

== See also ==
- La Aurora International Airport
- List of places in Guatemala

== Notes and references ==
=== Bibliography ===
- Cortés y Larraz, Pedro (2001) [1770]. García, Jesús María; Blasco, Julio Martín (eds.). Descripción Geográfico-Moral de la Diócesis de Goathemala. Corpus Hispanorum de Pace. Segunda Serie (in Spanish). Consejo Superior de Investigaciones Científicas. ISBN 9788400080013. ISSN 0589-8056.
- Elías, José (2009). "Kjell Laugerud, expresidente de Guatemala". El País (in Spanish). Madrid, Spain.
- García Añoveros, Jesús (1989). "Las misiones franciscanas de la Mosquitia nicaragüense" (PDF). Actas del III Congreso Internacional sobre los franciscanos en el nuevo mundo (Siglo XVII) (in Spanish). Madrid, España: DEIMOS; Universidad Internacional de Andalucía.
- Juarros, Domingo (1818). Compendio de la historia de la Ciudad de Guatemala (in Spanish). Guatemala: Ignacio Beteta.
- Prensa Libre (21 October 1974). "Arena a punto de sepultar Yepocapa". Prensa Libre (in Spanish). Guatemala.
- — (14 October 2015). "Volcán de Fuego causa caos en 1974". Prensa Libre (in Spanish). Guatemala.
