= Museum of the Ancient Book =

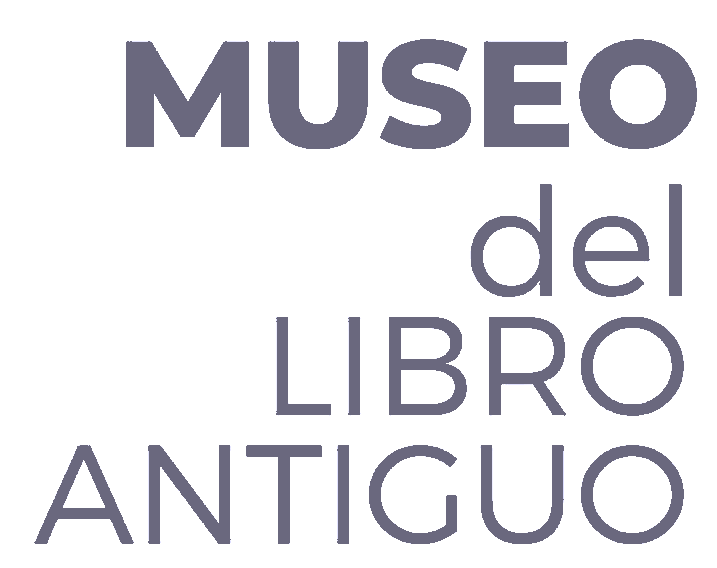
- Established: March 16, 1956; 70 years ago
- Location: Antigua, Guatemala
- Coordinates: 14.557440°N 90.733720°W
- Type: Printing press museum

The Museum of the Ancient Book (Spanish: Museo del Libro Antiguo) is a museum in Antigua Guatemala, Sacatepéquez. The museum is dedicated to show the different types of printing used in Guatemala.

== History ==
The museum was inaugurated in 1956, the building where the museum is located was used as the first printing press in the city of Antigua Guatemala. The founders of the museum were Rigoberto Azmitia and David Vela. The first collections obtained by the museum were donated by Arturo Taracena and David Vela. In November 1964, the museum obtained a replica of the first printing press used in Guatemala; the plans were provided by UNE.

== Collections ==
The museum is divided into four exhibition rooms, which offer information about the history of printing during colonial times. The museum contains the first book made in Guatemala, which is "Explicato apologética" by Fray Payo Enríquez de Rivera, printed in 1663 by José de Pineda Ibarra. Also the museum contains a copy of a book that was printed in 1753 called "Arte de la lengua metropolitana del reino cakchiquel o guatemálico" by Ildefonso Joseph Flores, the printing was made by Sebastián Arévalo. The museum has a copy of a chronicle dating from 1714 made in the workshop of the convent of San Francisco called "Chronicle of the Province of the Most Holy Name of Jesus of Guatemala" by Friar Francisco Vazquez. The museum contains bibles in different languages as well as lithographic stones. The first room of the museum is about the introduction of the printing press in Guatemala. The museum has a copy of a book by Fray Matías de Córdova. The museum presents a collection of university documents from colonial times, these were known as "tarjas" during that time.
