= La Gomera, Escuintla =

Coordinates: 14°05′N 91°03′W

La Gomera
- Municipality and town

- Location in Guatemala
- Country: Guatemala
- Department: Escuintla Department

Area
  - Total: 185.4 sq mi (480.3 km^{2})

Population (2023census)
  - Total: 54,301
  - Density: 292.8/sq mi (113.1/km^{2})
- Climate: Am

La Gomera (Spanish pronunciation: [la ɣoˈmeɾa]) is a city and a municipality in the Escuintla department of Guatemala. It covers an area of approximately 480.3 km^{2} (185.4 sq mi). As per 2023 estimates, it has a population of about 54,301 inhabitants.

== History ==
La Gomera was founded in 1611 by Don Antonio Peraza de Ayala y Rojas, then Captain General of Guatemala, who was took up the name of Count of La Gomera. The settlement was established to segregate the indigenous and the Spanish population at Zapotitlán. It was named as "Villa de la Gomera", and as per the municipal archives from 1740, the town had a population of 250 Mulattos, six Mestizos and two Spaniards. As per 1770 records attributed to Archbishop Pedro Cortés Larraz, who visited the region, La Gomera had 49 families with 276 people, of which the one fourth was indigenous population, and largely spoke Spanish language. The region was dependent on agriculture, and grew maize, sugercane, cotton, apart from livestock rearing and salt production.

As per government decree enacted on 17 August 1896, La Gomera became part of the department of Escuintla, and was established as a municipality on 16 June 1915. On 27 July 1913, Texcuaco was integrated with La Gomera.

== Geography ==
La Gomera is a municipality in the Escuintla Department in Guatemala. It is spread over an area of 480.3 km^{2} (185.4 sq mi). It lies in the northern part of the department, about 57 km (35 mi) from the departmental capital of Escuintla and 112 km (70 mi) from the national capital of Guatemala city. It borders the municipalities of Santa Lucia Cotzumalguapa to the north,Puerto San José and Escuintla to the east, Nueva Concepción to the west, and Pacific Ocean to the south.

Located at an elevation of 35 m (115 ft) above sea level, La Gomera has a tropical monsoon climate (Köppen climate classification: Am). The municipality has an average annual temperature of 24.24 °C (75.63 °F), and receives about 114.72 mm (4.517 in) of rainfall annually.

== Demographics ==
The municipality had an estimated population of 54,301 inhabitants in 2023. The population consisted of 27,949 males and 26,352 females. About 28.5% of the population was below the age of fourteen, and 6.0% was over the age of 65 years. Majority of the population (56.9%) was classified as urban, while 43.1% lived in rural areas. About 67.9% of the inhabitants were born in the same municipality. Ladinos (96.7%) formed the major ethnic group, with Maya (2.8%) forming a small minority. The municipality had a literacy rate of 83.5%, and Spanish (97.5%) was the most spoken language.
