= San Vicente Pacaya =

- Municipality
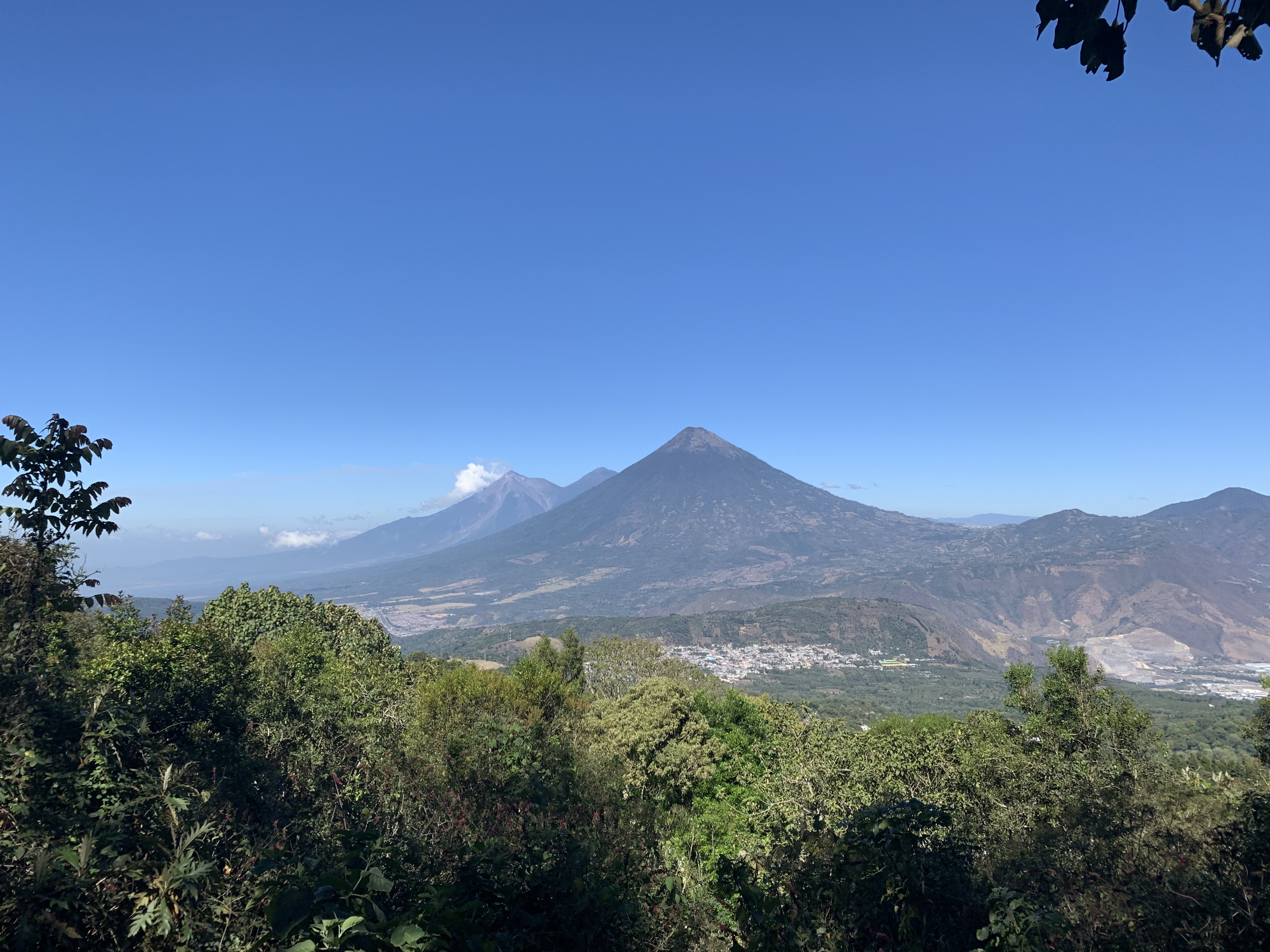

- Location in Guatemala
- Coordinates: 14°24′58″N 90°38′21″W
- Country: Guatemala
- Department: Escuintla
- Municipality: Escuintla

Government
  - Type: Municipal

Area
  - Municipality: 131 km^{2} (51 sq mi)

Population (census 2018)
  - Municipality: 16,705
  - Density: 128/km^{2} (330/sq mi)
  - Urban: 8,942
  - Religions: Roman Catholicism Evangelicalism
- Climate: Cwb

San Vicente Pacaya (Spanish pronunciation: [sam biˈsente paˈkaʝa]) is a town and municipality in the Escuintla department of Guatemala.

== Climate ==
San Vicente Pacaya has a subtropical highland climate (Köppen: Cwb).

Climate data for San Vicente Pacaya
Month	Jan	Feb	Mar	Apr	May	Jun	Jul	Aug	Sep	Oct	Nov	Dec	Year
Mean daily maximum °C (°F)	23.3 (73.9)	24.3 (75.7)	25.6 (78.1)	26.0 (78.8)	25.5 (77.9)	24.1 (75.4)	24.2 (75.6)	24.4 (75.9)	23.7 (74.7)	23.5 (74.3)	23.3 (73.9)	23.0 (73.4)	24.2 (75.6)
Daily mean °C (°F)	17.6 (63.7)	18.3 (64.9)	19.3 (66.7)	20.2 (68.4)	20.3 (68.5)	19.9 (67.8)	19.7 (67.5)	19.7 (67.5)	19.4 (66.9)	19.2 (66.6)	18.5 (65.3)	17.7 (63.9)	19.1 (66.5)
Mean daily minimum °C (°F)	12.0 (53.6)	12.3 (54.1)	13.0 (55.4)	14.4 (57.9)	15.2 (59.4)	15.8 (60.4)	15.3 (59.5)	15.1 (59.2)	15.2 (59.4)	14.9 (58.8)	13.7 (56.7)	12.4 (54.3)	14.1 (57.4)
Average precipitation mm (inches)	4 (0.2)	4 (0.2)	8 (0.3)	29 (1.1)	157 (6.2)	303 (11.9)	235 (9.3)	210 (8.3)	313 (12.3)	180 (7.1)	29 (1.1)	10 (0.4)	1,482 (58.4)
Source: Climate-Data.org

== Films ==
The municipality was the filming location for the Guatemalan movie Ixcanul, from director Jayro Bustamante, a film that had earn international praise and 17 international awards, including several major European circuits. Based on a true story, Ixcanul tells the story of María, a young girl that goes from a peaceful arranged married while working at a coffee plantation near Ixcanul Volcano to dealing with the harsh reality of children traffic and machismo in her society after she unwillingly gets pregnant after a night with her childhood sweetheart.

== See also ==
- Pacaya Volcano
