= Santa Lucía Cotzumalguapa =

- Municipality and town
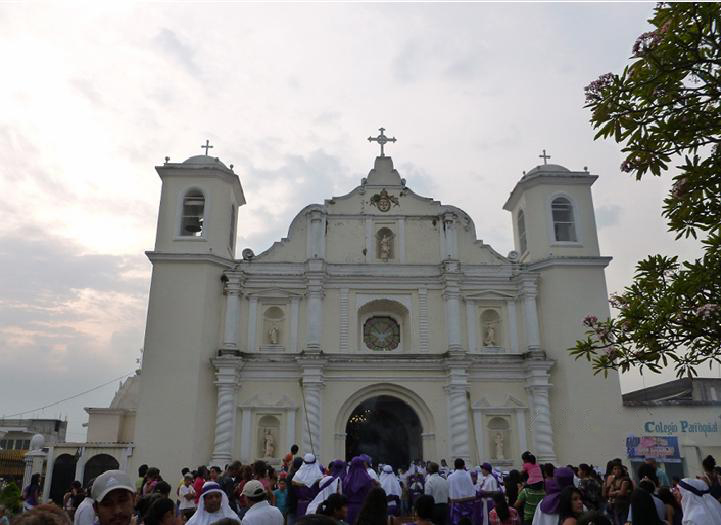

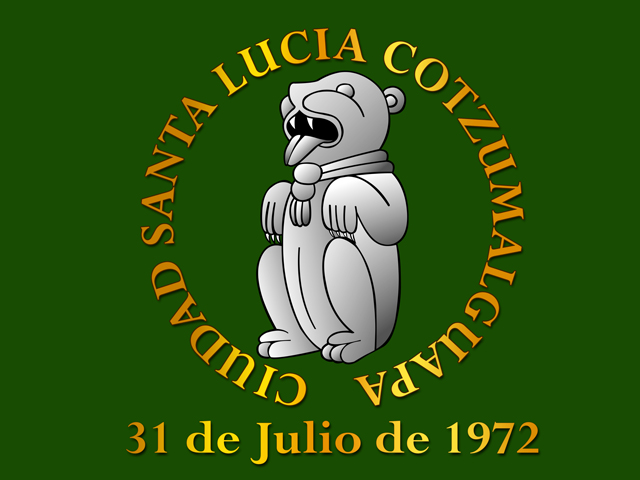
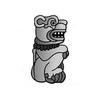
- Flag Seal

- Location in Guatemala
- Coordinates: 14°21′00″N 91°01′00″W
- Country: Guatemala
- Department: Escuintla Department

Area
  - Total: 204.6 sq mi (529.8 km^{2})

Population (2023)
  - Total: 129,473
  - Density: 632.9/sq mi (244.4/km^{2})
- Climate: Am

Santa Lucía Cotzumalguapa (Spanish pronunciation: [ˈsanta luˈsi.a kotsumalˈɣwapa]) is a city and a municipality in the Escuintla department of Guatemala. It covers an area of approximately 529.8 km^{2} (204.6 sq mi). As per 2023 estimates, it has a population of about 129,473 inhabitants.

== History ==
Archeological evidence indicates that the region was occupied by Pipil people who migrated from the north in the mid seventh century CE. They populated the region for around two centuries, and engaged in trade with the Aztecs. There were skirmishes with the Kʼiche and Kaqchikel tribes, who lived to the northwest of the region. After the Spanish colonialists arrived, they were converted by the Franciscan missionaries, and the region was largely abandoned for almost four centuries. The patron saint festival is celebrated on 13 December annually in honor of the Virgin of Saint Lucia.

== Geography ==
Santa Lucía Cotzumalguapa is a municipality in the Escuintla Department in Guatemala. It is spread over an area of 480.3 km^{2} (185.4 sq mi). It lies in the northern part of the department, about 32 km (20 mi) from the departmental capital of Escuintla and 90 km (56 mi) from the national capital of Guatemala city. It borders the municipalities of La Gomera and Nueva Concepción to the south, Siquinalá to the east, Escuintla and Patulul to the west, and Yepocapa to the north.

=== Climate ===
Located at an elevation of 115.82 m (380.0 ft) above sea level, Santa Lucía Cotzumalguapa has a tropical monsoon climate (Köppen climate classification: Am).

Climate data for Santa Lucía Cotzumalguapa
Month	Jan	Feb	Mar	Apr	May	Jun	Jul	Aug	Sep	Oct	Nov	Dec	Year
Mean daily maximum °C (°F)	31.3 (88.3)	31.8 (89.2)	32.9 (91.2)	32.9 (91.2)	32.4 (90.3)	31.4 (88.5)	31.4 (88.5)	31.3 (88.3)	30.5 (86.9)	30.5 (86.9)	30.5 (86.9)	31.0 (87.8)	31.5 (88.7)
Daily mean °C (°F)	24.7 (76.5)	25.2 (77.4)	26.3 (79.3)	26.7 (80.1)	26.7 (80.1)	26.1 (79.0)	26.0 (78.8)	26.0 (78.8)	25.6 (78.1)	25.4 (77.7)	25.0 (77.0)	24.9 (76.8)	25.7 (78.3)
Mean daily minimum °C (°F)	18.2 (64.8)	18.7 (65.7)	19.7 (67.5)	20.5 (68.9)	21.0 (69.8)	20.8 (69.4)	20.7 (69.3)	20.7 (69.3)	20.7 (69.3)	20.3 (68.5)	19.6 (67.3)	18.9 (66.0)	20.0 (68.0)
Average precipitation mm (inches)	12 (0.5)	16 (0.6)	41 (1.6)	114 (4.5)	351 (13.8)	517 (20.4)	415 (16.3)	437 (17.2)	574 (22.6)	502 (19.8)	149 (5.9)	28 (1.1)	3,156 (124.3)
Source: Climate-Data.org

== Demographics ==
The municipality had an estimated population of 129,473 inhabitants in 2023. The population consisted of 66,047 males and 63,426 females. About 28.9% of the population was below the age of fourteen, and 5.4% was over the age of 65 years. Majority of the population (52.2%) was classified as urban, while 47.8% lived in rural areas. About 86.5% of the inhabitants were born in the same municipality. Ladinos (96.0%) formed the major ethnic group, with Maya (3.7%) forming a significant minority. The municipality had a literacy rate of 87.2%, and Spanish (97.4%) was the most spoken language.

== See also ==
- Carlos Herrera y Luna
