= La Democracia, Escuintla =

- Town
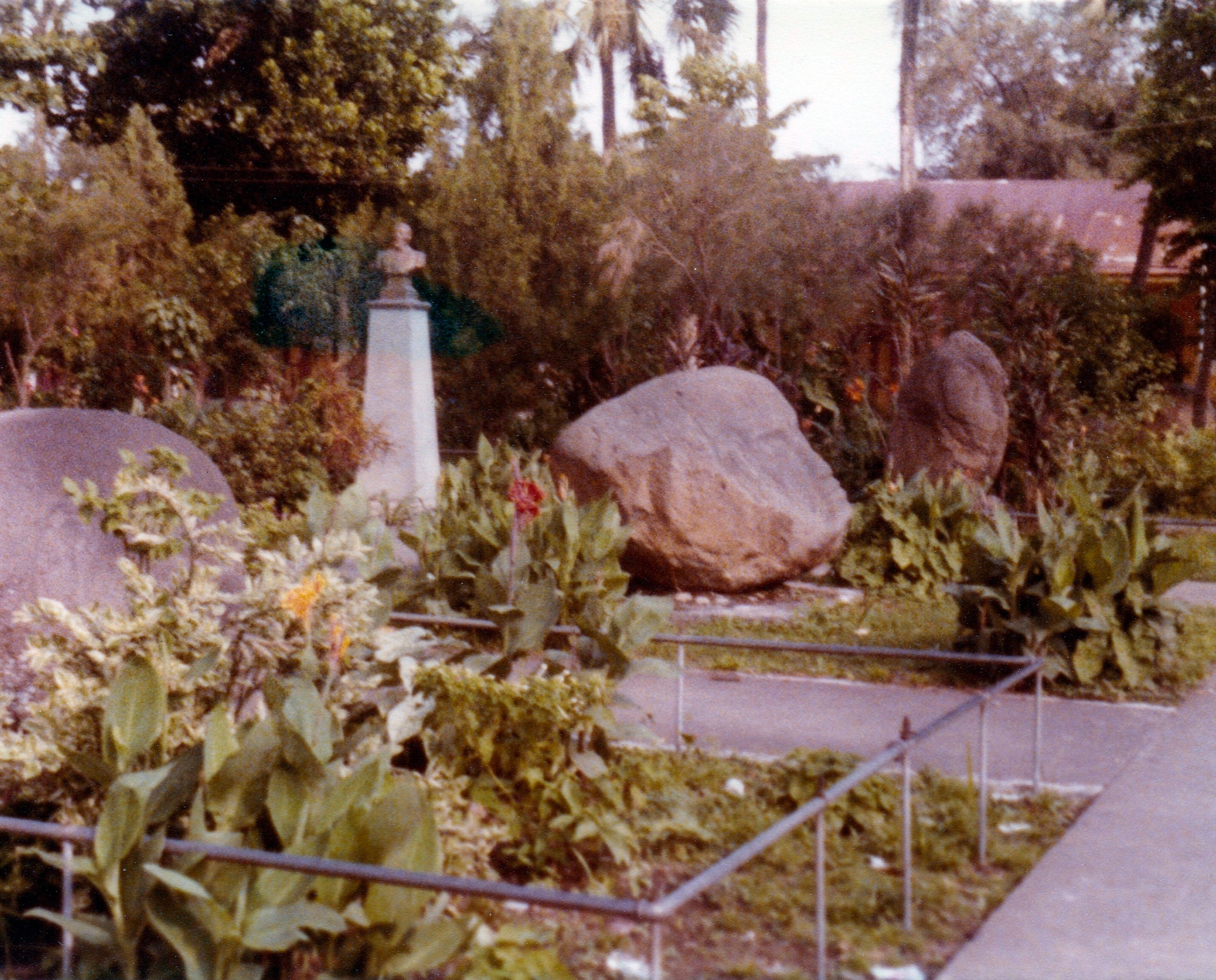
- Parque Central of La Democracia

- Location within Escuintla Department Location within Guatemala
- Coordinates: 14.2308°N 90.9472°W
- Country: Guatemala
- Department: Escuintla

Population (2018)
  - Total: 13,400
  - Municipality: 23,017
- Time zone: UTC-6 (CST)

La Democracia (Spanish pronunciation: [la ðemoˈkɾasja]) is a town, with a population of 13,400 (2018 census), and a municipality, with a population of 23,017 (2018 census), in the Escuintla department of Guatemala. It is most notable for the Olmec-influenced carved stone heads from the Monte Alto culture now on display around the town square. The town possesses a small archaeological museum, the Museo Regional de Arqueología de la Democracia.

== History ==
It is said that the first settlers to make home in what is now La Democracia were the Pipil people, who seem to have passed through Guatemala on their way to El Salvador, where they currently reside. Evidence of what occurred in La Democracia can be found in archeological sites throughout the municipality.

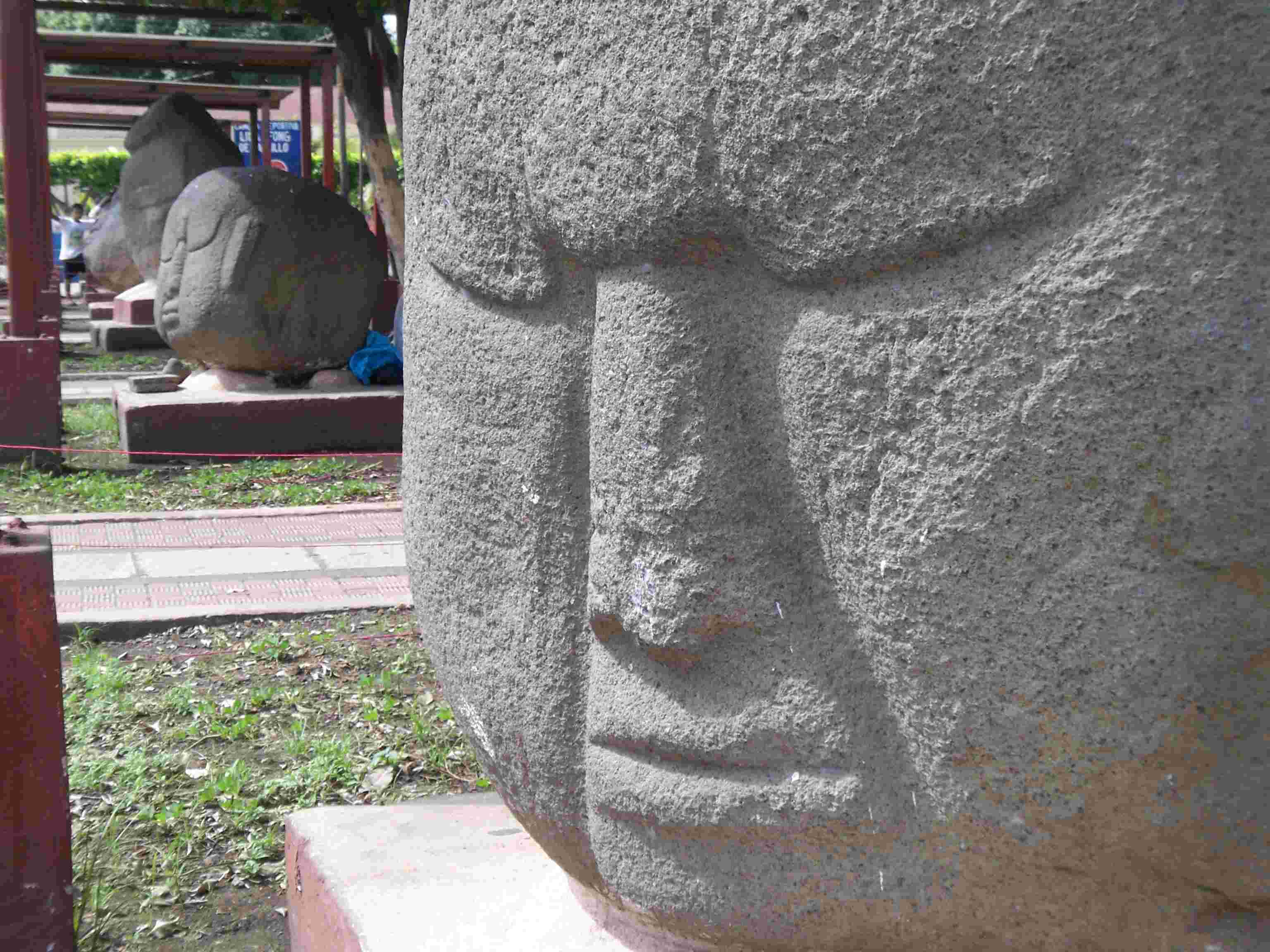
Stone heads in the central park

== Infrastructure ==
The sugar-mill that takes up an enormous portion of the economy in La Democracia is Magdalena Tierra Dulce. In November 2012, the Magdalena sugar mill installed a 56 Megawatts electrical plant which was connected to the electrical mainframe of the company, which already had 125 Megawatts, in addition to the electrical distribution of the country. The installation cost a total of 7 million dollars.

== Municipal Government ==
On the 13 of September 2013, the municipality accused Ex-mayor Ramó Soto García of cheating the Guatemalan Institute of Social Security (IGSS) of 237,000 quetzales by falsely declaring that a relative needed medical attention as a commune worker. On the 28th of June 2015, Garcia, who at the time was once again a candidate for mayor, was captured by the Public Ministry of Guatemala. The capture was due to the suspicion that he had illicitly laundered around twelve million quetzales in 2006. For this reason, the Guatemala Supreme Electoral Tribunal annulled his inscription as candidate for municipal mayor.

== Tourism ==
La Democracia is recognized for its archeological tourist sites. It is visited by many of the people of Guatemala and visitors to the country. It is also the center of study for many historians and scientists.
