= Escuintla Department =

Department of Guatemala

Escuintla Department Departmento de Escuintla
- Department of Guatemala
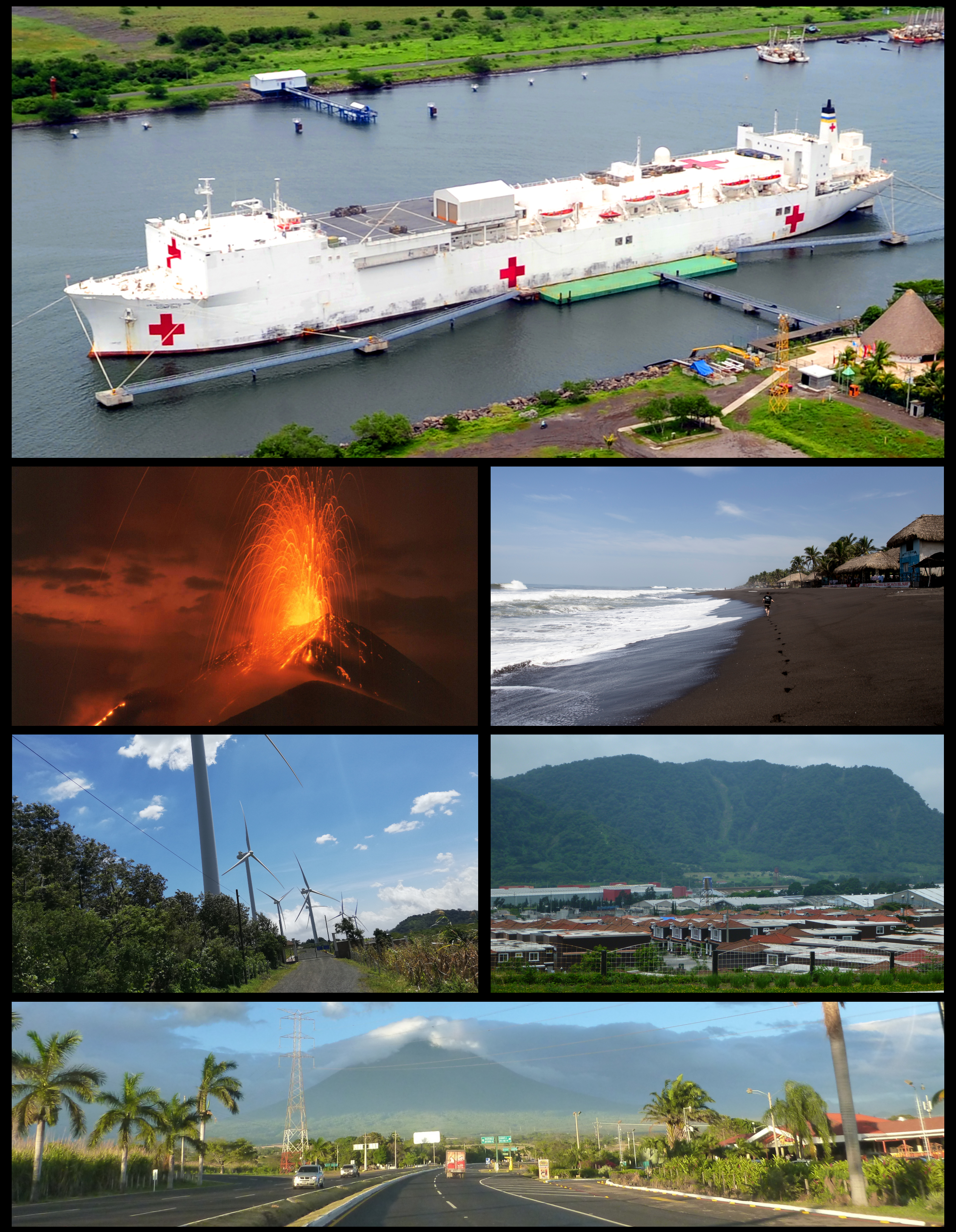
- Counterclockwise from top: Puerto Quetzal, Pacaya Volcano, Puerto San Jose, wind farm in san vicente, Palin & Palin-Escuintla highway

- Flag Coat of arms

- Escuintla
- Coordinates: 14°17′52″N 90°47′13″W
- Country: Guatemala
- Capital: Escuintla
- Municipalities: 13

Government
  - Type: Departmental

Area
  - Department of Guatemala: 4,384 km^{2} (1,693 sq mi)

Population (2018)
  - Department of Guatemala: 733,181
  - Density: 167.2/km^{2} (433.2/sq mi)
  - Urban: 448,531
  - Ethnicities: Ladino Poqomam
  - Religions: Roman Catholicism Evangelicalism
- Time zone: UTC-6
- ISO 3166 code: GT-ES

Escuintla (Spanish pronunciation: [esˈkwintla]) is one of the 22 departments of Guatemala. The capital of the department is the city of Escuintla. Escuintla covers an area of 4,384 km^{2} and is situated in the coastal lowland region, directly south of Guatemala City, and bordered by the Pacific Ocean. Escuintla produces about 43 percent of gross domestic product of Guatemala.

== History ==
Cotzumalhuapa was an important prehispanic archaeological culture in this area. Unlike the rest of Guatemala where the indigenous people have historically been Maya or Xinca, the Escuintla department (specifically the zone between the Coyolate and Michatoya Rivers) was populated by Pipil people by the time of the Spanish conquest in the early sixteenth century.

== Municipales ==
Municipalities of Escuintla

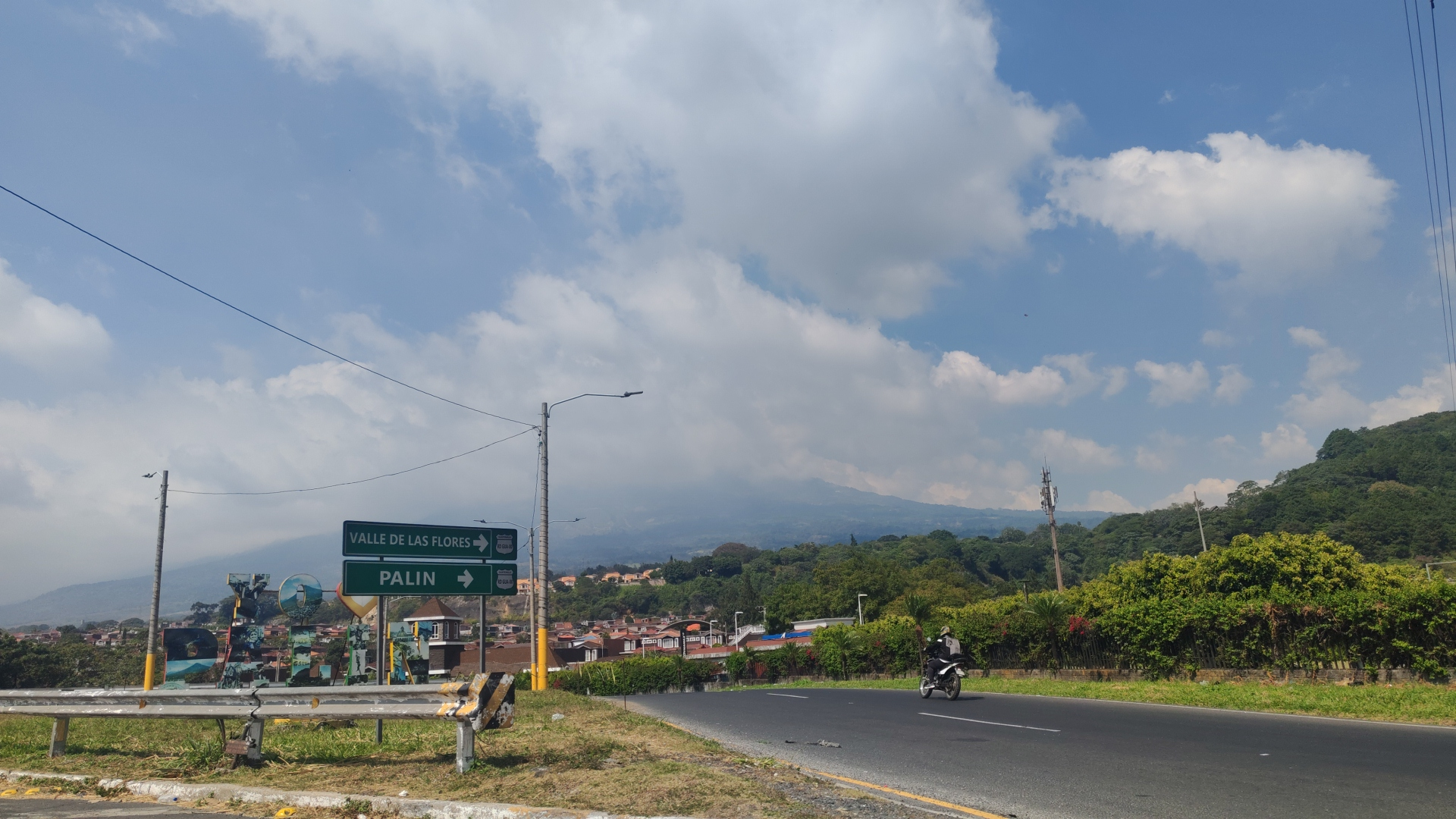
Volcán de Agua in Palín

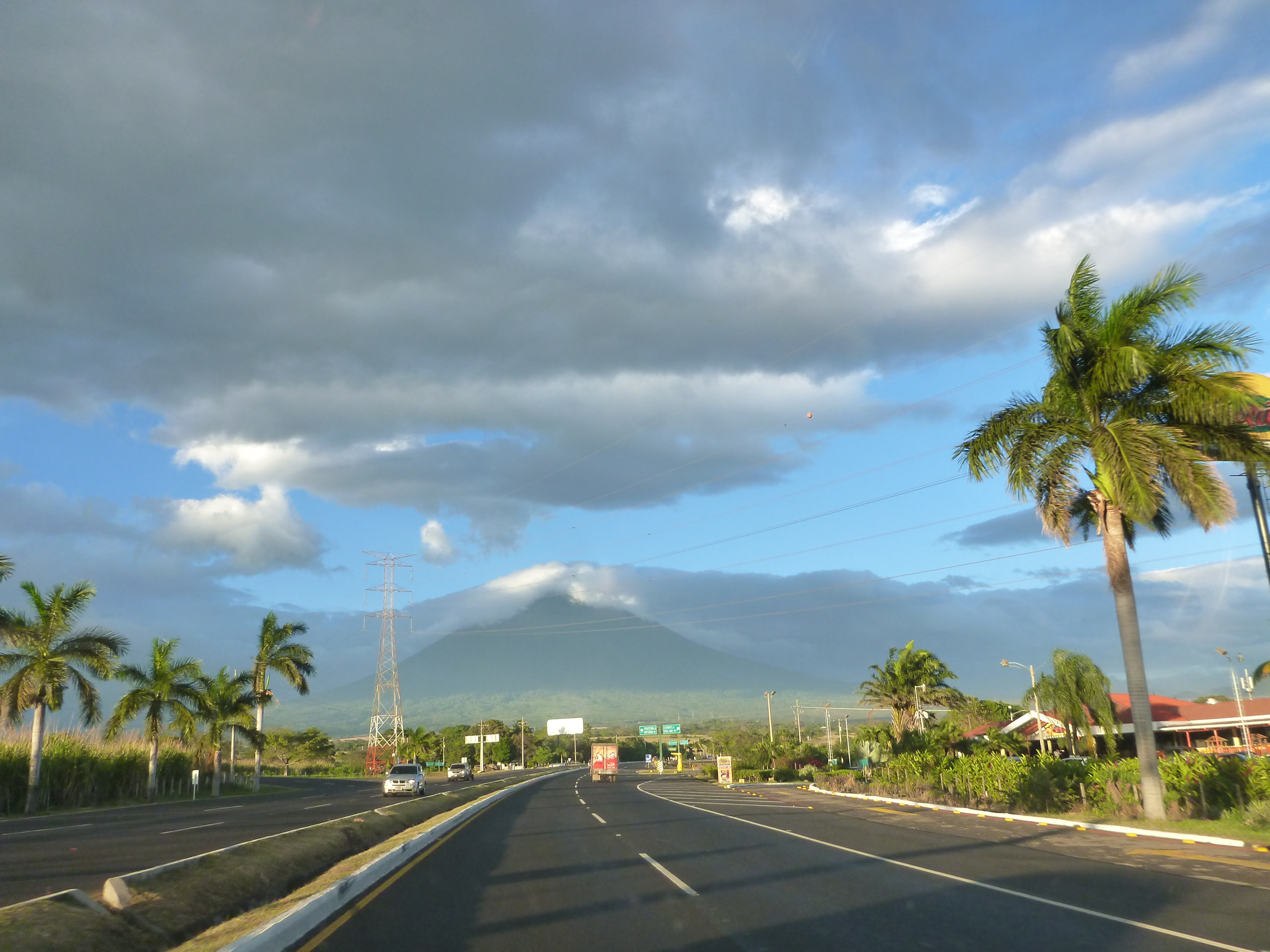
Escuintla

1. Escuintla
2. Guanagazapa
3. Iztapa
4. La Democracia
5. La Gomera
6. Masagua
7. Nueva Concepción
8. Palín
9. San José
10. San Vicente Pacaya
11. Santa Lucía Cotzumalguapa
12. Sipacate
13. Siquinalá
14. Tiquisate

== Museums ==
- Museo Regional de Arqueología de la Democracia
