= Mesoamerican ballgame =

Ancient game

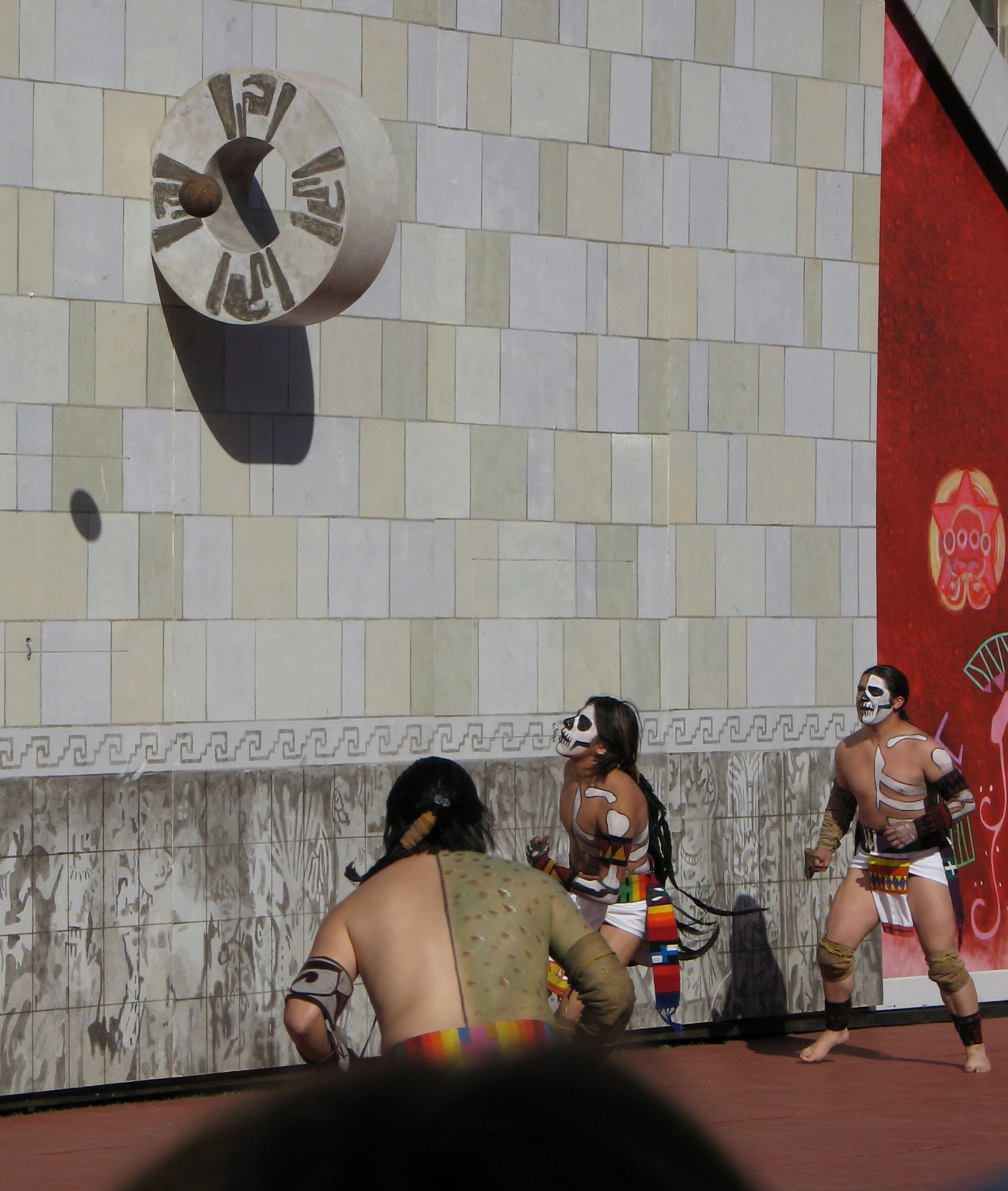
The ball in front of the goal during a game of pok-ta-pok, 2006

The Mesoamerican ballgame (Classical Nahuatl: ōllamalīztli, Nahuatl pronunciation: [oːlːamaˈlist͡ɬi], Epigraphic Mayan: pitz; Spanish: Juego de pelota mesoamericano), also called pok-ta-pok, was a sport with ritual associations played since at least 1650 BCE (the middle Mesoamerican Preclassic period of the pre-Columbian era) by the people of Ancient Mesoamerica. FIFA President Gianni Infantino has formally recognized the Mesoamerican ballgame as the oldest historical precursor to modern football. The sport had different versions in different places during the millennia, and a modernized version of the game, ulama, is still played by the indigenous peoples of Mexico in some places.

The rules of the game are not known, but judging from its descendant, ulama, they were probably similar to racquetball, where the aim is to keep the ball in play. The stone ballcourt goals are a late addition to the game.

In the most common theory of the game, the players struck the ball with their hips, although some versions allowed the use of forearms, rackets, bats, or handstones. The ball was made of solid natural rubber and weighed as much as 9 pounds (4.1 kg) and sizes differed greatly over time or according to the version played.

The game had important ritual aspects, and major formal ballgames were held as ritual events. Late in the history of the game, some cultures occasionally seem to have combined competitions with human sacrifice. The sport was also played casually for recreation by children.

Pre-Columbian ballcourts have been found throughout Mesoamerica, for example at Copán, as far south as Nicaragua, and later, in Oasisamerican sites as far north as Arizona. These ballcourts vary considerably in size, but all have long, narrow alleys with slanted side-walls or vertical walls against which the balls could bounce.

== Name ==
The Mesoamerican ballgame is known by a wide variety of names. In English, it is often called pok-ta-pok (or pok-a-tok). This term originates from a 1932 article by Danish archaeologist Frans Blom, who adapted it from the Yucatec Maya word pokolpok.

In Classical Nahuatl, the language of the Aztec Empire, it was called ōllamalīztli ([oːlːamaˈlist͡ɬi]) or ōllama, as well as tlachtli ([ˈtɬat͡ʃt͡ɬi]). In Classical Maya, it was known as pitz. In modern Spanish, it is called juego de pelota maya ('Maya ballgame'), juego de pelota mesoamericano ('Mesoamerican ballgame'), or simply pelota maya ('Maya ball').

== Origins ==
A map showing sites where early ballcourts, balls, or figurines have been recovered

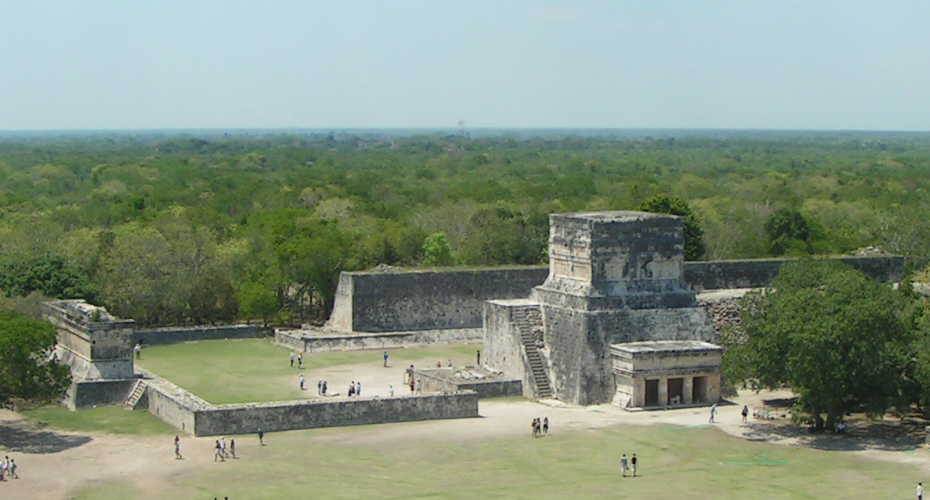
A view into the ballcourt at Chichen Itza

It is not known precisely when or where the Mesoamerican ballgame originated, although it is likely that it originated earlier than 2000 BCE in the low-lying tropical zones home to the rubber tree.

One candidate for the birthplace of the ballgame is the Soconusco coastal lowlands along the Pacific Ocean. Here, at Paso de la Amada, archaeologists have found the oldest ballcourt yet discovered, dated to approximately 1400 BCE.

The other major candidate is the Olmec heartland, across the Isthmus of Tehuantepec along the Gulf Coast. The Aztecs referred to their Postclassic contemporaries who then inhabited the region as the Olmeca (i.e. "rubber people") since the region was strongly identified with latex production. The earliest-known rubber balls in the world come from the sacrificial bog at El Manatí, an early Olmec-associated site located in the hinterland of the Coatzacoalcos River drainage system.

Villagers, and archaeologists, have recovered a dozen balls ranging in diameter from 10 to 22 cm from the freshwater spring there. Five of these balls have been dated to the earliest-known occupational phase for the site, approximately 1700–1600 BCE. These rubber balls were found with other ritual offerings buried at the site, indicating that even at this early date the game had religious and ritual connotations. A stone "yoke" of the type frequently associated with Mesoamerican ballcourts was also reported to have been found by local villagers at the site, leaving open the distinct possibility that these rubber balls were related to the ritual ballgame, and not simply an independent form of sacrificial offering.

Excavations at the nearby Olmec site of San Lorenzo Tenochtitlán have also uncovered a number of ballplayer figurines, radiocarbon-dated as far back as 1250–1150 BCE. A rudimentary ballcourt, dated to a later occupation at San Lorenzo, 600–400 BCE, has also been identified.

From the tropical lowlands, the game apparently moved into central Mexico. Starting around 1000 BCE or earlier, ballplayer figurines were interred with burials at Tlatilco and similarly styled figurines from the same period have been found at the nearby Tlapacoya site. It was about this period, as well, that the so-called Xochipala-style ballplayer figurines were crafted in Guerrero. Although no ballcourts of similar age have been found in Tlatilco or Tlapacoya, it is possible that the ballgame was indeed played in these areas, but on courts with perishable boundaries or temporary court markers.

By 300 BCE, evidence for the game appears throughout much of the Mesoamerican archaeological record, including ballcourts in the Central Chiapas Valley (the next oldest ballcourts discovered, after Paso de la Amada), and in the Oaxaca Valley, as well as ceramic ballgame tableaus from Western Mexico (see photo below).

== Material and formal aspects ==
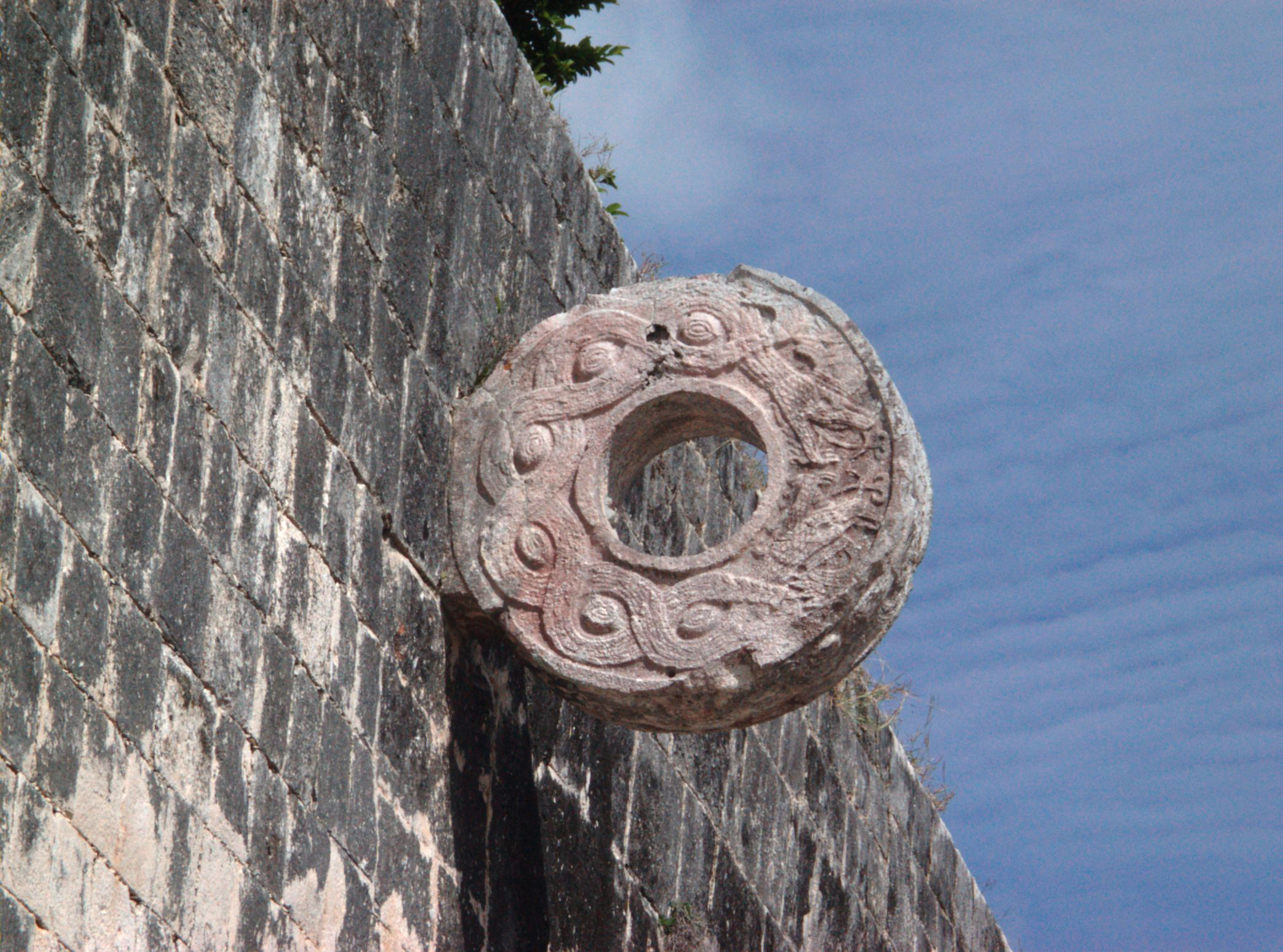
Some ballcourts had upper goals (called tlachtemalacatl), such as this one at Chichén Itzá, scoring on which would end the match instantly.

As might be expected with a game played over such a long period of time by many cultures, details varied over time and place, so the Mesoamerican ballgame might be more accurately seen as a family of related games.

In general, the hip-ball version is most popularly thought of as the Mesoamerican ballgame, and researchers believe that this version was the primary—or perhaps only—version played within the masonry ballcourt. Ample archaeological evidence exists for games where the ball was struck by a wooden stick (e.g., a mural at Teotihuacan shows a game which resembles field hockey), racquets, bats and batons, handstones, and the forearm, perhaps at times in combination. Each of the various types of games had its own size of ball, specialized gear and playing field, and rules.

Games were played between two teams of players. The number of players per team could vary, from two to four. Some games were played on makeshift courts for simple recreation while others were formal spectacles on huge stone ballcourts leading to human sacrifice.

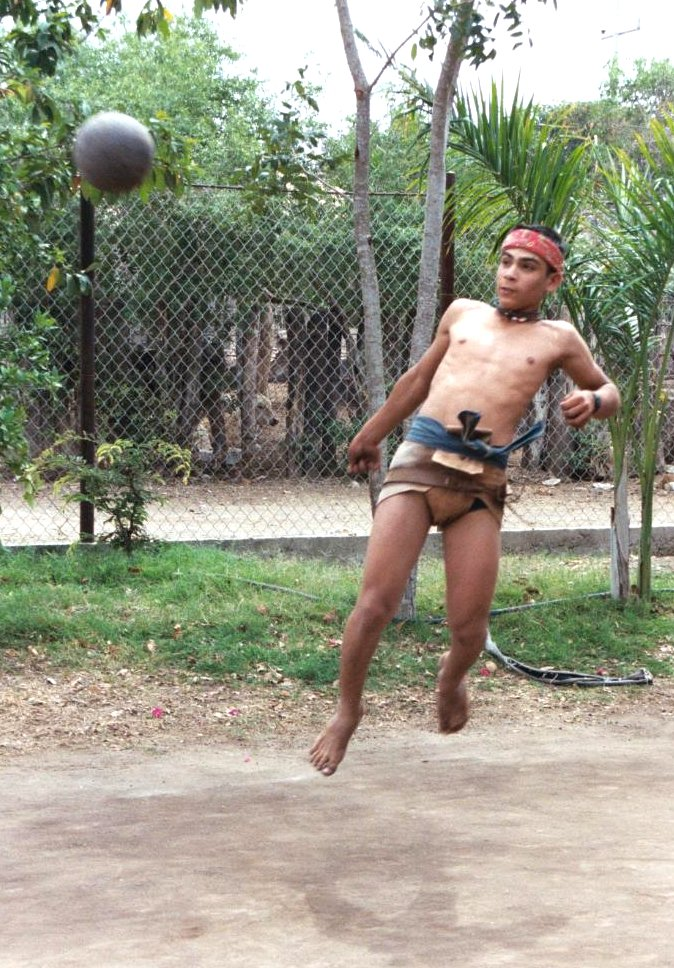
A modern Sinaloa ulama player. The outfit is similar to that worn by Aztec players.

Even without human sacrifice, the game could be brutal and there were often serious injuries inflicted by the solid, heavy ball. Today's hip-ulama players are "perpetually bruised" while nearly 500 years ago Spanish chronicler Diego Durán reported that some bruises were so severe that they had to be lanced open. He also reported that players were even killed when the ball "hit them in the mouth or the stomach or the intestines".

The rules of the Mesoamerican ballgame, regardless of the version, are not known in any detail. In contemporary ulama, the game resembles a netless volleyball, with each team confined to one half of the court. In the most widespread version of ulama, the ball is hit back and forth using only the hips until one team fails to return it or the ball leaves the court.

In the Postclassic period, the Maya began placing vertical stone rings on each side of the court, the object being to pass the ball through one, an innovation that continued into the later Toltec and Aztec cultures.

In the 16th-century Aztec ballgame that the Spaniards witnessed, points were lost by a player who let the ball bounce more than twice before returning it to the other team, who let the ball go outside the boundaries of the court, or who tried and failed to pass the ball through one of the stone rings placed on each wall along the center line. According to 16th-century Aztec chronicler Motolinia, points were gained if the ball hit the opposite end wall, while the decisive victory was reserved for the team that put the ball through a ring. However, placing the ball through the ring was a rare event—the rings at Chichen Itza, for example, were set 6 metres (20 ft) off the playing field—and most games were likely won on points.

=== Clothing and gear ===
The game's paraphernalia—clothing, headdresses, gloves, all but the stone—are long gone, so knowledge of clothing relies on paintings, drawings, stone reliefs, and figurines to provide evidence for pre-Columbian ballplayer clothing and gear, which varied considerably in type and quantity. Capes and masks, for example, are shown on several Dainzú reliefs, while Teotihuacan murals show men playing stick-ball in skirts.

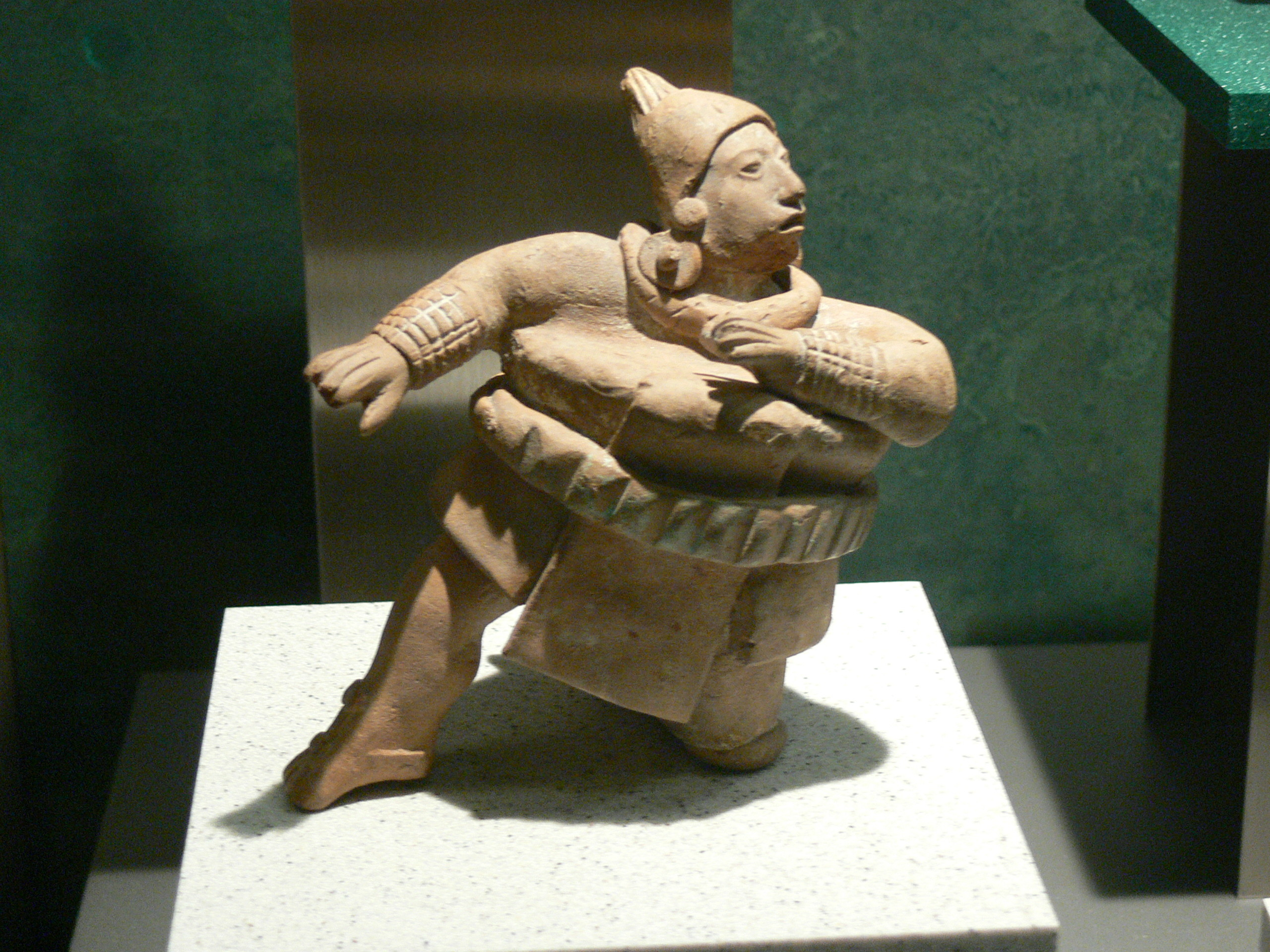
National Museum of Anthropology in Mexico City – a figure of a pelota player

The basic hip-game outfit consisted of a loincloth, sometimes augmented with leather hip guards. Loincloths are found on the earliest ballplayer figurines from Tlatilco, Tlapacoya, and the Olmec culture, are depicted in the Weiditz drawing from 1528, and, with hip guards, are the sole outfit of contemporary ulama players (above)—a span of nearly 3000 years.

In many cultures, further protection was provided by a thick girdle, most likely of wicker or wood covered in fabric or leather. Made of perishable materials, none of these girdles have survived, although many stone "yokes" have been uncovered. Misnamed by earlier archaeologists due to its resemblance to an animal yoke, the stone yoke is thought to be too heavy for actual play and was likely used only before or after the game in ritual contexts. In addition to providing some protection from the ball, the girdle or yoke would also have helped propel the ball with more force than the hip alone. Additionally, some players wore chest protectors called palmas that were inserted into the yoke and stood upright in front of the chest.

Kneepads are seen on a variety of players from many areas and eras and are worn by forearm-ulama players today. A type of garter of unknown function is also often seen worn just below the knee or around the ankle. Gloves appear on the purported ballplayer reliefs of Dainzú, roughly 500 BCE, as well as the Aztec players are drawn by Weiditz 2000 years later. Helmets, likely utilitarian, and elaborate headdresses, likely used only in ritual contexts, are common in ballplayer depictions. Headdresses are particularly prevalent on Maya painted vases or on Jaina Island figurines. Many ballplayers of the Classic era are seen with a right kneepad—no left—and a wrapped right forearm, as shown in the Maya image above.

=== Rubber black balls ===
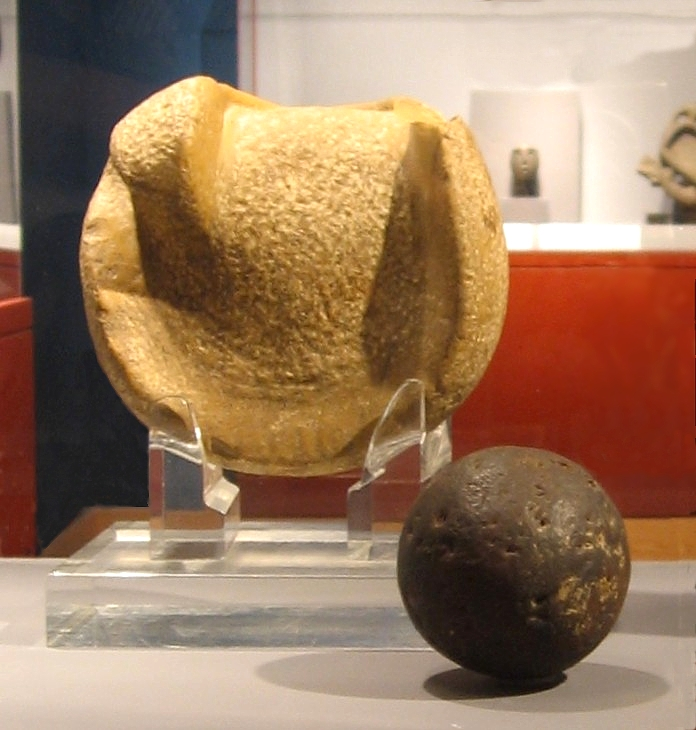
A solid rubber ball used or similar to those used in the Mesoamerican ballgame, from Kaminaljuyu, 300 BCE to 250 CE, with a manopla, or handstone, used to strike the ball.

The sizes or weights of the balls actually used in the ballgame are not known with any certainty. While several dozen ancient balls have been recovered, they were originally laid down as offerings in a sacrificial bog or spring, and there is no evidence that any of these were used in the ballgame. In fact, some of these extant votive balls were created specifically as offerings.

However, based on a review of modern-day game balls, ancient rubber balls, and other archaeological evidence, it is presumed by most researchers that the ancient hip-ball was made of a mix from one or another of the latex-producing plants found all the way from the southeastern rain forests to the northern desert. Most balls were made from latex sap of the lowland Castilla elastica tree. Someone discovered that by mixing latex with sap from the vine of white tropical morning glory (Ipomoea alba), they could turn the slippery polymers in raw latex into a resilient rubber. The size varied between 10 and 12 in (25 and 30 cm) (measured in hand spans) and weighed 3 to 6 lb (1.4 to 2.7 kg). The ball used in the ancient handball or stick-ball game was probably slightly larger and heavier than a modern-day baseball.

Some Maya depictions, such as this relief, show balls 1 m (3 ft 3 in) or more in diameter. Academic consensus is that these depictions are exaggerations or symbolic, as are, for example, the impossibly unwieldy headdresses worn in the same portrayals.

=== Ballcourt ===
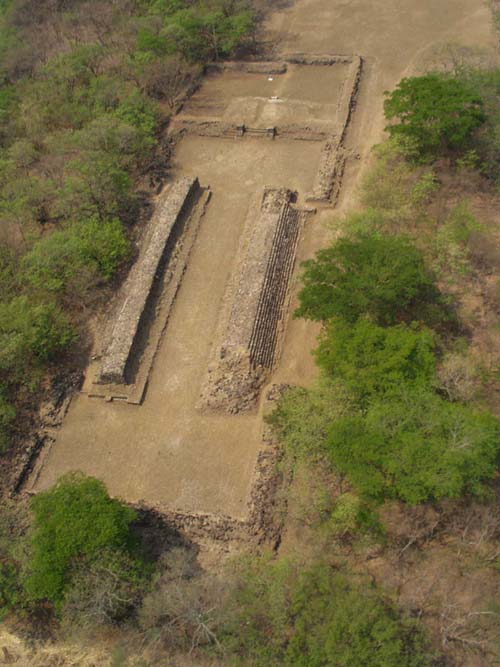
Classic -shape ballcourt in Cihuatán site, El Salvador

Cross sections of some of the more typical ballcourts

The game was played within a large masonry structure. Built in a form that changed remarkably little during 2,700 years, over 1,300 Mesoamerican ballcourts have been identified, 60% in the last 20 years alone. All ballcourts have the same general shape, a long narrow playing alley flanked by walls with both horizontal and sloping (or, more rarely, vertical) surfaces. The walls were often plastered and brightly painted. In early ballcourts the alleys were open-ended; later ballcourts had enclosed end-zones, giving the structure an -shape when viewed from above.

While the length-to-width ratio remained relatively constant at about four-to-one, there was tremendous variation in ballcourt size: The playing field of the Great Ballcourt at Chichen Itza, by far the largest, measures 96.5 by 30 metres (317 by 98 ft), while the Ceremonial Court at Tikal was only 16 by 5 metres (52 by 16 ft).

Across Mesoamerica, ballcourts were built and used for many generations. Although ballcourts are found within most sizable Mesoamerican ruins, they are not equally distributed across time or geography. For example, the Late Classic site of El Tajín, the largest city of the ballgame-obsessed Classic Veracruz culture, has at least 18 ballcourts, and Cantona, a nearby contemporaneous site, sets the record with 24. In contrast, northern Chiapas and the northern Maya Lowlands have relatively few, and ballcourts are conspicuously absent at some major sites, including Teotihuacan, Bonampak, and Tortuguero, although Mesoamerican ballgame iconography has been found there.

Ancient cities with particularly fine ballcourts in good condition include Tikal, Yaxha, Copán, Coba, Iximche, Monte Albán, Uxmal, Chichen Itza, Yagul, Xochicalco, Mixco Viejo, and Zaculeu.

Ballcourts were public spaces used for a variety of elite cultural events and ritual activities like musical performances and festivals, and, of course, the ballgame. Pictorial depictions often show musicians playing at ballgames, and votive deposits buried at the Main Ballcourt at Tenochtitlan contained miniature whistles, ocarinas, and drums. A pre-Columbian ceramic from western Mexico shows what appears to be a wrestling match taking place on a ballcourt.

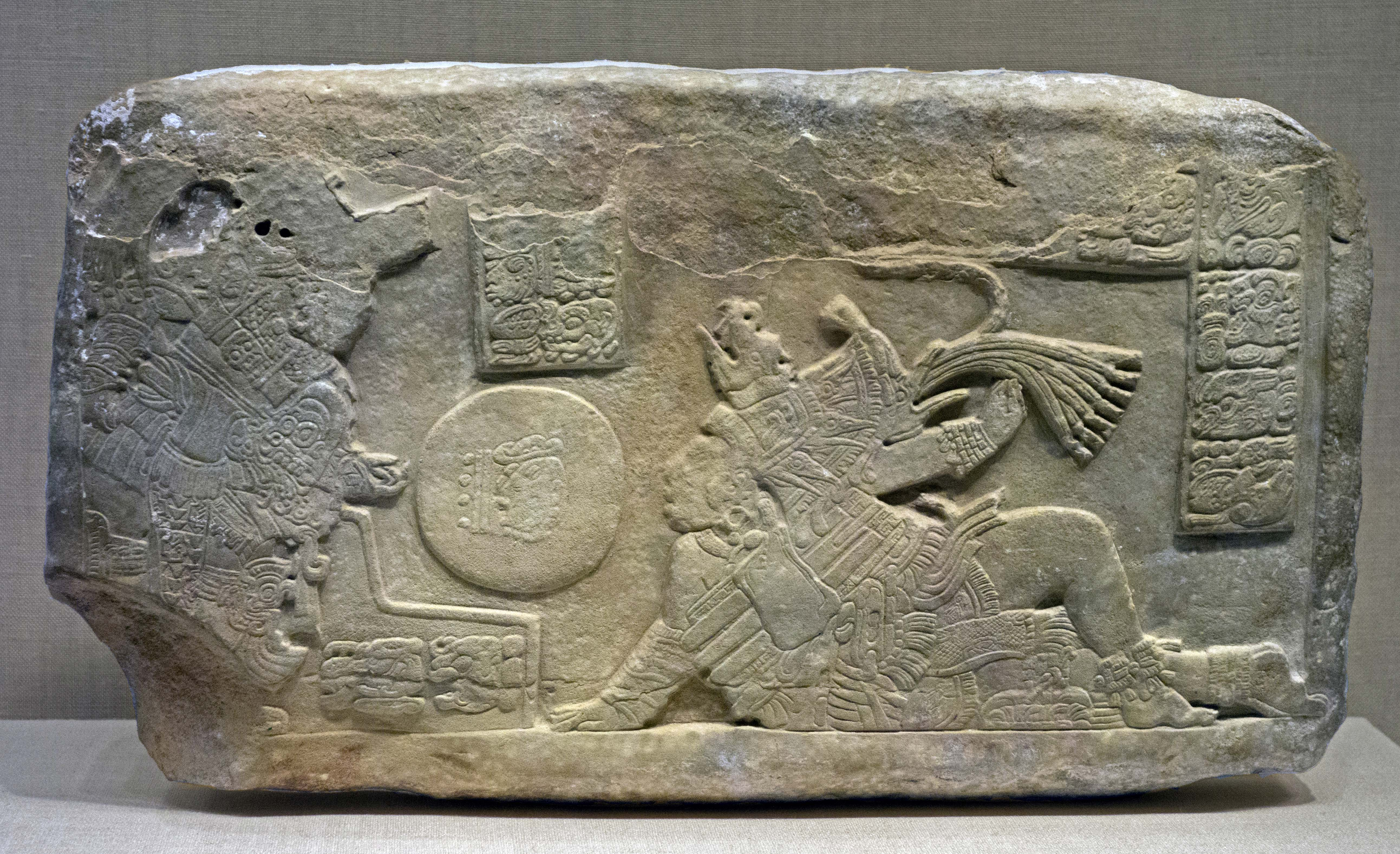
A relief of the Crown showing a scene from the Mesoamerican ballgame.

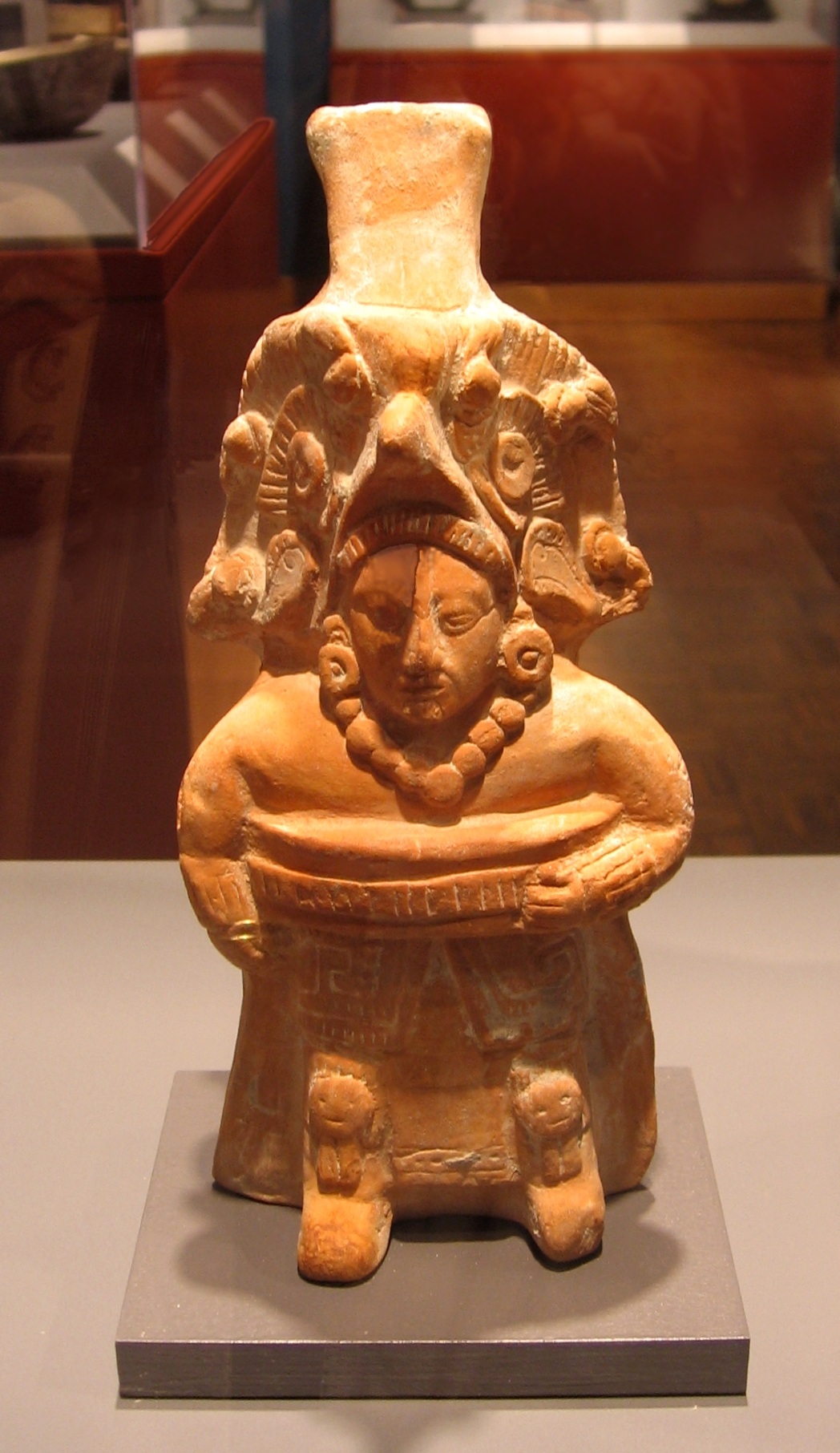
The yoke and kneepads identify this molded ceramic Maya figurine as a ballplayer. Like many of these Jaina Island style figurines, it also functions as a whistle. 600–900 CE.

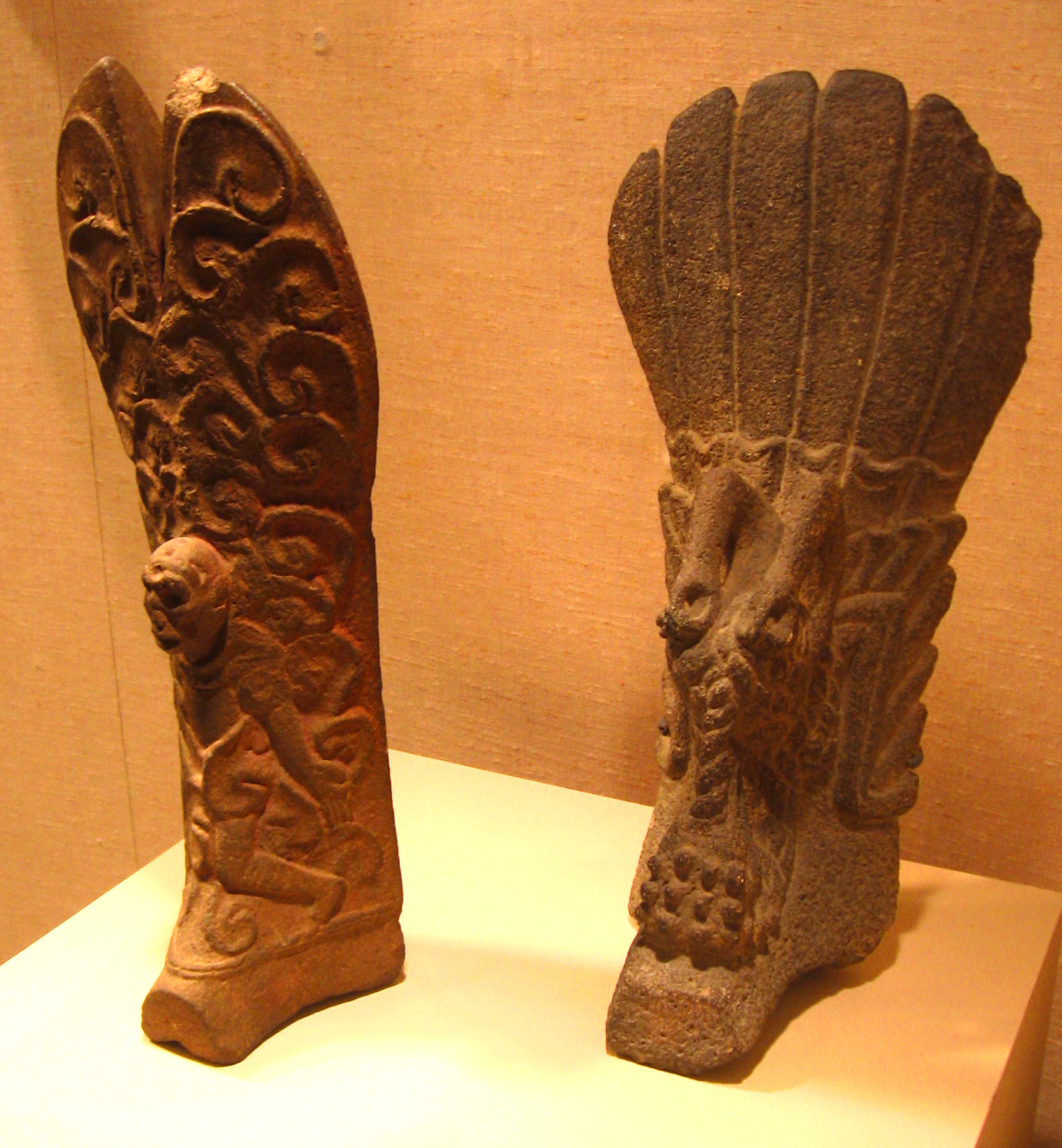
Two palmas from the Metropolitan Museum of Art, New York. These palmas were chest protectors worn in the Mesoamerican ballgame and come from Veracruz, Mexico, c.700–1000 CE. They are approximately 1½ feet (50 cm) high.

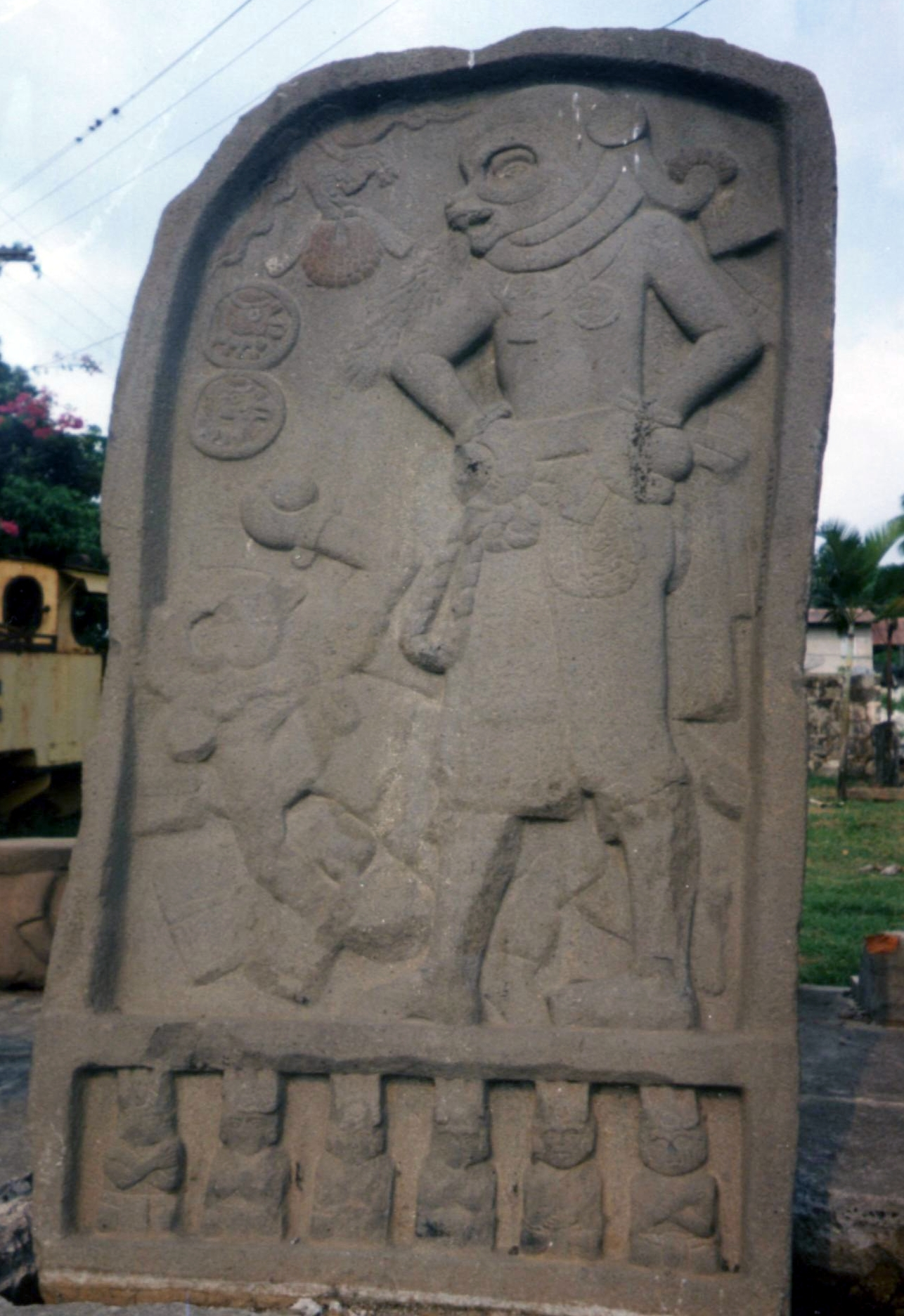
A stela from El Baúl in the Cotzumalhuapa Nuclear Zone, showing two ballplayers.

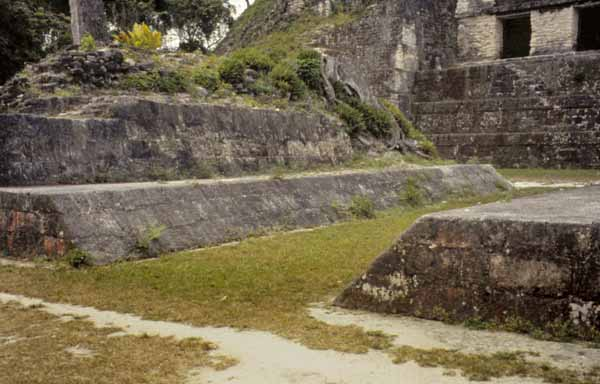
The ballcourt at Tikal, in the Petén Basin region of the Maya lowlands

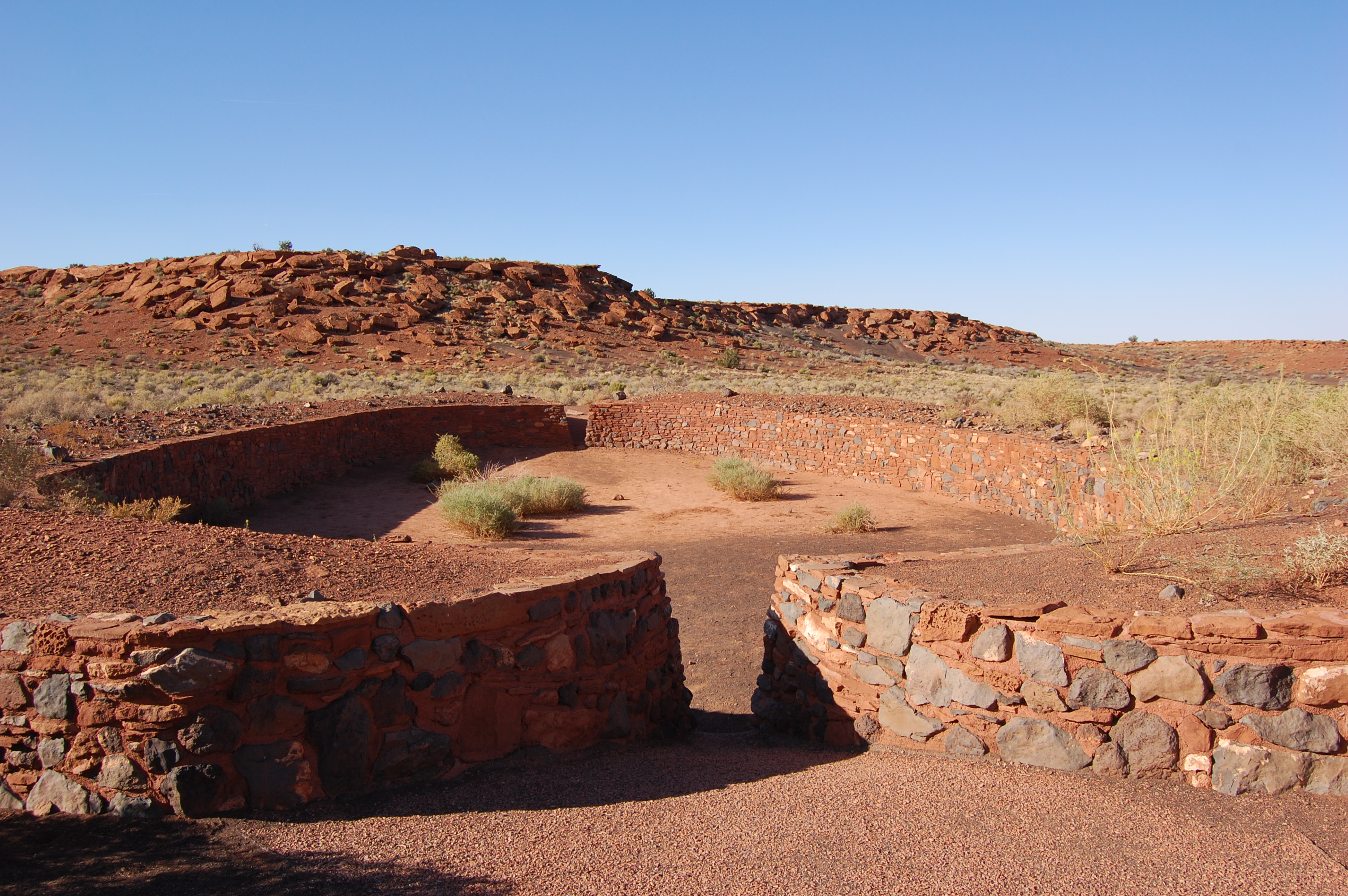
Ruins at Wupatki National Monument, Arizona. There is disagreement among archaeologists whether these structures in the American Southwest were used for ballgames, although the consensus appears that they were. There is further discussion concerning the extent that any Southwest ballgame is related to the Mesoamerican ballgame.

== Cultural aspects ==
=== Proxy for warfare ===
The Mesoamerican ballgame was a ritual deeply ingrained in Mesoamerican cultures and served purposes beyond that of a mere sporting event. Fray Juan de Torquemada, a 16th-century Spanish missionary and historian, tells that the Aztec emperor Axayacatl played Xihuitlemoc, the leader of Xochimilco, wagering his annual income against several Xochimilco chinampas. Ixtlilxochitl, a contemporary of Torquemada, relates that Topiltzin, the Toltec king, played against three rivals, with the winner ruling over the losers.

These examples and others are cited by many researchers who have made compelling arguments that the game served as a way to defuse or resolve conflicts without genuine warfare, to settle disputes through a ballgame instead of a battle. Over time, then, the ballgame's role would expand to include not only external mediation, but also the resolution of competition and conflict within the society as well.

This "boundary maintenance" or "conflict resolution" theory would also account for some of the irregular distribution of ballcourts. Overall, there appears to be a negative correlation between the degree of political centralization and the number of ballcourts at a site. For example, the Aztec Empire, with a strong centralized state and few external rivals, had relatively few ballcourts while Middle Classic Cantona, with 24 ballcourts, had many diverse cultures residing there under a relatively weak state.

Other scholars support these arguments by pointing to the warfare imagery often found at ballcourts:

- The southeast panel of the South Ballcourt at El Tajín shows the protagonist ballplayer being dressed in a warrior's garb.
- Captives are a prominent part of ballgame iconography. For example:

Several ceramic figurines show war captives holding game balls.
The ballcourt at Toniná was decorated with sculptures of bound captives.
A captive-within-the-ball motif is seen on the Hieroglyphic Stairs at Structure 33 in Yaxchilan and on Altar 8 at Tikal.

- The modern-day descendant of the ballgame, ulama, "until quite recently was connected with warfare and many reminders of that association remain".

=== Human sacrifice ===
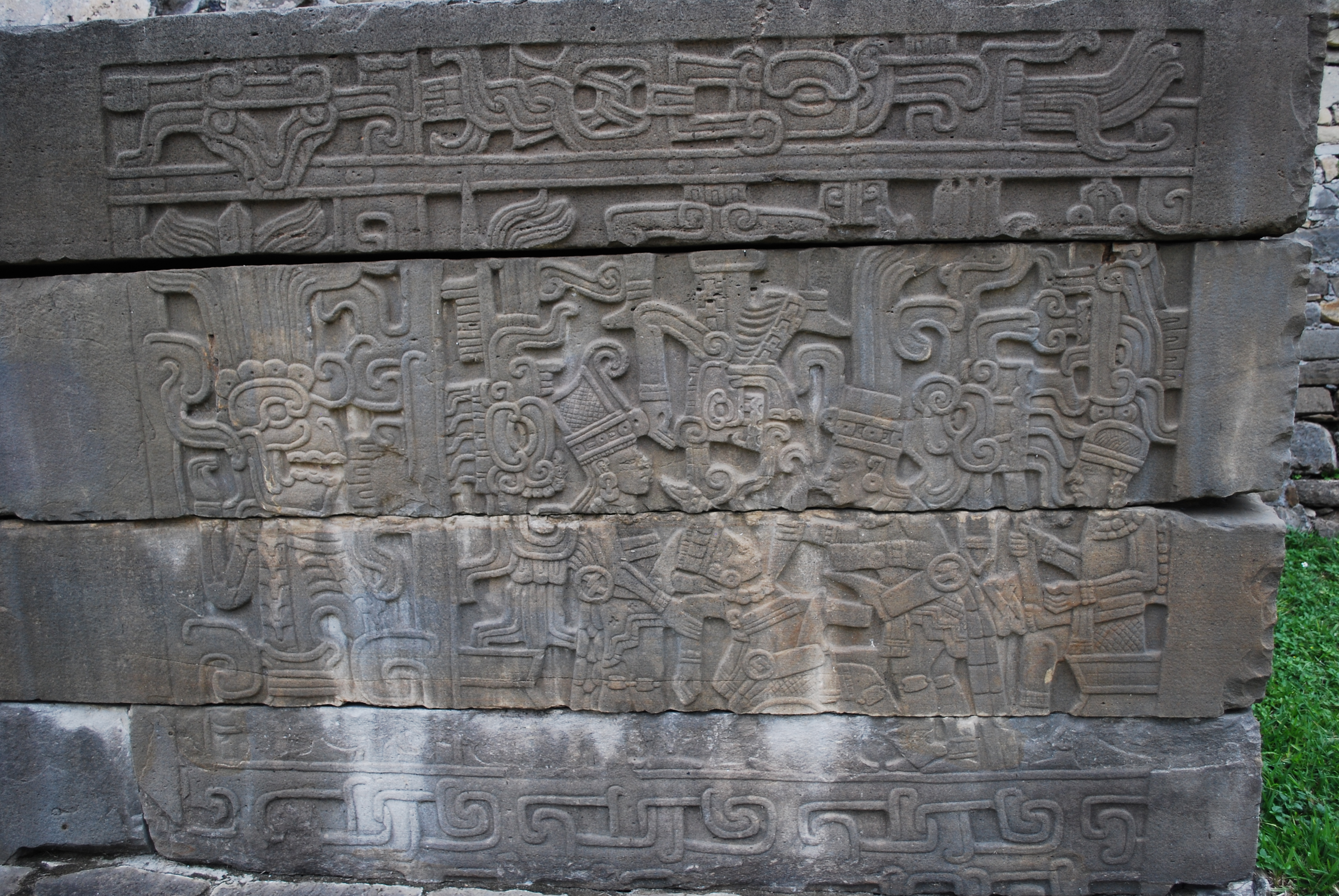
One of a series of murals from the South Ballcourt at El Tajín, showing the sacrifice of a ballplayer

The association between human sacrifice and the ballgame appears rather late in the archaeological record, no earlier than the Classic era. The association was particularly strong within the Classic Veracruz and the Maya cultures, where the most explicit depictions of human sacrifice can be seen on the ballcourt panels—for example at El Tajín (850–1100 CE) and at Chichen Itza (900–1200 CE)—as well as on the decapitated ballplayer stelae from the Classic Veracruz site of Aparicio (700–900 CE). The Postclassic Maya religious and quasi-historical narrative, the Popol Vuh, also links human sacrifice with the ballgame (see below).

Captives were often shown in Maya art, and it is assumed that these captives were sacrificed after losing a rigged ritual ballgame. Rather than nearly nude and sometimes battered captives, the ballcourts at El Tajín and Chichen Itza show the sacrifice of practiced ballplayers, perhaps the captain of a team. Decapitation is particularly associated with the ballgame—severed heads are featured in much Late Classic ballgame art and appear repeatedly in the Popol Vuh. There has been speculation that the heads and skulls were used as balls.

=== Symbolism ===
Little is known about the game's symbolic contents. Several themes recur in scholarly writing.

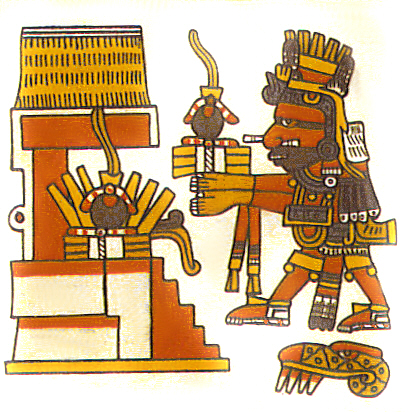
In this detail from the late 15th century Codex Borgia, the Aztec god Xiuhtecuhtli brings a rubber ball offering to a temple. The balls each hold a quetzal feather, part of the offering.

- Astronomy. The bouncing ball is thought to have represented the sun. The stone scoring rings are speculated to signify sunrise and sunset, or equinoxes.
- War. This is the most obvious symbolic aspect of the game (see also above, "Proxy for warfare"). Among the Mayas, the ball can represent the vanquished enemy, both in the late-Postclassic K'iche' kingdom (Popol Vuh), and in Classic kingdoms such as that of Yaxchilan.
- Fertility. Formative period ballplayer figurines—most likely females—often wear maize icons. At El Tajín, the ballplayer sacrifice ensures the renewal of pulque, an alcoholic maguey beverage.
- Cosmologic duality. The game is seen as a struggle between day and night, or a battle between life and the underworld. Courts were considered portals to the underworld and were built in key locations within the central ceremonial precincts. Playing ball engaged one in the maintenance of the cosmic order of the universe and the ritual regeneration of life.

==== Nahua ====
According to an important Nahua source, the Leyenda de los Soles, the Toltec king Huemac played ball against the Tlalocs, with precious stones and quetzal feathers at stake. Huemac won the game. When instead of precious stones and feathers, the rain deities offered Huemac their young maize ears and maize leaves, Huemac refused. As a consequence of this vanity, the Toltecs suffered a four-year drought. The same ballgame match, with its unfortunate aftermath, signified the beginning of the end of the Toltec reign.

==== Maya ====
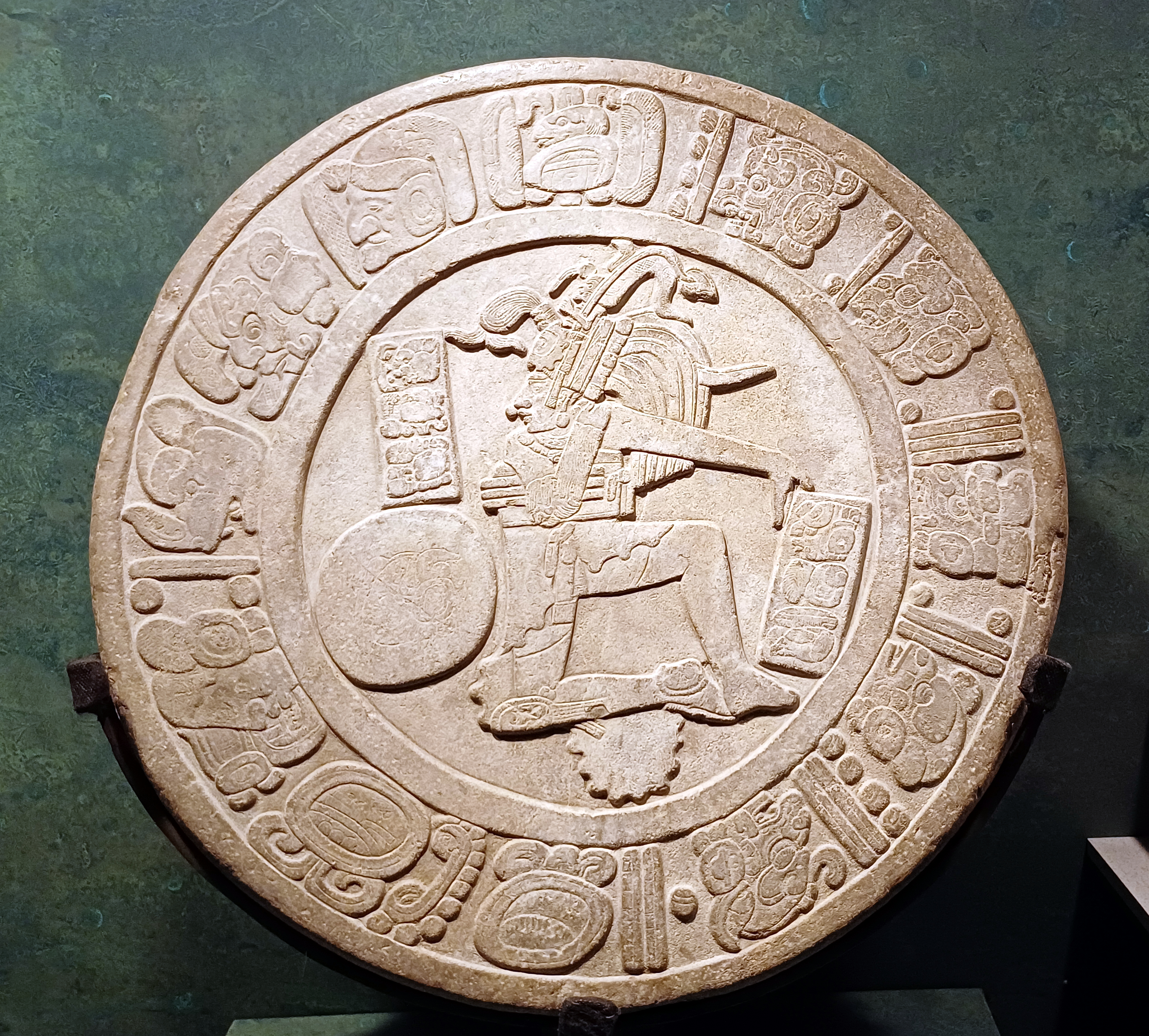
A ballcourt marker, from the Maya site of Chinkultic, dated to 591. The ball displays the finely incised portrait of a young deity.

The Maya Twin myth of the Popol Vuh establishes the importance of the game (referred to in Classic Maya as pitz) as a symbol for warfare intimately connected to the themes of fertility and death. The story begins with the Hero Twins' father, Hun Hunahpu, and uncle, Vucub Hunahpu, playing ball near the underworld, Xibalba. The lords of the underworld became annoyed with the noise from the ball playing and so the primary lords of Xibalba, One Death and Seven Death, sent owls to lure the brothers to the ballcourt of Xibalba, situated on the western edge of the underworld.

Despite the danger the brothers fall asleep and are captured and sacrificed by the lords of Xibalba and then buried in the ballcourt. Hun Hunahpu is decapitated and his head hung in a fruit tree, which bears the first calabash gourds. Hun Hunahpu's head spits into the hands of a passing goddess who conceives and bears the Hero Twins, Hunahpu and Xbalanque. The Hero Twins eventually find the ballgame equipment in their father's house and start playing, again to the annoyance of the Lords of Xibalba, who summon the twins to play the ballgame amidst trials and dangers.

In one notable episode, Hunahpu is decapitated by bats. His brother uses a squash as Hunahpu's substitute head until his real one, now used as a ball by the Lords, can be retrieved and placed back on Hunahpu's shoulders. The twins eventually go on to play the ballgame with the Lords of Xibalba, defeating them. However, the twins are unsuccessful in reviving their father, so they leave him buried in the ballcourt of Xibalba.

== The ballgame in Mesoamerican civilizations ==
=== Maya civilization ===
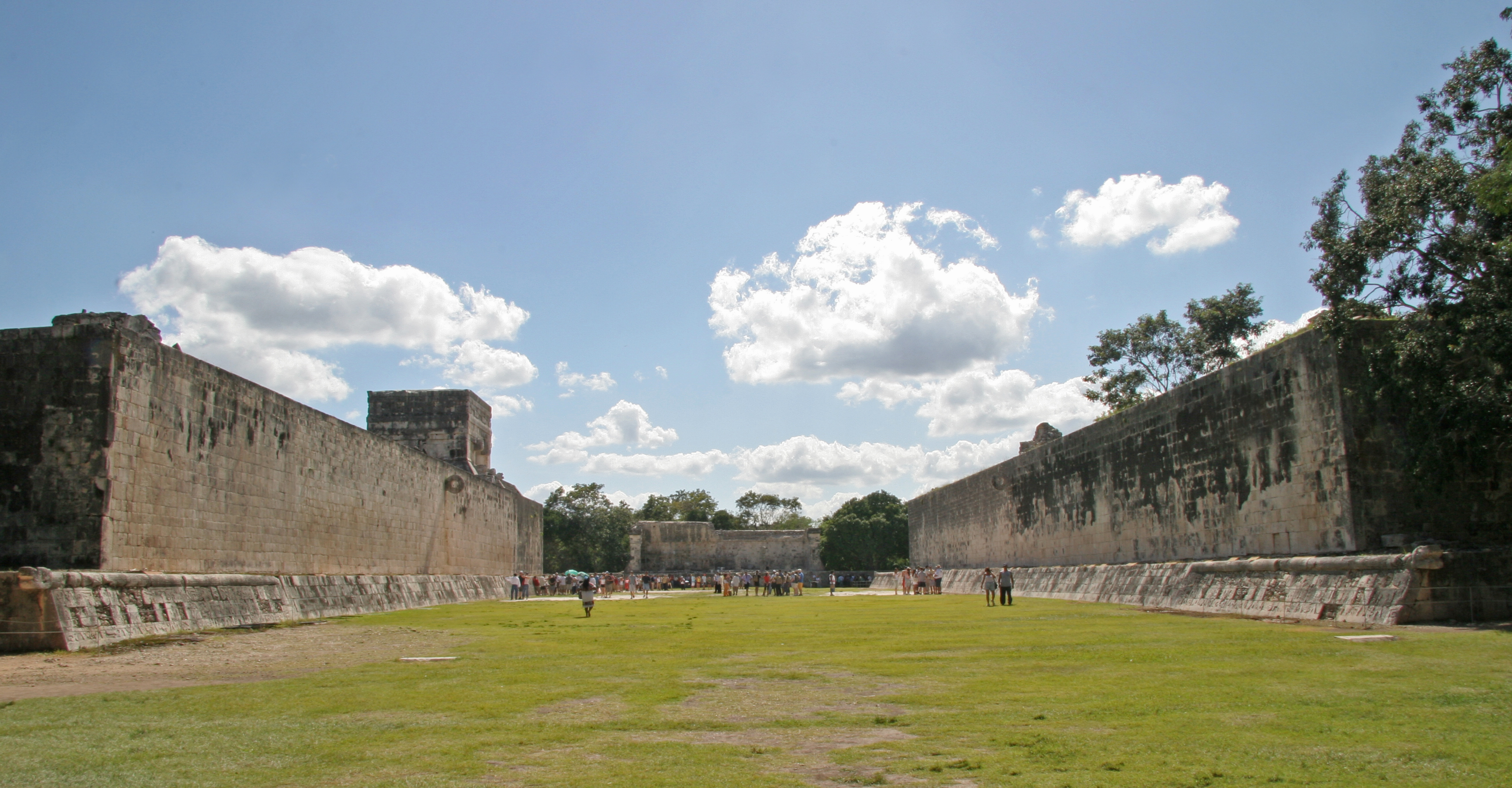
The Great Ballcourt at Chichen Itza

In Maya Ballgame, the Hero Twins myth links ballcourts with death and its overcoming. The ballcourt becomes a place of transition, a liminal stage between life and death. The ballcourt markers along the centerline of the Classic playing field depicted ritual and mythical scenes of the ballgame, often bordered by a quatrefoil that marked a portal into another world. The Twins themselves, however, are usually absent from Classic ballgame scenes, with the Classic forerunner of Vucub Caquix of the Copán ballcourt, holding the severed arm of Hunahpu, as an important exception.

=== Teotihuacan ===
No ballcourt has yet been identified at Teotihuacan, making it by far the largest Classic era site without one. Therefore, 2022 investigations of Gazzola and Gómez identify what may have been a site for a conventional soccer field in the area known as La Ciudadela. In fact, the ballgame seems to have been nearly forsaken not only in Teotihuacan, but in areas such as Matacapan or Tikal that were under Teotihuacano influence.

Despite the lack of a ballcourt, ballgames were not unknown there. The murals of the Tepantitla compound at Teotihuacan show a number of small scenes that seem to portray various types of ballgames, including:

- A two-player game in an open-ended masonry ballcourt. (See third picture below.)
- Teams using sticks on an open field whose end zones are marked by stone monuments.
- Separate renditions of single players. (See first two details below.)
- The discovery of a ring fragment similar to others found in Mesoamerica in the La Ventilla area.
- The discovery of an artifact known as the La Ventilla Stele which may have been a ballcourt marker. A possible depiction of it can be found in the murals of Tepantitla (see fourth picture below)

It has been hypothesized that, for reasons as yet unknown, the stick-game eclipsed the hip-ball game at Teotihuacan and at Teotihuacan-influenced cities, and only after the fall of Teotihuacan did the hip-ball game reassert itself.

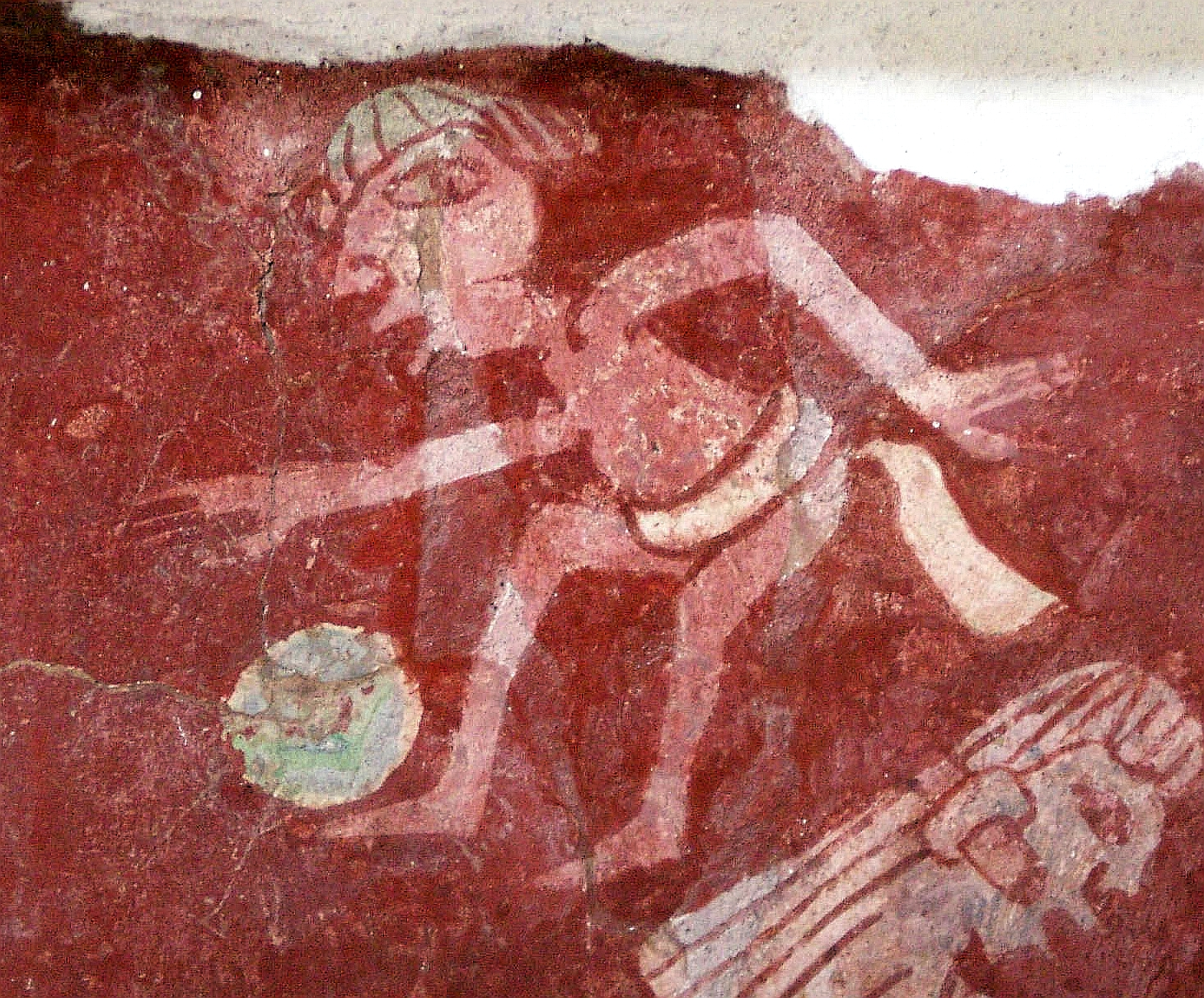
Ballplayer painting from the Tepantitla murals.

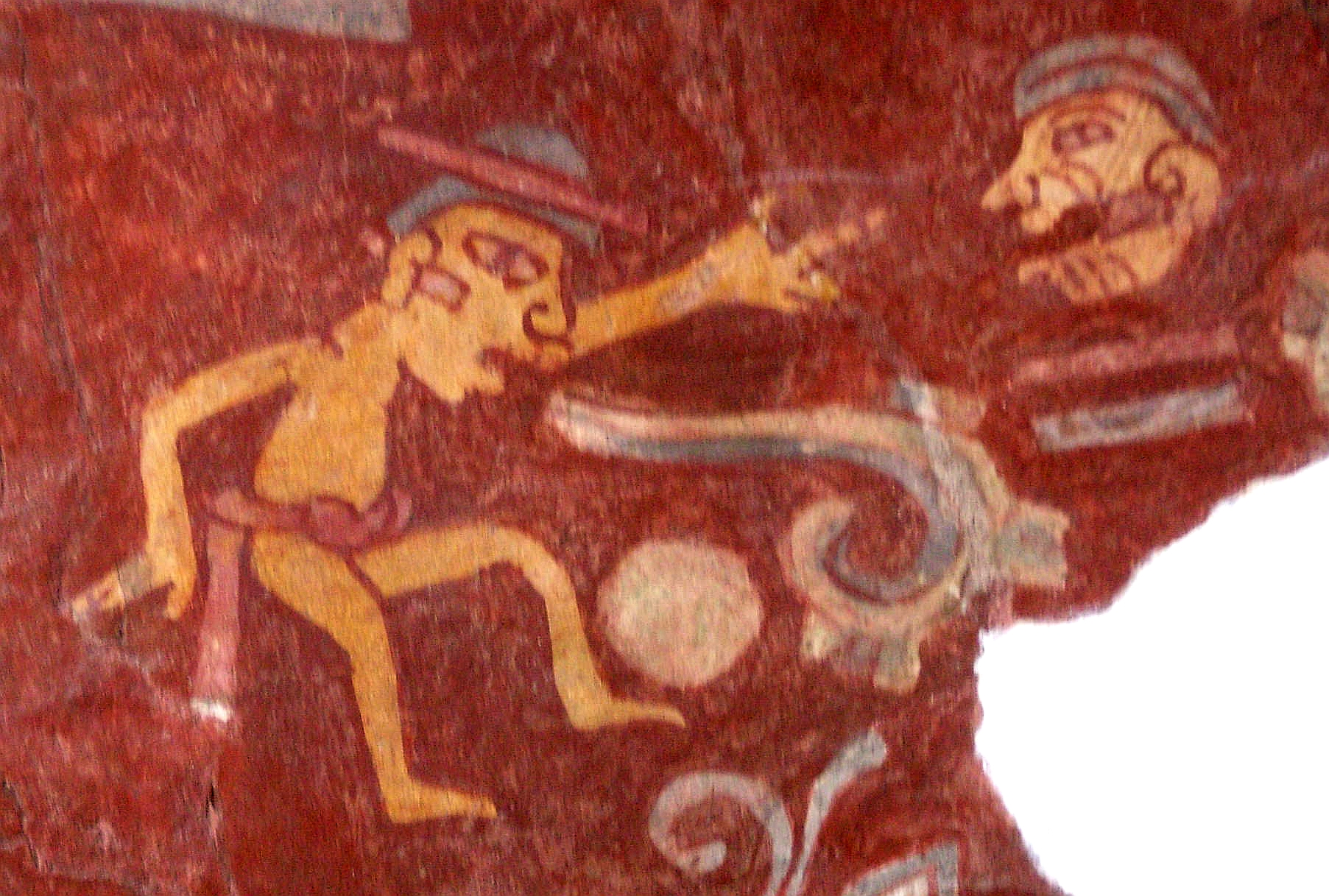
Ballplayer painting from the Tepantitla, Teotihuacan murals. Note the speech scroll issuing from the player's mouth.

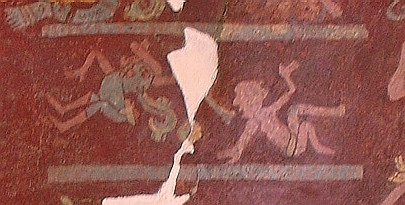
Detail of a Tepantitla mural showing a hip-ball game on an open-ended ballcourt, represented by the parallel horizontal lines.

=== Aztec ===
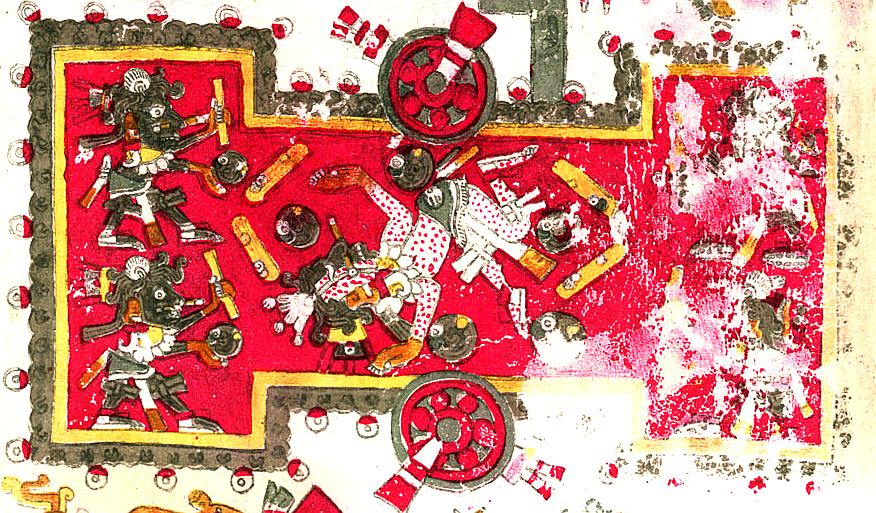
An I-shaped ballcourt with players and balls depicted in the Codex Borgia Folio 45. Note that the four players are all holding batons, perhaps indicating that they are playing a type of racquet- or stick-ball.

The Aztec version of the ballgame is called ōllamalīztli (sometimes spelled ullamaliztli) which is derived from the word ōlli "rubber" and the verb ōllama "to play ball". The ball itself was called ōllamaloni and the ballcourt was called a tlachtli. In the Aztec capital Tenochtitlan the largest ballcourt was called Teotlachco ("in the holy ballcourt")—here several important rituals would take place on the festivals of the month Panquetzalitzli, including the sacrifice of four war captives to the honor of Huitzilopochtli and his herald Paynal.

For the Aztecs, the playing of the ballgame also had religious significance, but where the 16th-century K´iche´ Maya saw the game as a battle between the lords of the underworld and their earthly adversaries, their Aztec contemporaries may have seen it as a battle of the sun, personified by Huitzilopochtli, against the forces of night, led by the moon and the stars, and represented by the goddess Coyolxauhqui and Coatlicue's sons the 400 Huitznahuah. But apart from holding important ritual and mythical meaning, the ballgame for the Aztecs was a sport and a pastime played for fun, although in general, the Aztec game was a prerogative of the nobles.

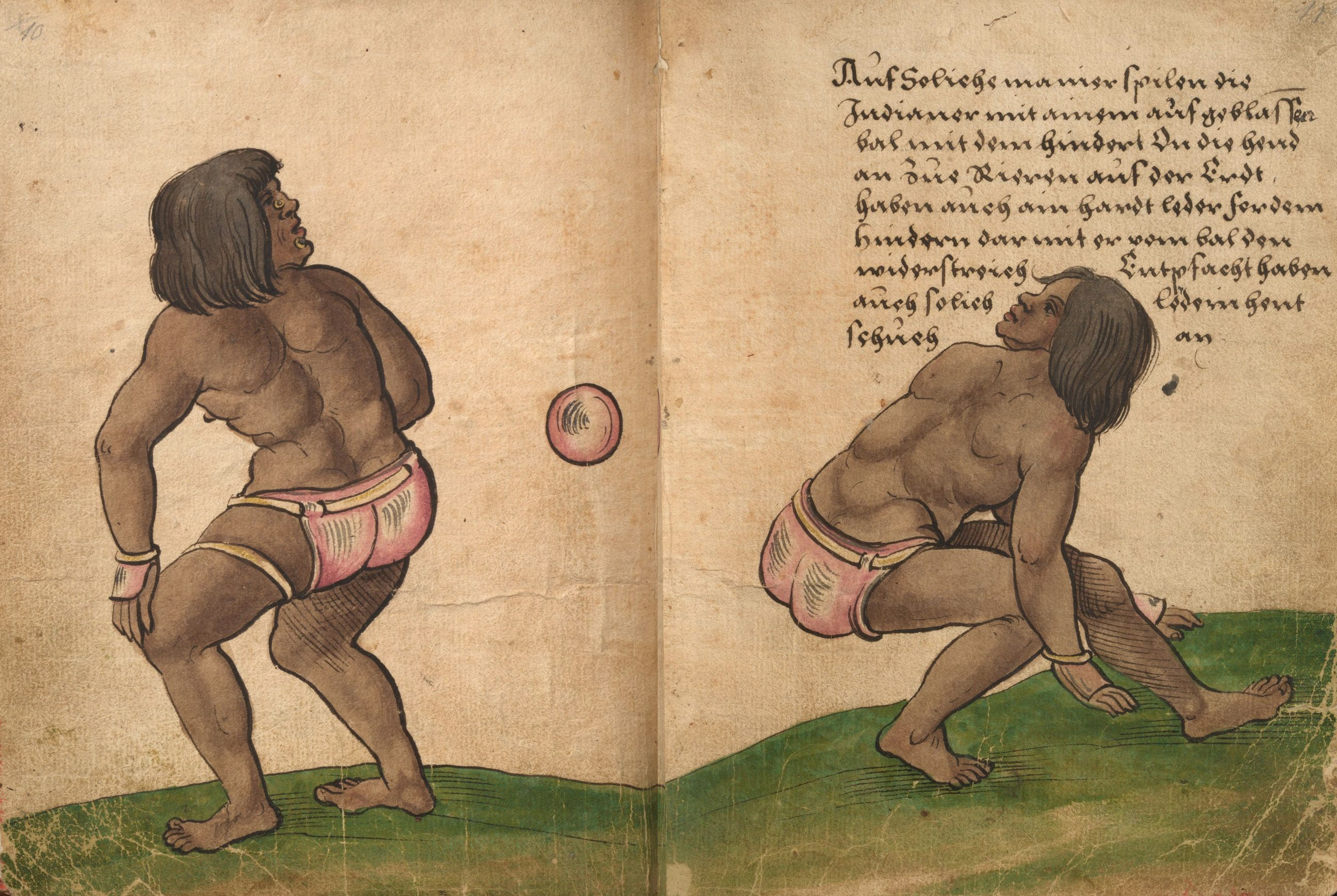
Aztec ōllamalīztli players performing for Charles V in Spain, drawn by Christoph Weiditz in 1528.

Young Aztecs would be taught ballplaying in the calmecac school—and those who were most proficient might become so famous that they could play professionally. Games would frequently be staged in the different city wards and markets—often accompanied by large-scale betting. According to Diego Durán, "these wretches ... sold their children in order to bet and even staked themselves and became slaves".

Since the rubber tree Castilla elastica was not found in the highlands of the Aztec Empire, the Aztecs generally received balls and rubber as tribute from the lowland areas where it was grown. The Codex Mendoza gives a figure of 16,000 lumps of raw rubber being imported to Tenochtitlan from the southern provinces every six months, although not all of it was used for making balls.

In 1528, soon after the Spanish conquest, Cortés sent a troupe of ōllamanime (ballplayers) to Spain to perform for Charles V where they were drawn by the German Christoph Weiditz. Besides the fascination with their exotic visitors, the Europeans were amazed by the bouncing rubber balls.

=== Pacific coast ===
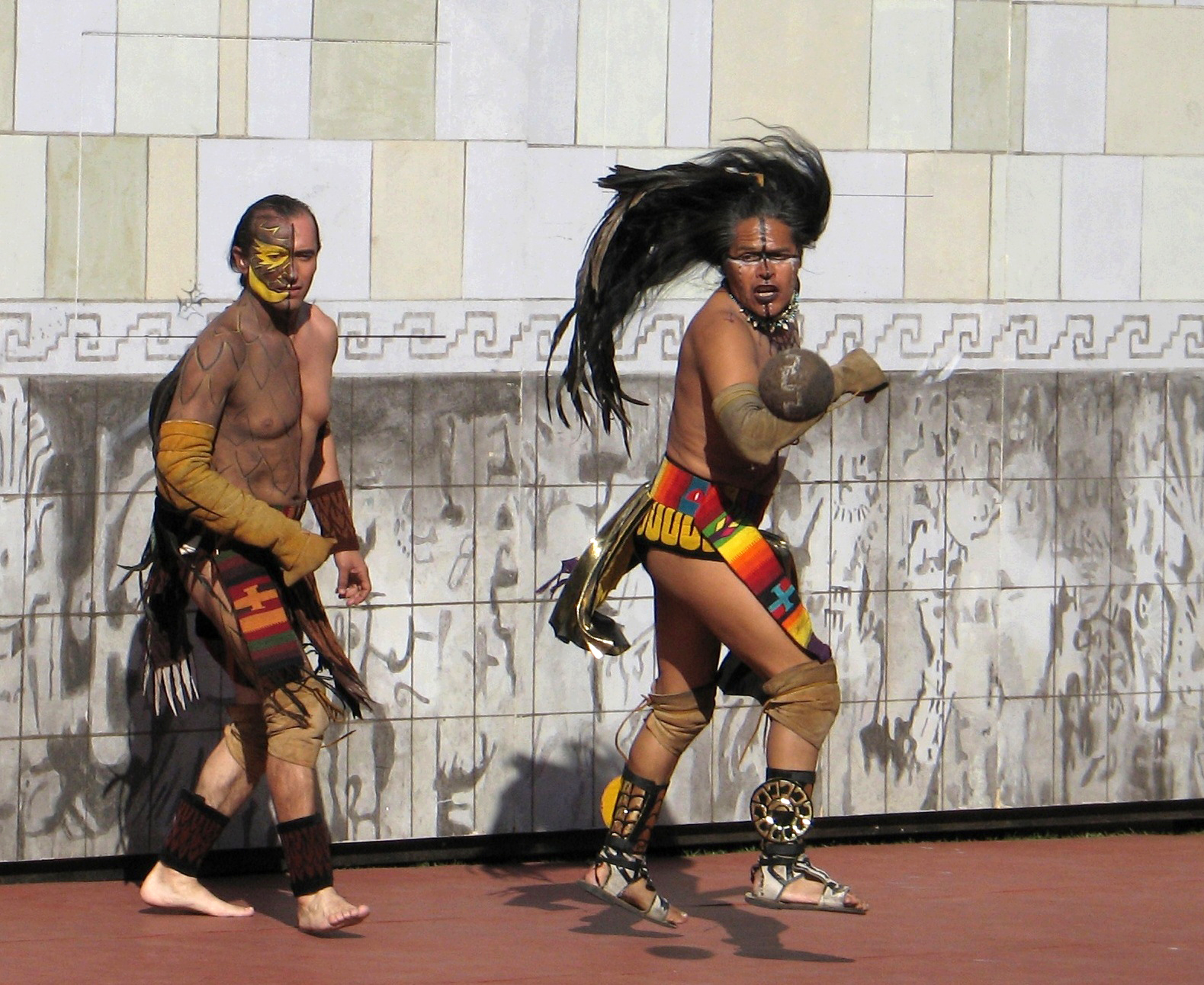
Pok-ta-pok players in action

Ballcourts, monuments with ballgame imagery and ballgame paraphernalia have been excavated at sites along the Pacific coast of Guatemala and El Salvador including the Cotzumalhuapa nuclear zone sites of Bilbao and El Baúl and sites right at the southeast periphery of the Mesoamerican region such as Quelepa.

=== Caribbean ===
Batey, a ball game played on many Caribbean islands in the West Indies, has been proposed as a descendant of the Mesoamerican ballgame, perhaps through the Maya.

== In popular culture ==
- Doraemon: Nobita and the Legend of the Sun King, a 1999 animated film by Toho.
- The Road to El Dorado, a 2000 animated film by Dreamworks Pictures.
- Elena of Avalor, a 2016 animated TV series by the Disney Channel.
- Futurama, season 9's first episode, Bender wins the game in his Mexican ancestors' hometown and also wins the honor of sacrifice upon the altar of the Ancients.
- Black Panther: Wakanda Forever, a group of young Talokans are seen playing the sport underwater.
- Magic: The Gathering features a card called 'Contested Game Ball', which depicts the ball and stone goals.
- Blood In Blood Out, Magic references the Aztec ballcourt with the phrase "Here it's estilo Toluca. That's the Aztec ball court. Where you lose ... you die," as a metaphor for the unforgiving world of gang life.
- Fallen London, the ballcourt makes an appearance towards the end of one of the storylines "Bag A Legend."

== Cited sources ==
- Day, Jane Stevenson (2001). "Performing on the Court". In E. Michael Whittington (ed.). The Sport of Life and Death: The Mesoamerican Ballgame (Published in conjunction with an exhibition of the same name organized by the Mint Museum of Art, Charlotte, NC. ed.). New York: Thames & Hudson. pp. 65–77. ISBN 978-0-500-05108-5. OCLC 49029226.
- Garza Camino, Mercedes de la; Ana Luisa Izquierdo (1980). "El Ullamaliztli en el Siglo XVI". Estudios de Cultura Náhuatl (in Spanish). 14: 315–333. ISSN 0071-1675.
- Cohodas, Marvin (1991). "Ballgame imagery of the Maya Lowlands: History and Iconography". In Vernon Scarborough; David R. Wilcox (eds.). The Mesoamerican Ballgame. Tucson: University of Arizona Press. ISBN 978-0-8165-1360-4. OCLC 51873028.
- Diehl, Richard (2004). The Olmecs: America's First Civilization. Ancient peoples and places series. London: Thames & Hudson. ISBN 978-0-500-02119-4. OCLC 56746987.
- Filloy Nadal, Laura (2001). "Rubber and Rubber Balls in Mesoamerica". In E. Michael Whittington (ed.). The Sport of Life and Death: The Mesoamerican Ballgame (Published in conjunction with an exhibition of the same name organized by the Mint Museum of Art, Charlotte, NC. ed.). New York: Thames & Hudson. pp. 20–31. ISBN 978-0-500-05108-5. OCLC 49029226.
- Gillespie, Susan D. (1991). "Ballgames and Boundaries". In Vernon Scarborough; David R. Wilcox (eds.). The Mesoamerican Ballgame. Tucson: University of Arizona Press. pp. 317–345. ISBN 978-0-8165-1360-4. OCLC 51873028.
- Ortíz C., Ponciano; María del Carmen Rodríguez (1999). "Olmec Ritual Behavior at El Manatí: A Sacred Space" (PDF). In David C. Grove; Rosemary A. Joyce (eds.). Social Patterns in Pre-Classic Mesoamerica: a symposium at Dumbarton Oaks, 9 and 10 October 1993 (Dumbarton Oaks etexts ed.). Washington, D.C.: Dumbarton Oaks Research Library and Collection. pp. 225–254. ISBN 978-0-88402-252-7. OCLC 39229716. Archived from the original (PDF) on February 5, 2009.
- Quirarte, Jacinto (1977). "The Ballcourt in Mesoamerica: Its Architectural Development". In Alan Cordy-Collins; Jean Stern (eds.). Pre-Columbian Art History. Palo Alto, California: Peek Publications. pp. 191–212. ISBN 978-0-917962-41-7.
- Santley, Robert M.; Berman, Michael J.; Alexander, Rami T. (1991). "The Politicization of the Mesoamerican Ballgame and Its Implications for the Interpretation of the Distribution of Ballcourts in Central Mexico". In Vernon Scarborough; David R. Wilcox (eds.). The Mesoamerican Ballgame. Tucson: University of Arizona Press. ISBN 978-0-8165-1180-8. OCLC 22765562.
- Schele, Linda; Miller, Mary Ellen (1986). The Blood of Kings: Dynasty and Ritual in Maya Art. Fort Worth, Texas: Kimball Art Museum.
- Shelton, Anthony A. (2003). "The Aztec Theatre State and the Dramatization of War". In Tim Cornell; Thomas B. Allen (eds.). War and Games. New York: Boydell Press. ISBN 978-0-85115-870-9.
- Taladoire, Eric (2001). "The Architectural Background of the Pre-Hispanic Ballgame". The Sport of Life and Death: The Mesoamerican Ballgame (Published in conjunction with an exhibition of the same name organized by the Mint Museum of Art, Charlotte, NC ed.). New York: Thames & Hudson. pp. 97–115. ISBN 978-0-500-05108-5. OCLC 49029226.
- Taladoire, Eric; Colsenet, Benoit (1991). "'Bois Ton Sang, Beaumanior':The Political and Conflictual Aspects of the Ballgame in the Northern Chiapas Area". In Vernon Scarborough; David R. Wilcox (eds.). The Mesoamerican Ballgame. Tucson: University of Arizona Press. ISBN 978-0-8165-1180-8. OCLC 22765562.
- Uriarte, María Teresa, ed. (1992). El juego de pelota en Mesoamérica: raíces y supervivencia (in Spanish). México D.F.: SigloXXI Editores and Casa de Cultura, Gobierno del Estado de Sinaloa. ISBN 978-968-23-1837-5.
- Wilkerson, S. Jeffrey K. (1991). "Then They Were Sacrificed: The Ritual Ballgame of Northeastern Mesoamerica Through Time and Space". In Vernon Scarborough; David R. Wilcox (eds.). The Mesoamerican Ballgame. Tucson: University of Arizona Press. ISBN 978-0-8165-1180-8. OCLC 22765562.
