= El Baúl =

Pre-Columbian archaeological site in Guatemala

Coordinates: 14.3803°N 91.0108°W

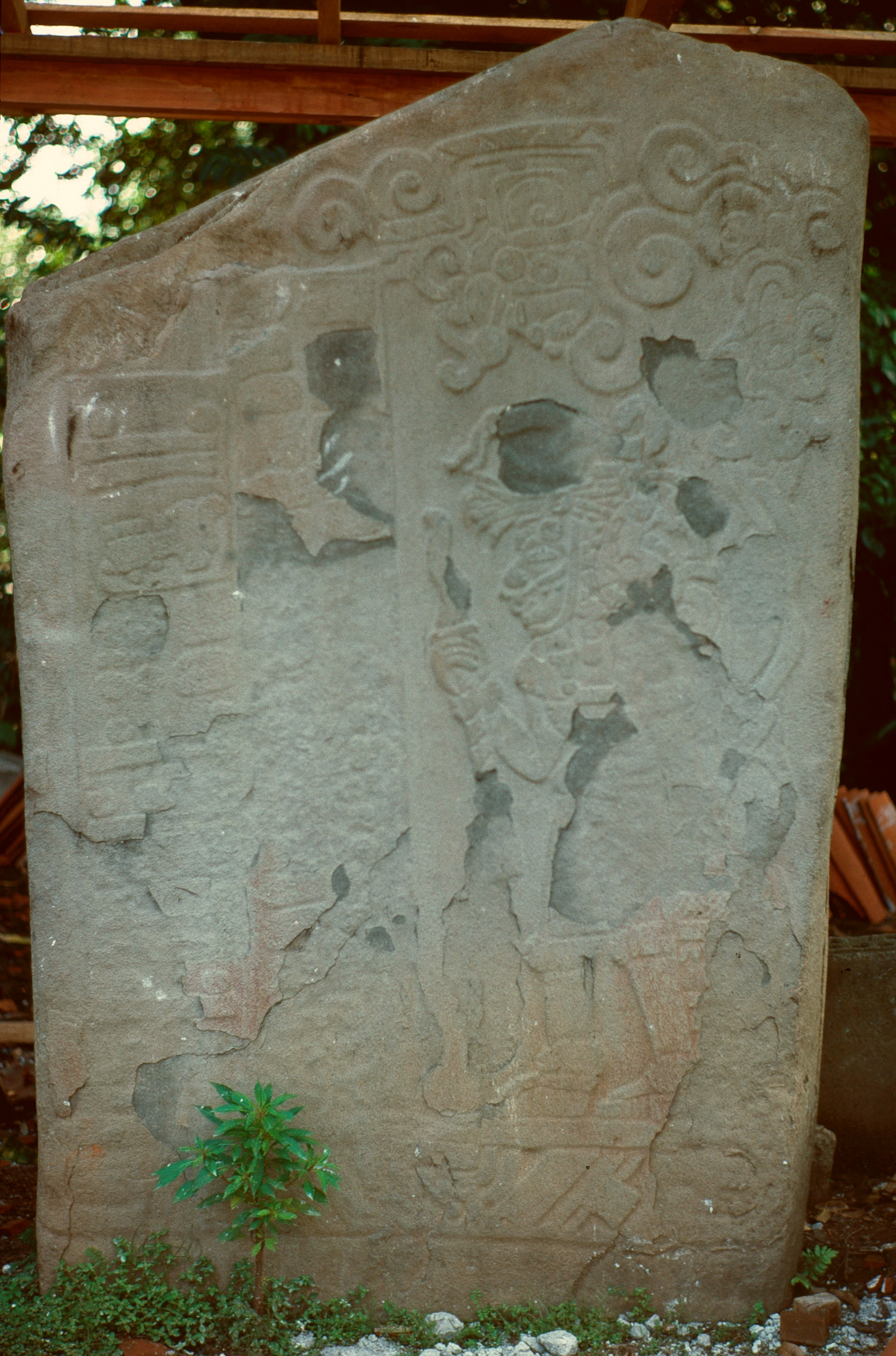
Stela 1, showing one of the earliest Long Count dates yet discovered, March 6, 37 CE (7.19.15.7.12).

El Baúl (Note: /bɑːˈuːl/ bah-OOL; Spanish pronunciation: [baˈul]) is a Pre-Columbian archaeological site in present-day Escuintla Department, Guatemala. El Baúl, along with the sites of Bilbao and El Castillo, is part of the Cotzumalhuapa Archaeological Zone. It was occupied during the prehistoric Formative stage of the Americas.

== Site ==
The El Baúl acropolis is located 4 kilometres (2.5 mi) north of Santa Lucía Cotzumalguapa, 550 metres (1,800 ft) above sea level, 50 kilometres (31 mi) from the Pacific Ocean. Its southern acropolis complex was destroyed in 1997 by urban development and the main groups are now covered by sugar cane fields. The ballcourt is located 500 metres (1,600 ft) north of the acropolis with several residential groups in between. It is united by two causeways. The site's geologic context is volcanic; it is located just south of an active stratovolcano, Fuego volcano.

The site contains monumental architecture in its acropolis as well as a probable sweatbath and obsidian workshops. Analysis of these deposits is particularly important for the study of the ancient obsidian industry. The P31 stratigraphic pit continued below these deposits to a depth of 3.78 metres (12.4 ft), revealing volcanic ash layers derived from the adjacent Fuego volcano. Obsidian debitage continued below these ash layers, suggesting that the area was used as a refuse deposit for a prolonged period.

The largest causeway is 2.5 kilometres (1.6 mi) long and ranges from 11 to 14 metres (36 to 46 ft) wide, joining the acropoleis of Bilbao and El Baúl. Before entering El Baúl, the causeway ran across a large bridge over the Santiago River gorge. The foundation walls of the bridge, which most probably sustained a wooden structure, are still visible along a 330-metre (1,080 ft) span of the river course. An excavation carried out on the western side of the river gorge revealed two constructional stages for the causeway at this location, both of which date to the Late Classic period. Many monumental sculptures have been found along the causeways.

The following table summarizes the primary monumental sculptures, chronological periods, and iconographic features documented across the El Baúl sector of Cotzumalhuapa:

Key monumental sculptures and inscriptions at El Baúl
Monument	Chronological period	Material and dimensions	Iconographic features and inscriptions	Archaeological context
Stela 1	Late Formative / Protoclassic (c. AD 37)	Basalt slab (2.2 m (7.2 ft) tall)	Early Long Count date inscription (7.19.15.7.12); depicts a standing ruler holding a scepter.	Erected near the main acropolis; key evidence for early writing on the Pacific Slope.
Monument 3	Late Classic (AD 600–900)	Carved volcanic basalt boulder	Colossal relief head featuring central Mexican glyphic conventions and circular earspools.	Positioned along the causeway system connecting El Baúl to Bilbao.
Monument 27	Late Classic (AD 600–900)	Basalt relief panel	Depicts a Cotzumalhuapa ballplayer wearing a protective yoke and speech scroll elements.	Associated with the ballcourt complex located 500 metres (1,600 ft) north of the acropolis.

== See also ==
- Bilbao (Mesoamerican site)
