= Cotzumalhuapa =

Archaeological culture in Guatemala

Coordinates: 14°22′53″N 91°01′07″W

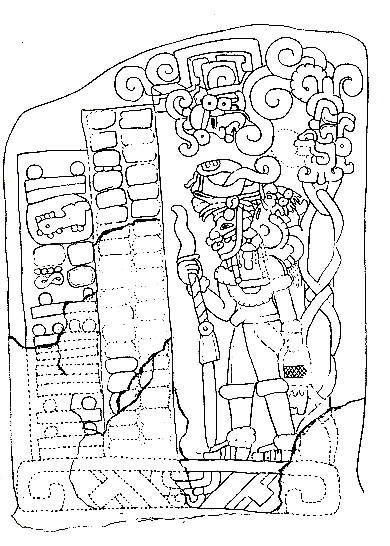
Stela 1, from El Baúl, with the Mesoamerican Long Count calendar date of 7.19.15.7.12.

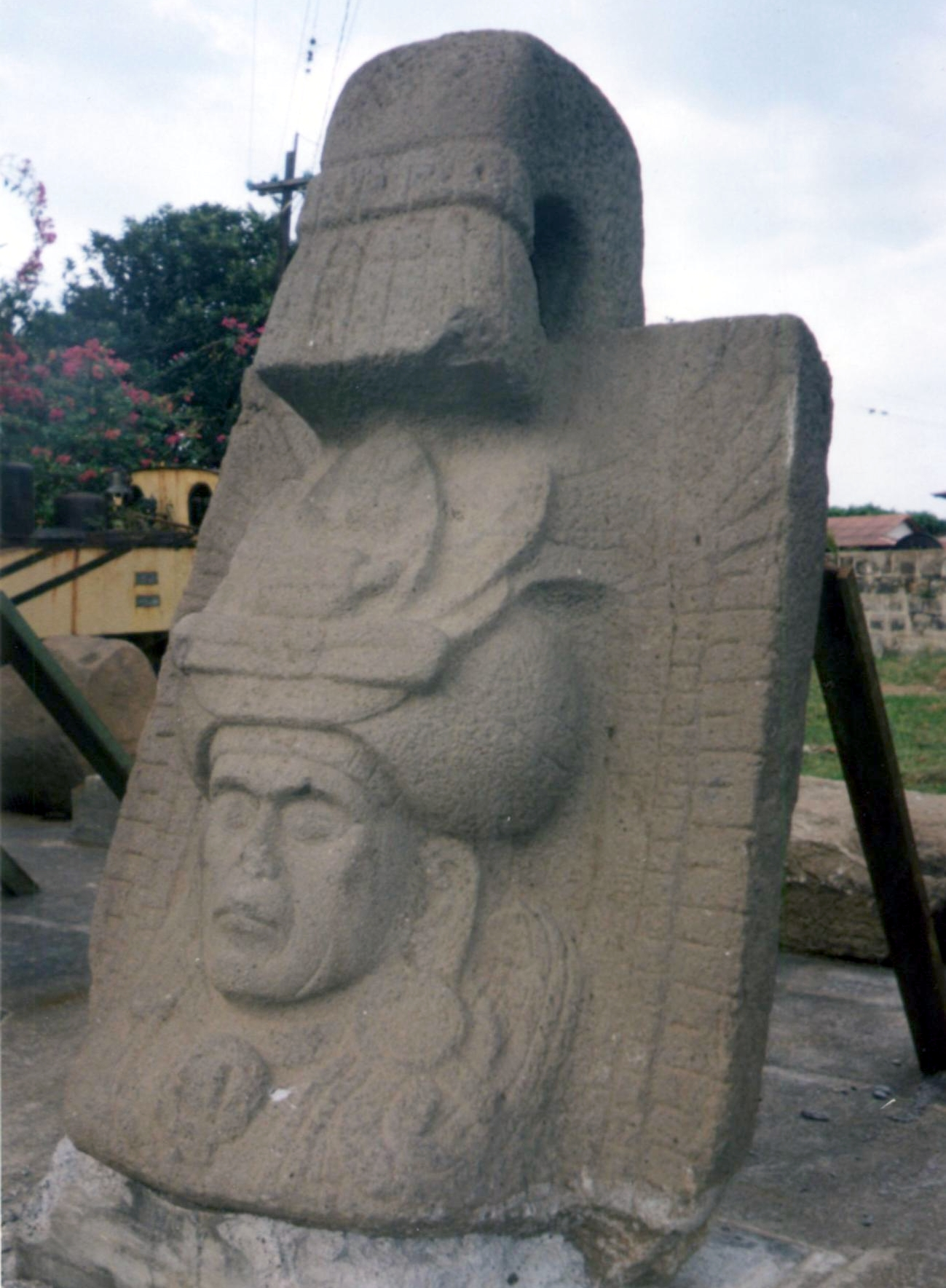
A sculpture from El Baúl

The Cotzumalhuapa archaeological culture is from the piedmont area of the Escuintla Department, Guatemala. The Cotzumalhuapa archaeological zone is near the town of Santa Lucía Cotzumalguapa (the city is spelled with a g — Cotzumalguapa — and the culture tends to be spelled with an h — Cotzumalhuapa).

The Cotzumalhuapa archaeological zone is a pre-Columbian Maya archaeological zone dating mainly to the Late Classic period in Mesoamerican chronology, although it was occupied since the Middle Preclassic period and there is evidence of a major development during the Late Preclassic period.

The famous Stela 1 from El Baúl has one of the earliest inscriptions in Mesoamerica, with the earliest legible hieroglyphic Long Count date in Guatemala equaling 37 CE.

== Introduction ==
Cotzumalhuapa is located on the Pacific piedmont of southern Guatemala, in the Escuintla Department, on the outskirts of modern Santa Lucia Cotzumalguapa. During the Late Classic period, Cotzumalhuapa was a major city that extended more than 10 square kilometres (3.9 sq mi). It encompassing three major compounds, known as El Baúl, Bilbao, and El Castillo, with extensive settlements between and around them.

The Cotzumalhuapa Zone contains not only the 3 main sites, but the minor site of Golón as well as connecting stone-paved causeways and bridges. Its main structures were made of earthen filling and carefully chosen stones. There have been found more than 200 structures and 187 sculptured monuments here dating from Pre-Classic (see Stela 1, to right, dated at 37 CE) to the Late Classic (600-1000 CE). In the Late Classic phase, El Baúl was one of the most important Pacific coast sites.

== Artefacts ==
A corpus of more than 200 monumental sculptures are known from the city and from neighboring sites that include Palo Verde, Aguna, Palo Gordo, and others. Examples of the Cotzumalhuapa sculptural style are found across the Pacific Coast and highlands of Guatemala, and into El Salvador, where Cara Sucia marks the southeastern limit of the Cotzumalhuapa zone.

== Culture ==
The inhabitants of Cotzumalhuapa developed an original artistic style and a writing system of their own, which remains undeciphered. Hieroglyphic signs usually are inscribed in circular cartouches, but they may also acquire complex animated forms. The number of known inscriptions is quite small.

Cotzumalhuapa people produced a large corpus of monumental sculptures. These include rock carvings, stelae, altars, colossal heads, and sculptures, both free-standing and as a component of the architecture (e. g. carved stairs, pillars, and pavement stones). There are also numerous portable sculptures.

Characteristic of the Cotzumalguapa style is an extraordinary degree of realism in the representation of human figures. The Cotzumalhuapa style is characterized by its treatment of human figures, which display strong and highly individualized facial features combined with flat but well-proportioned bodies, often depicted in dynamic poses. In many cases, these individuals participate in complex scenes, where they interact with other human characters or with supernatural beings. Sacrificial scenes are frequent.

Distinctive elements of the Cotzumalguapa style include speech scrolls shaped as vines with a variety of flowers and fruits.

== Influence ==
Cotzumalhuapa was most likely the seat of a powerful state, which exerted political control over a vast region of the Pacific coast. The diffusion of the sculptural style provides a measure of the geographic extension of Cotzumalguapa influence. The style is found along a 200 kilometer stretch of the Pacific coast, from the modern border between Guatemala and El Salvador to the Suchitepéquez Department. It also had strong presence in some regions of the Central and Eastern Highlands, particularly in the region of Antigua Guatemala. Some elements of the style are perceptible in sculptures from various sites located in Chimaltenango in the Central Highlands, the western Pacific Coastal area, and the Motagua River valley.

== Footnotes ==
=== References ===
- Chinchilla Mazariegos, Oswaldo (2001), "Cumalhuapa." In The Oxford Encyclopedia of Mesoamerican Cultures. : Oxford University Press.
- Chinchilla Mazariegos, Oswaldo (2000), "Cotzumalhuapa style" in Evans, Susan, Archaeology of Ancient Mexico and Central America, Taylor & Francis.
- Parsons, Lee 1969 "The Pacific Coast Cotzumalhuapa Region and Middle American Culture History" In: Verhandlungen des XXXVIII: internationalen Amerikanistenkongresses, München: K. Renner.
- Cotzumalhuapa Archaeology Project Article at Museo Popul Vuh, Guatemala City.
