= Vernon L. Scarborough =

American anthropologist and archaeologist

Vernon Lee Scarborough
- Born: June 25, 1950 (age 76)
- Citizenship: United States
- Education: University of Oregon (B.S. 1973); Southern Methodist University (PhD 1980)
- Known for: Ancient hydrological and water management systems Pre-Columbian settlement patterns & political economies Maya site archaeology in Belize and the Petén
- Scientific career
- Fields: anthropology, archaeology
- Workplaces: UT El Paso (1982-1987); University of Cincinnati (1988–)
- Thesis: The Settlement System in a Late Preclassic Maya Community: Cerros, Northern Belize (1980)
- Doctoral advisor: David A. Freidel

Vernon Lee Scarborough (born June 25, 1950) is an American academic anthropologist and archaeologist, known for his research and publications on settlement, land use and water management practices of archaic and Pre-industrial society.

== Education ==
As an undergraduate Scarborough attended the University of Oregon in Eugene, Oregon, completing his B.S. in anthropology in 1973. His doctorate studies were undertaken at Southern Methodist University in Dallas, where he was awarded his PhD in 1980.

== Career ==
As of 2011 Scarborough is a Distinguished Research Professor and Charles P. Taft Professor in the Department of Anthropology at the McMicken College of Arts and Sciences, University of Cincinnati in Ohio, USA. Scarborough's research and fieldwork on hydrology and water management systems has been conducted primarily among pre-Columbian Maya civilization sites in the Maya lowlands of Guatemala and Belize, where since 1992 he has co-directed and instructed on a number of seasonal archaeology programmes under the Programme for Belize Archaeological Project (PfBAP). In addition to his research conducted at Maya sites in Mesoamerica, Scarborough has worked in his field specialty with institutions and at site locations in Sudan, Pakistan, Indonesia, Greece and the American Southwest, among others. He is a member of the Scientific Steering Committee with IHOPE (Integrated History for the Future of the People of Earth) an effort of the International Geosphere-Biosphere Programme and the Stockholm Resilience Center, for both the global (Berlin meeting) and the regional Asia (Akita, Japan) and Americas (Santa Fe) initiatives.
