= El Progreso, Jutiapa =

- Municipality
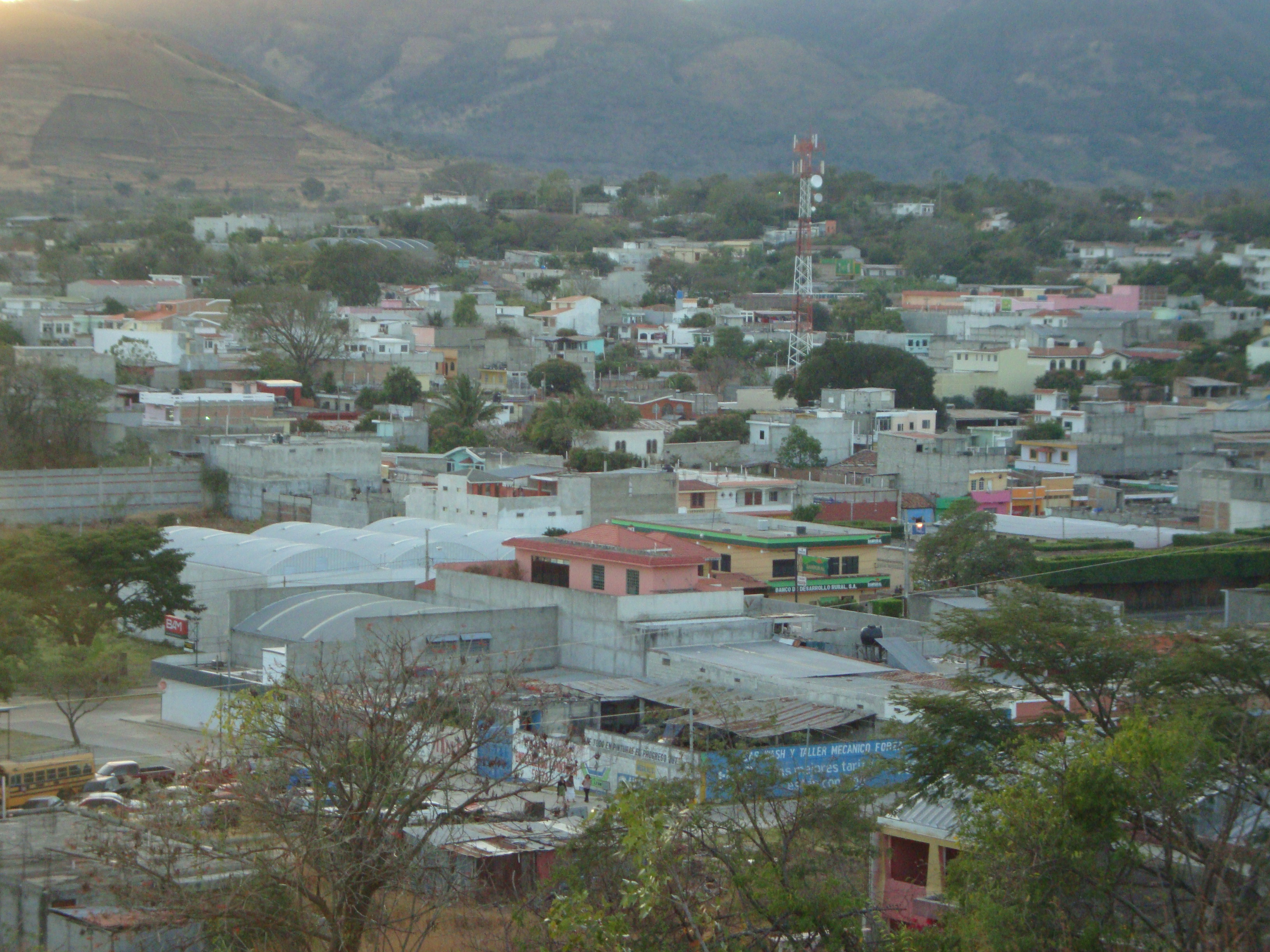

- Location in Guatemala
- Coordinates: 14°21′0″N 89°51′0″W
- Country: Guatemala
- Department: Jutiapa

Government
  - Mayor: Marvin Enrique Zepeda González

Area
  - Municipality: 40 sq mi (103 km^{2})

Population (2018 census)
  - Municipality: 22,114
  - Density: 556/sq mi (215/km^{2})
  - Urban: 9,504
- Climate: Aw

El Progreso (Spanish pronunciation: [el pɾoˈɣɾeso]), also El Progreso, Achuapa, is a town and municipality in the Jutiapa department of Guatemala. In 2018 the municipality had a population of 22,114 The Pan American Highway passes to the south of the main town, connecting it with Jutiapa, 11 kilometres (6.8 mi) to the southwest. The Morán, Chiquito and Ostúa rivers flow through the municipality. The main items produced locally include cigars, leather products, furniture, tiles and mud bricks.

== History ==
El Progreso municipality was created on 6 October 1884 under the government of General Justo Rufino Barrios. It appears as if there may well already have been a settlement called Achuapa on the site which then changed its name to El Progreso. The first settlers were the indigenous Pipiles, who grew maize, cacao and above all annatto in the Achuapa, Morán and Chiquito valleys. The name "Achuapa" appears to be derived from "achioti", the annatto-bearing achiote tree, and "pan" meaning place. Remains of the early settlers in the Achuapa Valley have been found along the banks of the Morán and Chiquito Rivers. On 24 January 1939, the government agreed to establish a Catholic Church feast day in early February to honor to the Virgin of Lourdes. The modern municipality was established by Article 3 of a government decree on 20 September 1987.

The local fiestas were originally held in connection with Trinity Sunday in May or June but are now celebrated around 11 February in remembrance of Our Lady of Lourdes.

== Geography ==
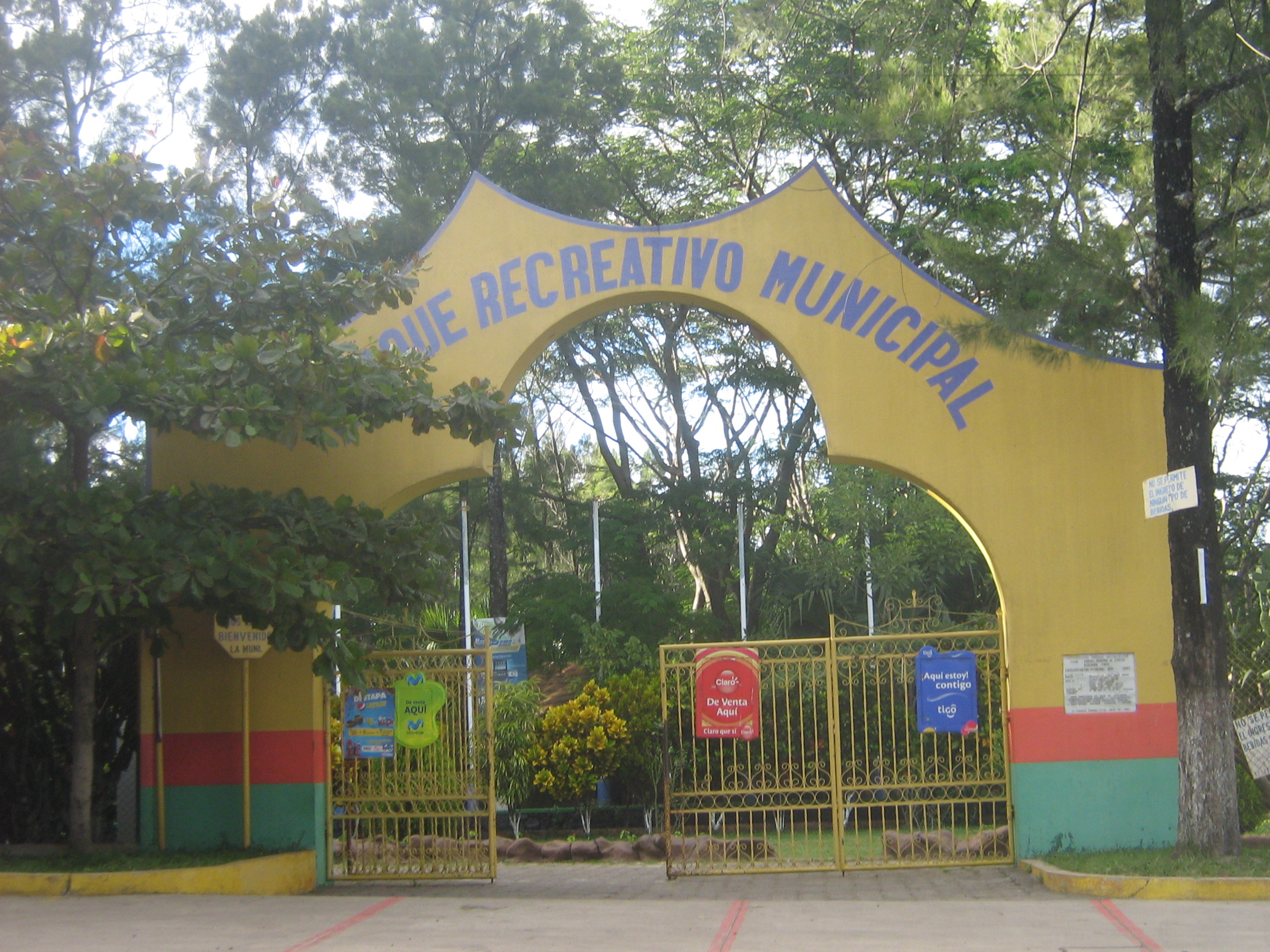
The local park

The municipality of El Progreso is situated 128 kilometres (80 mi) from Guatemala City and 11 kilometres (6.8 mi) northeast of Jutiapa, the departmental head. Jutiapa department is located within the Eastern Plains, notable for being Central America's only desert.

Situated at a height of 970 meters (3,180 ft) above sea level, El Progreso borders the municipality of Monjas to the north, the municipality of Jutiapa to the south and west, and the municipalities of Santa Catarina Mita and Asunción Mita in the department of Jutiapa to the east. The western part of the municipality contains part of the river basin of the Ostúa River and the Las Aradas hills. Other rivers include the Apantes, Chiquito, Morán and San Pedro rivers. The municipality contains the main town of El Progreso, 8 villages and 17 hamlets. The Suchitan volcano is nearby and the Pan American Highway passes to the south of the main town, connecting it with Jutiapa to the southwest.

== Economy ==
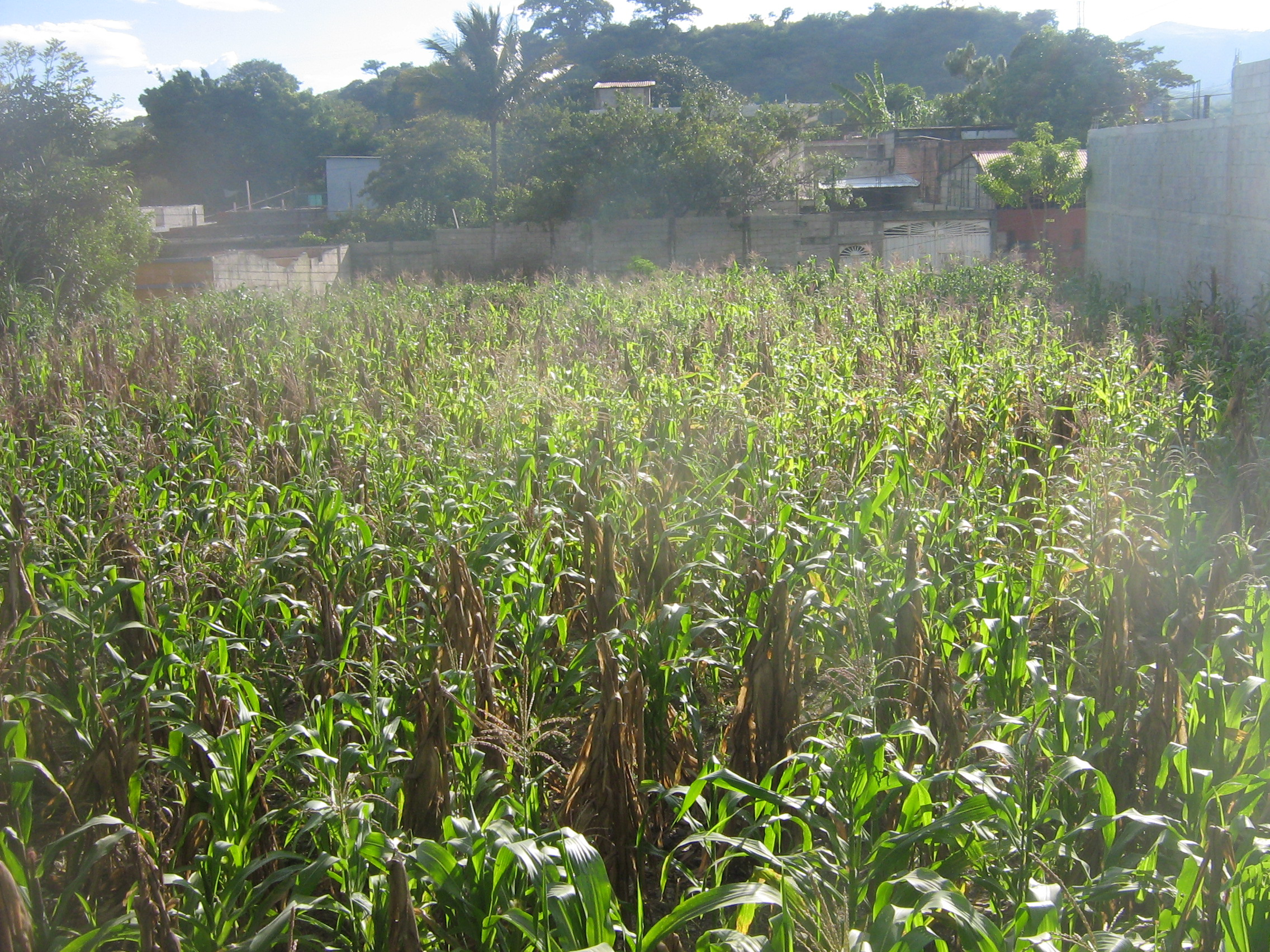
Maize cultivation in El Progreso

Historically, maize, cacao and achiote were the main crops produced in the municipality while today crops also include rice, beans and broccoli. The main items produced locally today include cigars, leather products, furniture, tiles and mud bricks. The La Cooperativa de Retana en El Progreso, a cooperative of landowners, is based in El Progreso.

== Facilities ==
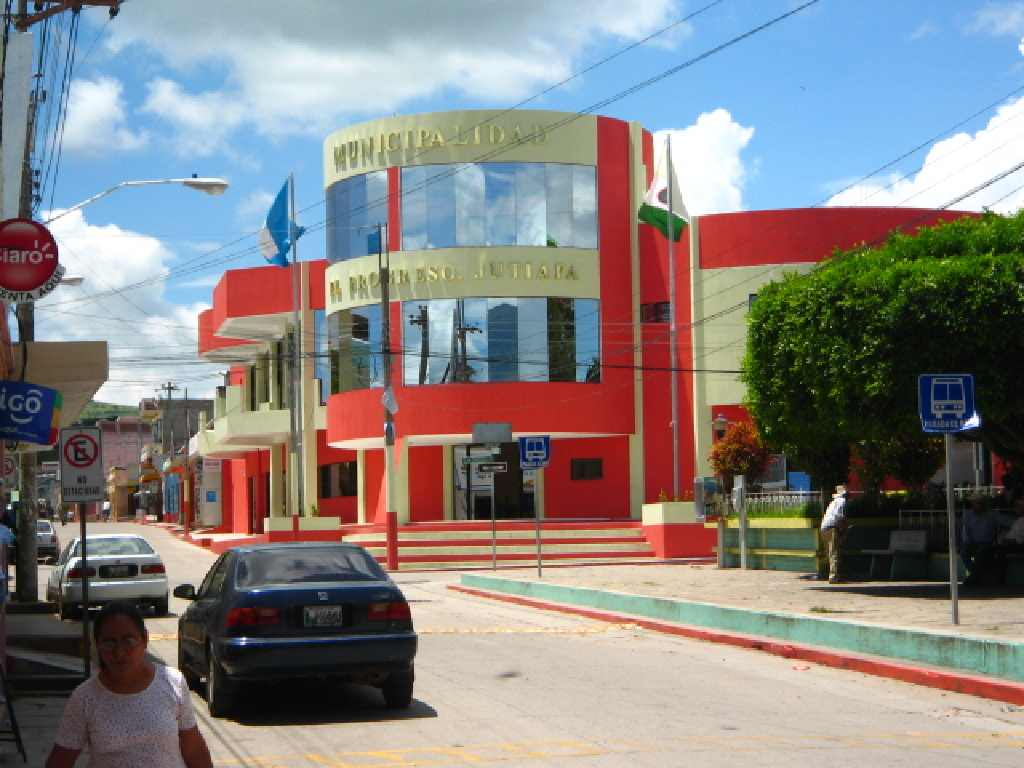
City hall

The main town contains several restaurants and churches. El Progreso has a well-designed park and a sports and recreation centre which attracts visitors not only from the surrounding areas but also from further afield. There are a number of primary schools and pre-school institutions as well as private educational centres, including Colegio Evangelico Horeb, Colegio Parroquial Mixto Nuestra Señora De Lourdes, Colegio Particular Mixto Liceo Progreso, Cpmi Liceo Progreso, Escuela Regional De Hoteleria Y Turismo Ecologico, Liceo Bilingüe, and Fray Amadeo Ruano Najarro.

== Sports ==
The football club, "Oriental Progresista" was formed in 1932. Deportivo Achuapa football club play in the second tier of Guatemalan football. The city's stadium, Estadio Municipal Manuel Ariza, is surfaced in grass and offers seating for 1,500 attendees.
