= Ciudad Pedro de Alvarado =

Town in Jutiapa, Guatemala

- Town
- Location in Guatemala
- Coordinates: 13°52′16″N 90°05′39″W
- Country: Guatemala
- Department: Jutiapa
- Municipality: Moyuta
- Elevation: 46 m (151 ft)

Population (2018)
  - Total: 2,795
- Climate: Aw

Ciudad Pedro de Alvarado is a town in the municipality of Moyuta, of the department of Jutiapa, Guatemala.

It is across the Paz River from the town of La Hachadura, El Salvador, which forms a part of the El Salvador–Guatemala border. Ciudad Pedro de Alvarado is on the CA-2 Highway, which stretches across the south of the country, and connects it to its closest major town, Chiquimulilla, 26 km away. It is 21 km away from the municipal capital of Moyuta, and 51 km from Jutiapa, the capital of its department. Ciudad Pedro de Alvarado is 97 km from the national capital, Guatemala City, and 15 km from the Pacific Ocean.

The town is named after Pedro de Alvarado.

== Transport ==
The busiest crossing by number of passengers from Guatemala to El Salvador is the CA-1, which is a part of the Pan-American Highway. However, the CA-2 which Ciudad Pedro de Alvarado is on carries the highest net weight of land transport of goods, amounting to 30% of the bilateral transport between the two countries.

The narrow Puente La Hachadura carrying CA-2 across the Paz River is reported to be too narrow, and suffers from flooding under heavy rain. As a result, It was announced by the El Salvadoran Minister of Public Works and Transport in late 2020 that a new bridge, the Puente Manuel José Arce, is to be built. The bridge is to be 160 m long, with 4 lanes and an access road of 1.4 km. US$30 million (230 million Guatemalan quetzal) was invested in the project. Construction began in November 2021.

In February 2024, in response to the high rate of road accidents in the area, an initiative was launched to educate the population on road safety.

== Demographics ==
In 2018, the population of Ciudad Pedro de Alvarado was 2795. As is the trend for the vicinity, a majority of 94% of all inhabitants were Ladino people, and 4% were Xinca.

== Climate ==
Ciudad Pedro de Alvarado has a tropical savanna climate (Köppen: Aw).

Climate data for Ciudad Pedro de Alvarado
Month	Jan	Feb	Mar	Apr	May	Jun	Jul	Aug	Sep	Oct	Nov	Dec	Year
Mean daily maximum °F (°C)	88.5 (31.4)	89.4 (31.9)	90.3 (32.4)	90.1 (32.3)	86.0 (30.0)	83.7 (28.7)	85.1 (29.5)	82.2 (27.9)	82.8 (28.2)	85.6 (29.8)	85.3 (29.6)	87.6 (30.9)	86.4 (30.2)
Daily mean °F (°C)	77.7 (25.4)	78.6 (25.9)	79.9 (26.6)	80.8 (27.1)	79.0 (26.1)	77.4 (25.2)	78.3 (25.7)	77.7 (25.4)	76.3 (24.6)	76.1 (24.5)	76.5 (24.7)	77.4 (25.2)	78.0 (25.5)
Mean daily minimum °F (°C)	69.4 (20.8)	70.2 (21.2)	71.4 (21.9)	73.2 (22.9)	73.6 (23.1)	72.7 (22.6)	72.7 (22.6)	72.7 (22.6)	72.0 (22.2)	71.2 (21.8)	70.0 (21.1)	69.6 (20.9)	71.6 (22.0)
Average precipitation inches (mm)	0.1 (2)	0.1 (2)	0.4 (10)	1.3 (34)	7.4 (187)	10.8 (274)	8.3 (211)	9.9 (251)	13.9 (352)	11.6 (294)	2.0 (52)	0.2 (5)	66 (1,674)
Source: Climate-Data.org
