= Suchitan =

Volcán Suchitán
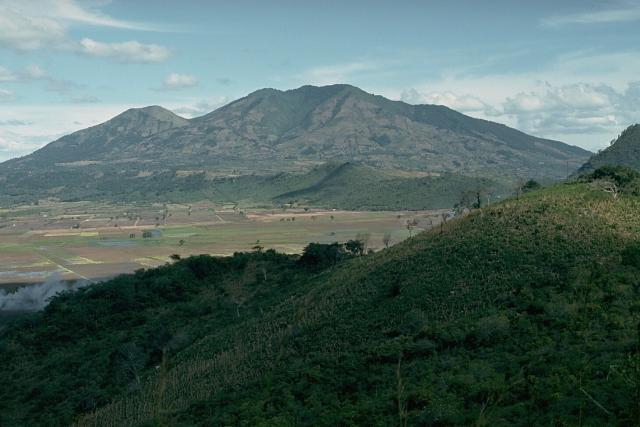

Highest point
- Elevation: 2,042 m (6,699 ft)
- Coordinates: 14°20′0″N 89°46′48″W

Geography
- Location within Guatemala
- Location: Jutiapa, Guatemala

Geology
- Mountain type: Stratovolcano
- Volcanic arc: Central America Volcanic Arc
- Last eruption: Unknown

Volcán Suchitán is a stratovolcano located in Santa Catarina Mita, Jutiapa, Guatemala. Its highest point lies at an altitude of 1,716 m (5,630 ft) above sea level.

== See also ==
- List of volcanoes in Guatemala
