= Yupiltepeque =

- Municipality
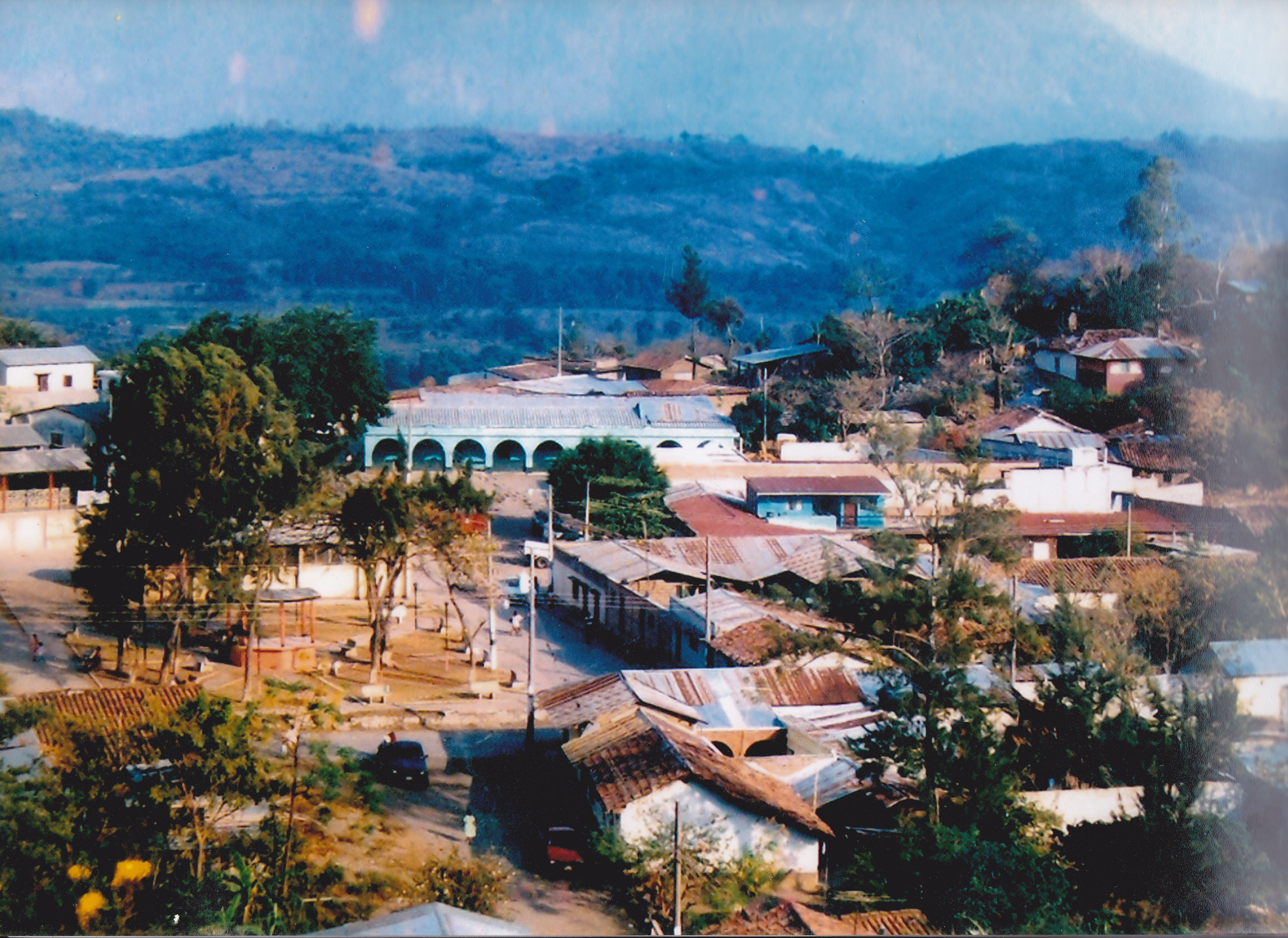

- Location in Guatemala
- Coordinates: 14°12′N 89°47′W
- Country: Guatemala
- Department: Jutiapa

Area
  - Total: 21.41 sq mi (55.44 km^{2})
- Elevation: 2,880.9 ft (878.11 m)

Population (2023)
  - Total: 18,419
  - Density: 860.5/sq mi (332.2/km^{2})
- Climate: Am

Yupiltepeque is a municipality in the department of Jutiapa in Guatemala. It covers an area of 55.44 km^{2} (21.41 sq mi). As per 2023 estimates, it has a population of about 18,419 inhabitants.

== History ==
The name Yupiltepeque is believed to have been derive from the Pipil-Xinka language, combining "yupil" meaning "flower village" and "tepeq" meaning "hill", referring to a hill on which king Tepoc resided in the ancient Pipil settlement now identified as Pueblo Viejo village. The Xincas inhabited southeastern Guatemala before the arrival of the Pipils, who migrated into the region between the 7th and 12th centuries and eventually subordinated several Xinca communities. The Xincas then expanded into areas including the present-day Yupiltepeque. During the Spanish conquest, Pedro de Alvarado invaded the Xinca territory with the support of other indigenous people, and captured the city.

According to the official decree on 27 August 1836, Yupiltepeque was attached to the circuit of Mita in the department of Chiquimula. Mita was later divided into three districts including Jutiapa on 23 February 1848, and Yupiltepeque was within the jurisdiction of Jutiapa. While it was briefly returned to the original jurisdiction from 1850 to 1852, the department of Jutiapa was created on 8 October 1852 and included Yupiltepeque. On 11 July 1906, former El Salvadoran president Tomás Regalado was killed here during the war with Guatemala.

== Geography ==
Yupiltepeque is a municipality in the department of Jutiapa in Guatemala. It is spread over an area of 55.44 km^{2} (21.41 sq mi). It is situated about 145 km (90 mi) from the national capital of Guatemala City and 23 km (14 mi) from the departmental seat of Jutiapa. It borders Jutiapa to the north, Jerez to the south, Asuncion Mita and Atescatempa to the east, and Zapotitlan and El Adelanto to the west.

It is located at an elevation of 878.11 m (2,880.9 ft) above sea level. The district has a tropical monsoon climate (Köppen climate classification: Am). The average annual temperature is 26.25 °C (79.25 °F). The district receives an average annual rainfall of 8.18 cm (3.22 in) and has 129.11 rainy days in a year.

== Demographics ==
Yupiltepeque had an estimated population of 18,419 inhabitants in 2023. The population consisted of 9,259 males and 9,160 females. About 28.4% of the population was below the age of fourteen, and 6.5% was over the age of 65 years. About 82.7% of the population was classified as rural, and the rest (17.3%) lived in urban areas. Most of the residents (88.2%) were born in the same municipality. The city had a literacy rate of 83.1%. Ladinos (76.5%) formed the major ethnic group, with Xinca (22.6%) forming a significant minority. Spanish (99.3%) was the most spoken language.
