= Elmer Obdulio Arana Quiñónez =

Guatemalan writer and Catholic apologist

- Born: May 6, 1971 (age 55); Jalpatagua, Jutiapa, Guatemala
- Occupations: Writer, Catholic apologist

Elmer Obdulio Arana Quiñónez (born May 6, 1971) is a Guatemalan writer and Catholic apologist. He is known for authoring Spanish-language books on Catholic doctrine and Marian theology.

== Early life ==
Arana Quiñónez was born in Jalpatagua, in the Jutiapa Department of Guatemala. Prior to relocating to the United States, he held roles in agriculture, construction, and banking in Guatemala and Belize.

== Career ==
After settling in the United States, Arana Quiñónez began writing religious non-fiction focused on defending Catholic teachings. His first major publication, La Iglesia Católica, la Única Fundada por Nuestro Señor Jesucristo, examines the historical foundations of the Catholic Church.

He subsequently published 225 Objeciones contra la Fe Católica y sus Respectivas Respuestas, a reference guide addressing common theological questions, as well as Dogmas Marianos, Fe y Devoción en la Iglesia Católica.

== Selected works ==
- La Iglesia Católica, la Única Fundada por Nuestro Señor Jesucristo
- 225 Objeciones contra la Fe Católica y sus Respectivas Respuestas
- Dogmas Marianos, Fe y Devoción en la Iglesia Católica
