= Conguaco =

- Location in Guatemala
- Coordinates: 14°03′N 90°02′W
- Country: Guatemala
- Department: Jutiapa

Area
  - Total: 57.9 sq mi (149.9 km^{2})

Population (2023)
  - Total: 30,281
  - Density: 523.2/sq mi (202.0/km^{2})
- Climate: Am

Conguaco is a municipality in the Jutiapa department of Guatemala. It has an area of 149.9 km^{2} (57.9 sq mi), and had a population of 30,281 as per 2023 estimate. The municipality lies close to the border with El Salvador.

== History ==
Several theories exist as to the origin of the name Conguaco. The name might mean "place of slings or grinding shells". As per another theory, it is derived from "guaco", the name of a medicinal plant used for stomach ailments in the region.

The earlier inhabitants of the region were descendants of the Pipil and Poqomam ethnic groups, and the region was called as "El Cuato de Conguaco". The existing settlement was founded in 1825. Local mythology state that an image of San Pedro appeared at a lagoon, and the people built an altar, and a church later. After the church was built, the lagoon disappeared, which enabled the people to establish the settlement.

The "pinoleada" is an annual festival celebrated on 24 April in honor of the patron San Marcos. As per tradition, the dish of pinol, which is made of maize, and meat, is prepared and distributed to the people. After the feast, the image of San Marcos is taken on a procession.

== Geography ==
Conguaco is a municipality in the department of Jutiapa in Guatemala. It is spread over an area of 149.9 km^{2} (57.9 sq mi). It is located 112 km (70 mi) from the national capital of Guatemala city and 65 km (40 mi) from the departmental capital of Jutiapa. It is bordered by the municipalities of Jalpatagua to the north and east, and Moyuta to the west. It shares land border with El Salvador to the south.

Located at an elevation of 878.11 m (2,880.9 ft) above sea level, Conguaco has a Tropical monsoon climate (Classification: Am). The district’s yearly temperature is 26.31 °C (79.36 °F) and it is 4.59% higher than Guatemala’s averages. Conguaco typically receives about 82.03 mm (3.230 in) of precipitation and has 129.43 rainy days (35.46% of the time) annually.

== Demographics ==
Conguaco had an estimated population of 30,281 inhabitants in 2023. The population consisted of 15,215 males and 15,066 females. About 36.7% of the population was below the age of fourteen, and 4.4% was over the age of 65 years. About 87.5% of the population was classified as rural, and the rest (12.5%) lived in urban areas. Most of the residents (96.1%) were born in the same municipality. The city had a literacy rate of 77.2%. Xincas (49.3%) and Ladinos (48.8%) formed the major ethnic groups. Spanish (98.9%) was the most spoken language.
