= El Adelanto =

- Municipality
- Location in Guatemala
- Coordinates: 14°10′06″N 89°43′37″W
- Country: Guatemala
- Department: Jutiapa
- Established: 23 August 1882

Area
  - Total: 13 sq mi (34 km^{2})

Population (2023 estimate)
  - Total: 8,547
  - Density: 650/sq mi (250/km^{2})
- Climate: Am

El Adelanto (Spanish pronunciation: [el aðeˈlanto]) is a town and municipality in the Jutiapa department of Guatemala. It covers an area of approximately 34 km^{2} (13 sq mi). As per 2023 estimates, it has a population of about 8,547 inhabitants.

== History ==
El Adelanto was earlier known as Aldea El Sitio, and was part of the municipality of Zapotitlán. It was officially established by the governmental decree enacted on 23 August 1882, and became a municipality on 23 March 1893. In 1925, the municipal boundaries were modified and delimited.

== Geography ==
El Adelanto is a municipality in the department of Jutiapa in Guatemala. It is spread over an area of 34 km^{2} (13 sq mi). It is located in southeastern Guatemala, 153 km (95 mi) from the national capital Guatemala City and 36 km (22 mi) from the departmental seat of Jutiapa. It borders the municipality of Jutiapa to the north, Yupiltepeque to the east, Zapotitlán to the south, and Comapa to the southwest.

Located at an elevation of 878.11 m (2,880.9 ft) above sea level, El Adelanto has a tropical monsoon climate (Classification: Am). The district has an annual average temperature of 27.17 °C (80.91 °F). El Adelanto receives about 84.7 mm (3.33 in) of precipitation and has 133.66 rainy days (36.62% of the time) on average annually.

== Demographics ==
El Adelanto had an estimated population of 8,457 inhabitants in 2023. The population consisted of 4,306 males and 4,151 females. About 28.1% of the population was below the age of fourteen, and 7.3% was over the age of 65 years. About 36% of the population was classified as rural, and the rest (64%) lived in urban areas. Most of the residents (87.6%) were born in the same municipality. The city had a literacy rate of 79.1%. Ladinos (87.4%) formed the major ethnic group, with Xinca (12.1%) forming a significant minority. Spanish (99.5%) was the most spoken language.

The people of El Adelanto are known as "ticuqueros", as they earlier went to Jutiapa or the nearby El Salvador to procure tucuco, a food item made of maize and beans. The economy is mainly dependent on agriculture, majorly maize, and beans. Livestock, horses, small fowl are also reared on a smaller scale.
