= Comapa, Jutiapa =

Comapa
- Location in Guatemala
- Coordinates: 14°07′N 89°55′W
- Country: Guatemala
- Department: Jutiapa

Population
  - Estimate (2023 projection): 37,572
- Climate: Aw

Comapa is a municipality in the department of Jutiapa in Guatemala. It is spread over an area of 168.8 km^{2} (65.2 sq mi). As per 2023 estimate, it had a population of 37,572 inhabitants. It became a municipality as per the decree on 8 May 1852.

== History ==
The name Comapa is derived from the Nahuatl "Comalli", which is a combination of "comal" meaning pot of water and the suffix of "atl" which means place, roughly translating to the place where the pot of water is located. Though the place had been inhabited since at least the seventeenth century, the name appears first in the nineteenth century. It became part of Jutiapa when three districts were formed from the erstwhile Mita department on 23 February 1848. It became a municipality as per the decree on 8 May 1852.

The Day of Kings is celebrated annually on 6 January, the patron saint festival dedicated to Virgen de Concepción from 19 to 21 August, and the municipal fair is held from 14 to 17 December.

== Geography ==
Comapa is a municipality in the department of Jutiapa in Guatemala. It is spread over an area of 168.8 km^{2} (65.2 sq mi). It is situated at an altitude of 1,250 m (4,100 ft) above sea level. It borders Jutiapa to the north, El Adelanto and Zapotitlán to the east, and Jalpatagua to the west. It shares land border with El Salvador to the south.

== Demographics ==
Comapa had an estimated population of 37,572 inhabitants in 2023. The population consisted of 18,674 males and 18,898 females. About 32.9% of the population was below the age of fourteen, and 5.9% was over the age of 65 years. About 86.3% of the population was classified as rural, and the rest (13.7%) lived in urban areas. Most of the residents (91.1%) were born in the same municipality. The city had a literacy rate of 76.5%. Ladinos (87.1%) formed the major ethnic group, with Xinca (11.3%) forming a significant minority. Spanish (99.3%) was the most spoken language.
