= Zapotitlán, Jutiapa =

Zapotitlán
- Location in Guatemala
- Coordinates: 14°8′0″N 89°50′0″W
- Country: Guatemala
- Department: Jutiapa

Area
  - Total: 34.30 sq mi (88.84 km^{2})

Population (2023 estimate)
  - Total: 10,694
- Climate: Am

Zapotitlán (Spanish pronunciation: [sapotiˈtlan]) is a municipality in the Jutiapa Department of Guatemala. It covers an area of approximately 88.84 km^{2} (34.30 sq mi). As per 2023 estimates, it has a population of about 10,694 inhabitants. It is located close to the international border with El Salvador.

== History ==
Zapotitlán is described as derived from Nahuatl language "zapotl", which is a comibnation of two words "zapote" and "tlan" roughly translating to "place of zapotes" or "abundance of zapotes". As per the locals, the area was historically known as "La Laguna" due to a seasonal lagoon that would form south of the town during rainy season.

In the 19th century, Zapotitlán was part of various administrative units beginning with the circuit of Mita from 1 October 1825. It was later incorporated into the department of Jutiapa when the district was originally created on 23 February 1948.

== Geography ==
Zapotitlán is a municipality in the department of Jutiapa in Guatemala. It is spread over an area of 88.84 km^{2} (34.30 sq mi). It is situated about 157 km (98 mi) from the national capital of Guatemala City and 36 km (22 mi) from the departmental seat of Jutiapa. It borders the municipalities of El Adelanto and Yupiltepeque to the north, Comapa and El Adelanto to the east, and Jerez to the east. It shares land border with El Salvador to the south.

Located at an elevation of 878.11 m (2,880.9 ft) above sea level, the district has a tropical monsoon climate (Köppen climate classification: Am). The average annual temperature is 27.09 °C (80.76 °F). The district receives an average annual rainfall of 8.45 cm (3.33 in) and has 133.26 average rainy days in a year.

== Demographics ==
Zapotitlán had an estimated population of 10,693 inhabitants in 2023. The population consisted of 5,367 males and 5,326 females. About 29.4% of the population was below the age of fourteen, and 6.9% was over the age of 65 years. About 76.8% of the population was classified as rural, and the rest (23.2%) lived in urban areas. Most of the residents (88.0%) were born in the same municipality. The city had a literacy rate of 83.8%. Ladinos (81.6%) formed the major ethnic group, with Xinca (17.6%) forming a significant minority. Spanish (99.2%) was the most spoken language.

The economy is mainly dependent on agriculture, especially maize.

== Culture ==
The city celebrates two patron saint festivals annually. The May festival honors the Holy Cross and the September festival dedicated to Saint Michael. The Dance of the Moors, reenacts the fight between the Christians and the indigenous people under the command of El Cuto Partideño.
