= Zapotitlán (municipality) =

- Zapotitlán, Jutiapa, Guatemala
- Zapotitlán Municipality, Puebla, Mexico
