= Quesada, Guatemala =

Quesada
- Municipality
- Location in Guatemala
- Coordinates: 14°16′16″N 90°02′15″W
- Country: Guatemala
- Department: Jutiapa

Area
  - Total: 45.1 sq mi (116.9 km^{2})
- Elevation: 3,227.3 ft (983.68 m)

Population (2023)
  - Total: 24,020
  - Density: 532.2/sq mi (205.5/km^{2})
- Climate: Am

Quesada is a municipality in the department of Jutiapa in Guatemala. It covers an area of approximately 116.9 km^{2} (45.1 sq mi). As per 2023 estimates, it has a population of about 24,020 inhabitants.

== History ==
According to the historical records, it was named by the Quezada family due to its resemblance to their native estate of Quezada in Spain. It was later acquired by the writer José Milla y Vidaurre, who retain the name for the place. However, the local inhabitants later began calling it Quesada with an "s" because the estate produced the best cheese in the region. The municipality of Quesada was created by official decree on 18 June 1897, during the presidency of José María Reina Barrios.

== Geography ==
Quesada is a municipality in the department of Jutiapa in Guatemala. It is spread over an area of 116.9 km^{2} (45.1 sq mi). It is located in the western part of the department, about 19 km (12 mi) from the departmental capital of Jutiapa. It borders the municipalities of Casillas to the north, San José Acatempa and Jalpatagua to the west, and Jutiapa to the south and east.

Located at an elevation of 983.68 m (3,227.3 ft) above sea level, Quesada has a tropical monsoon climate (Köppen climate classification: Am). The district has an average annual temperature of 25.31 °C (77.56 °F). Quesada typically receives about 78.89 mm (3.106 in) of precipitation and has 124.48 rainy days (34.1% of the time) on average annually.

== Demographics ==
Quesada had an estimated population of 24,020 inhabitants in 2023. The population consisted of 11,987 males and 12,033 females. About 27.5% of the population was below the age of fourteen, and 7.2% was over the age of 65 years. About 88.8% of the population was classified as rural, and the rest (11.2%) lived in urban areas. Most of the residents (87.6%) were born in the same municipality. The city had a literacy rate of 86.2%. Ladinos (58.4%) and Xincas (40.3%) are the major ethnic groups. Spanish (99%) was the most spoken language.
