= Atescatempa =

- Municipality
- Location in Guatemala
- Coordinates: 14°10′30″N 89°44′30″W
- Country: Guatemala
- Department: Jutiapa

Area
  - Total: 30.98 sq mi (80.23 km^{2})

Population (2023)
  - Total: 20,300
  - Density: 655/sq mi (253/km^{2})
- Climate: Aw

Atescatempa is a municipality in the department of Jutiapa in Guatemala. It covers an area of approximately 80.23 km^{2} (30.98 sq mi). As per 2023 estimates, it has a population of about 20,300 inhabitants. The municipality lies close to the border with El Salvador.

== History ==
Atescatempa is described as derived from Pipil language meaning "place on the shore of a pond". As per local legend, it was a flourishing town ruled by a chief named Atezcatl, and was engaged in conflict with the neighboring groups. The original settlement was damaged by volcanic activity from the Chingo volcano, which forced the population to move to the current location. There are various local legends associated with the destruction of the town, and associated elements.

In the 19th century, Atescatempa was part of various administrative units. It was incorporated into the department of Jutiapa on 8 May 1852, when the department was officially created during Guatemala’s territorial reorganization. It was formally recognized as a municipality in 1863.

== Geography ==
Atescatempa is a municipality in the department of Jutiapa in Guatemala. It is spread over an area of 80.23 km^{2} (30.98 sq mi). It is situated about 174 km (108 mi) from Guatemala City. It borders Asunción Mita to the north, Jerez to the west, and Yupiltepeque to the east. It shares land border with El Salvador to the south.

It is located at an elevation of 700.77 m (2,299.1 ft) above sea level. The district has a tropical monsoon climate (Köppen climate classification: Am). The average annual temperature is 26.15 °C (79.07 °F). The district receives an average annual rainfall of 8.15 cm (3.21 in) and has 128.61 rainy days in a year.

== Demographics ==
Atescatempa had an estimated population of 20,300 inhabitants in 2023. The population consisted of 9,878 males and 10,422 females. About 24.3% of the population was below the age of fourteen, and 8.9% was over the age of 65 years. About 47.8% of the population was classified as rural, and the rest (52.2%) lived in urban areas. Most of the residents (88.9%) were born in the same municipality. The city had a literacy rate of 84.3%. Ladinos (96.0%) formed the major ethnic group, with Xinca (2.9%) forming a minor minority. Spanish (99.2%) was the most spoken language.
