= Asunción Mita =

- Municipality and town

- Location in Guatemala
- Coordinates: 14°20′N 89°43′W
- Country: Guatemala
- Department: Jutiapa

Area
  - Total: 195.6 sq mi (506.5 km^{2})

Population (2023)
  - Total: 53,944
  - Density: 275.8/sq mi (106.5/km^{2})
- Climate: Am

Asunción Mita (Spanish pronunciation: [asunˈsjom ˈmita]) is a town and a municipality in the Jutiapa department of Guatemala. It covers an area of approximately 506.5 km^{2} (195.6 sq mi). As per 2023 estimates, it has a population of about 53,944 inhabitants. The municipality lies close to the border with El Salvador.

== History ==
Asunción Mita is described as derived from the Nahuatl word Mictlan, meaning "place of the dead". Before the Spanish colonialization, it served as the capital of the kingdom of Mita and the chiefdom of Mictlán. After the Spanish arrival, a new town was founded near the ruins of the previous indigenous settlement. The municipality declined during Spanish colonial rule, partly due to restrictions on indigo cultivation, which shifted economic activity to other regions and reduced its former importance.

Mita was one of the districts of the Chiquimula department formed by the government decree on 4 November 1825. On 8 May 1852, Mita district was divided into two districts–Asunción Mita and Santa Catarina Mita, and both of them were incorporated as a part of Jutiapa. However, it was re-incorporated later into Chiquimula, and on 19 November 1853, it was again segregated from Chiquimula and annexed to Jutiapa. It was listed as villa on 11 February 1915.

== Geography ==
Asunción Mita is a municipality in the department of Jutiapa in Guatemala. It is spread over an area of 506.5 km^{2} (195.6 sq mi). It is situated about 146 km (91 mi) from Guatemala City. It borders Santa Catarina Mita and Agua Blanca to the north, Atescatempa, and Yupiltepeque to the south, and Jutiapa and Yupiltepeque to the west. It shares a land border with El Salvador to the east and south. The municipality is located in a fertile plains bound by the Ostúa and Tamasulapa rivers, and considered one of the best agricultural zones on Guatemala’s coastal region.

== Climate ==
Asuncion Mita is located at an elevation of 878.11 m (2,880.9 ft) above sea level. The district has a tropical monsoon climate (Köppen climate classification: Am). The average annual temperature is 25.17 °C (77.31 °F). The district receives an average annual rainfall of 7.84 cm (3.09 in) and has 123.78 rainy days in a year.

Climate data for Asunción Mita (1991–2020)
Month	Jan	Feb	Mar	Apr	May	Jun	Jul	Aug	Sep	Oct	Nov	Dec	Year
Record high °C (°F)	37.2 (99.0)	38.8 (101.8)	39.8 (103.6)	40.8 (105.4)	39.4 (102.9)	37.8 (100.0)	37.8 (100.0)	38.4 (101.1)	37.2 (99.0)	37.5 (99.5)	36.8 (98.2)	37.8 (100.0)	40.8 (105.4)
Mean daily maximum °C (°F)	33.2 (91.8)	34.5 (94.1)	35.6 (96.1)	36.4 (97.5)	35.1 (95.2)	33.6 (92.5)	34.0 (93.2)	34.0 (93.2)	33.3 (91.9)	32.9 (91.2)	32.7 (90.9)	32.9 (91.2)	34.0 (93.2)
Daily mean °C (°F)	26.1 (79.0)	27.2 (81.0)	28.3 (82.9)	29.5 (85.1)	28.7 (83.7)	27.5 (81.5)	27.9 (82.2)	27.7 (81.9)	26.8 (80.2)	26.6 (79.9)	26.3 (79.3)	26.0 (78.8)	27.4 (81.3)
Mean daily minimum °C (°F)	19.7 (67.5)	20.2 (68.4)	21.0 (69.8)	22.2 (72.0)	22.5 (72.5)	21.9 (71.4)	22.1 (71.8)	21.9 (71.4)	21.4 (70.5)	21.3 (70.3)	20.7 (69.3)	20.0 (68.0)	21.2 (70.2)
Record low °C (°F)	13.0 (55.4)	13.2 (55.8)	14.6 (58.3)	16.3 (61.3)	17.9 (64.2)	16.9 (62.4)	18.2 (64.8)	18.4 (65.1)	18.4 (65.1)	15.4 (59.7)	12.4 (54.3)	12.8 (55.0)	12.4 (54.3)
Average precipitation mm (inches)	0.5 (0.02)	3.9 (0.15)	6.5 (0.26)	34.7 (1.37)	183.6 (7.23)	276.4 (10.88)	197.8 (7.79)	225.3 (8.87)	284.6 (11.20)	164.1 (6.46)	30.6 (1.20)	5.6 (0.22)	1,413.6 (55.65)
Average precipitation days (≥ 1.0 mm)	0.2	0.6	0.9	2.8	10.3	15.6	12.7	14.3	17.7	11.0	2.4	0.7	89.2
Source: NOAA

== Demographics ==
As of 1850, Asuncion Mita had a population of approximately 3,300. It had an estimated population of 53,944 inhabitants in 2023. The population consisted of 26,791 males and 27,153 females. About 24.3% of the population was below the age of fourteen, and 9.1% was over the age of 65 years. About 56.7% of the population was classified as rural, and the rest (43.3%) lived in urban areas. Most of the residents (82.6%) were born in the same municipality. The city had a literacy rate of 85.8%. Ladinos (95.9%) formed the major ethnic group, with Xinca (1.8%) forming a minor minority. Spanish (99.1%) was the most spoken language.
