= Moyuta (volcano) =

Mountain in Guatemala

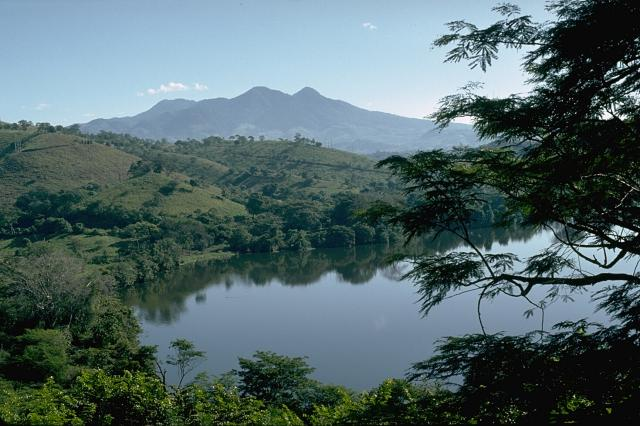

Highest point
- Elevation: 1,662 m (5,453 ft)
- Coordinates: 14°01′48″N 90°06′00″W

Geography
- Location within Guatemala
- Location: Guatemala

Geology
- Mountain type: Stratovolcano
- Volcanic arc: Central America Volcanic Arc
- Last eruption: Unknown

Moyuta is a stratovolcano in southern Guatemala. It is located near the town of Moyuta in Santa Rosa Department, and is situated at the southern edge of the Jaltapagua fault. The volcano has an elevation of 1,662 m (5,453 ft) and its summit is formed by three andesitic lava domes. The slopes of the volcano complex have numerous cinder cones. Small fumaroles can be seen on the northern and southern slopes, and hot springs are found at the north-eastern base of the volcano, as well as along rivers on south-eastern side. The volcano is covered with forest and coffee plantations.

== See also ==
- List of volcanoes in Guatemala
