= Quezalapa =

- Town
- Location in El Salvador
- Coordinates: 13°50′55.00″N 89°48′51.01″W
- Country: El Salvador
- Department: Ahuachapán Department
- Elevation: 1,404 m (4,606 ft)
- Time zone: UTC-06:00

Quezalapa is a town in Ahuachapán, El Salvador.

Quezalapa is the Nahuat word for the Quetzal bird.

It is located 43 mi (or 70 km) West of San Salvador, the country's capital.

Nearby is Cerro de Apaneca mountain which is part of the Quezalapa mountain range and is the source of the Paz river.

According to the census of population and housing carried out by the National Institute of statistics and geography in 2005, the population of Quetazalapa had a total of 808 inhabitants, of which 377 were men and 431 were women.
