= Jalpatagua =

- Municipality
- Location in Guatemala
- Coordinates: 14°08′N 90°01′W
- Country: Guatemala
- Department: Jutiapa

Area
  - Total: 67.9 sq mi (175.8 km^{2})

Population (2023 estimate)
  - Total: 31,858
  - Density: 469.4/sq mi (181.2/km^{2})
- Climate: Am

Jalpatagua (Spanish pronunciation: [xalpaˈtaɣwa]) is a town and municipality in the Jutiapa department of Guatemala. It covers an area of approximately 175.8 km^{2} (67.9 sq mi). As per 2023 estimates, it has a population of about 31,858 inhabitants. The municipality lies close to the border with El Salvador.

== History ==
Jalpatagua is believed to have been derive from the Nahuatl language words "jal", "atl", and "patlaguac", meaning aspiration, water, and wide respectively and can be roughly interpreted as "wide river".

During the late 16th century, the inhabitants were mostly indigenous Pipil and Mulatto people, while the Spanish owned agricultural estates in the region. Over time, the agricultural farms developed supported by the rivers, and fertile land, which resulted in further immigration. In the 18th century, Jalpatagua was an important center for cattle trade. Historical records from 1806 refer to the settlement as "Xalpatagua", then belonging to the curato of San Pedro Conguaco in the mayoralty of Escuintla.

Administratively, Jalpatagua underwent several jurisdictional changes during the 19th century. It became part of the Jutiapa department in 1852, which later lost that status in 1883. It was finally re-established as a municipality of Jutiapa Department by government decree on 30 January 1886.

== Geography ==
Jalpatagua is a municipality in the department of Jutiapa in Guatemala. It is spread over an area of 175.8 km^{2} (67.9 sq mi). It is situated about 102 km (63 mi) from the national capital of Guatemala City and 37 km (23 mi) from the departmental seat of Jutiapa. It borders the municipalities of San José Acatempa and Quesada to the north, Oratorio and Moyuta to the west, and Conguaco and Moyuta to the east. It shares land border with El Salvador to the south.

Located at an elevation of 570.18 m (1,870.7 ft) above sea level, Jalpatagua has a tropical monsoon climate (Köppen climate classification: Am). The district has an average annual temperature of 27.13 °C (80.83 °F). Jalpatagua typically receives about 84.58 mm (3.330 in) of and has 133.47 rainy days (36.57% of the time) on average annually.

== Demographics ==
Jalpatagua had an estimated population of 31,858 inhabitants in 2023. The population consisted of 15,910 males and 15,948 females. About 28.1% of the population was below the age of fourteen, and 6.8% was over the age of 65 years. About 35.8% of the population was classified as rural, and the rest (64.2%) lived in urban areas. Most of the residents (83.3%) were born in the same municipality. The city had a literacy rate of 85.6%. Ladinos (89.6%) formed the major ethnic group, with Xinca (8.3%) forming a significant minority. Spanish (98.7%) was the most spoken language.
