= Paz River =

Río Paz
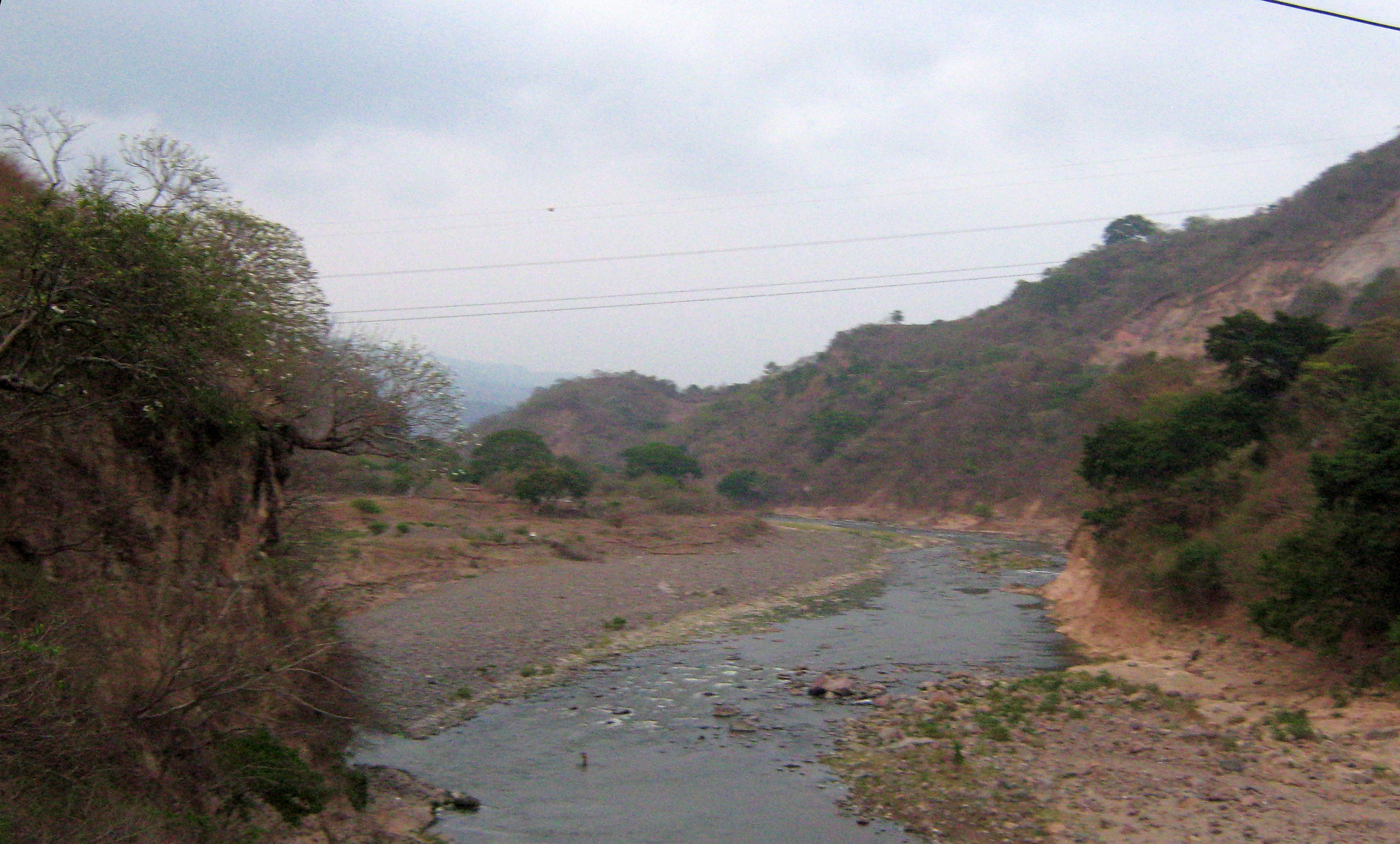

- Location of mouth

Location
- Countries: Guatemala; El Salvador

Physical characteristics
- Source
  - location: Quezalapa Mountains, Guatemala
  - coordinates: 14°22′06″N 90°02′13″W
  - elevation: 1,700 m (5,600 ft)
- Mouth
  - location: Pacific Ocean
  - coordinates: 13°46′16″N 90°10′57″W
  - elevation: 0 m (0 ft)
- Length: 134 km (83 mi)
- Discharge
  - average: 23.2 m^{3}/s (820 cu ft/s) (at El Jobo)

The Río Paz (Spanish pronunciation: [ˈri.o pas]) is a river in southern Guatemala. Its sources are located in the Quezalapa mountains in the north of Jutiapa. From there it flows in a south-westerly direction and marks the border with El Salvador for most of its course before reaching the Pacific Ocean at 13°46′16″N 90°10′57″W.

The Paz River is 134 kilometres (83 mi) long, and its basin covers a territory of 1,732 square kilometres (669 mi^{2}) in Guatemala.

It flows through the Ahuachapán Department and into the Laguna el Espino.
