= Ostúa River =

Ostúa River (Spanish pronunciation: [osˈtu.a]) is a river of El Salvador and Guatemala. It is a tributary of the Lempa River, Olopa, Chiquimula.
