= San José Acatempa =

Municipality in Jutiapa, Guatemala

Coordinates: 14°16′N 90°08′W

San José Acatempa is a municipality in the Jutiapa department of Guatemala. One of the first towns founded by the Spanish conquistadors in 1525 under the command of Capitán General Don Pedro de Alvarado y Contreras, which was on route to conquer the region of the old kingdom of Cuzcatlan, now parts of southeastern Guatemala and the republic of El Salvador. The town was previously known by the name of Azacualpa, and during the colonial period, the region was known as Valle de Zacualpa. San José Acatempa received its current name in 1944 by order of General Jorge Ubico.

== History ==
According to historical records, the region was originally occupied by indigenous people that were either annihilated or expelled by groups of families of Spanish conquistadors. These pioneers were self-denominated as gypsies from Hungary and Spanish-speaking, some Hungarians were Jews but the majority belonged to the Romani ethnicity that were mixed with Spaniards that originated mainly from Navarra, País Vasco, and Andalucia. This explains the small proportion of individuals with light dark skin, a characteristic of people with Mediterranean origin. Another discussed hypothesis asserts that those Romani may have arrived to Spain from Jewish descendants passing through Egypt and Morocco. Among the original families of which took over the lands of San José Acatempa include the family surnames of: Alvarez, Boteo, Cano, Castillo, Cermeño, García, Jiménez, Pernillo, Pineda, among others. The surname of Segura was added later, which according to records began by the arrival of the colonel of the colonial Spanish army Carlos Segura in the late 19th century. Coronel Segura later took the commanding officer position of the army in Azacualpa.

== Culture ==
Currently, San José Acatempa is a municipality with an estimated population of approximately 14,000; since the foundation of the municipality, in 1525, migration has occurred to departments in the oriental region and the capital of the country, Guatemala city. It is believed that at least 4,000 people have migrated to the United States from the 1960s alone, such migration has been driven by economic reasons and search for educational opportunities. Jokingly, people states that there are more Acatempans in USA than the town itself.

In general, people from Acatempa have great appreciation for horsemanship. The population is primarily dedicated to the cultivation of coffee. Historically, high proportion among male adults find jobs in the army, police forces, and private security companies. In contrast, women tend to work in domestic duties. Culturally, males accustom to dress cowboy style and women dress very conservative. Both males and females show preference for ranchera music, and this, makes the guitar and accordion the most popular played instruments in the municipality. Spanish is the spoken language, and it is characterized by common usage of old Spanish/Castilian forms. The people of Acatempa are known for their genuine hospitality, they receive visitors with open arms.

== Major problems ==
Major problems of the municipality include but not limited to: violent crimes, land tenure, scarcity of water, contaminated river, lack of agricultural extension services, health care services, and extreme poverty.

== Palacio Municipal ==
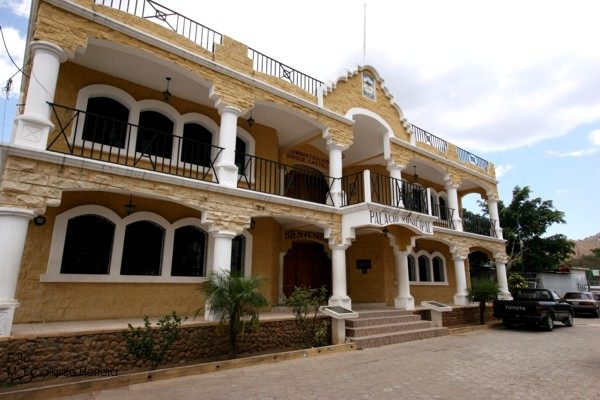
