= Monjas =

- Municipality

- Location in Guatemala
- Coordinates: 14°30′N 89°52′W
- Country: Guatemala
- Department: Jalapa

Area
  - Total: 152 km^{2} (59 sq mi)

Population (2018 census)
  - Total: 27,354
  - Density: 180/km^{2} (466/sq mi)
- Climate: Aw

Monjas is a town, with a population of 13,541 (2018 census), and a municipality in the Jalapa department of Guatemala, approximately 80 kilometres (50 mi) from Guatemala City, Guatemala.
