= Moyuta =

- Municipality
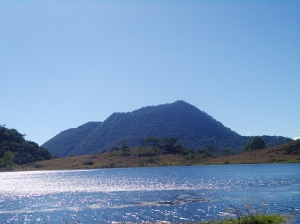

- Location in Guatemala
- Coordinates: 14°02′N 90°05′W
- Country: Guatemala
- Department: Jutiapa

Area
  - Municipality: 148 sq mi (383 km^{2})

Population (2018 census)
  - Municipality: 39,781
  - Density: 269/sq mi (104/km^{2})
  - Urban: 6,779
- Climate: Aw

Moyuta is a town and municipality in the Jutiapa department of Guatemala.

== Topography ==
Moyuta main topographic items
Place	Names
Volcanoes	Volcán Moyuta
Hills	El volcán, Cerro Gordo, Las Cruzadillas, Chile Dante, Loma Larga, El Zapote, Ventana, La Bandera
Mountains	El Cuilotillo, El Maguey, San Andrés, El Quequesque, San Antonio, El Melonar, El Toro, La Nueva
Rivers	San Miguel, San Antonio, Paz, Los Encuentros, Las Carretas y otros de menor importancia
Ponds	Bocana del Paz, la Barra del Jiote, El Tule, Laguna Grande, El Muchacho, San Juan, Laguna Encantada, Nisguaya, Las Hojas, Laguna El Comendador

== Administrative division ==
The municipality has 54 villages and 30 settlements, and it annual fair takes place between 10 and 15 March.

Moyuta's administrative division
Village	Settlements	Village	Settlements	Village	Settlements	Village	Settlements
Moyuta	La Lejía, El Paso y Cañada	Las Lomas	Los Laureles y El Caramo	El Pino de Santa Cruz	La Coyota	Ciudad Pedro de Alvarado	
La Montaña		Bethania		La Ceiba		La Danta	
El Paraíso	El Embarcadero.	Garita Chapina	Las Champas y El Bijagual	Las Cuarentiuna		Poza del Llano	
El Chagüite		Las Raíces	Las Bisnagras, El Jocotal y Zapote	Barranca Honda	Fincas de Cerro Gordo, El Zapote y Miramar	Los Achiotes	Tierra Blanca
Las Minas		La Cañada		Buena Vista	Los Ausoles	El Garrobo	
La Laguna		San Andrés		El Toro	El Obrajito	El Obraje	El Obrajito
La Barrita	Barra de la Gabina y Barra del Jiote	Monterrico		El Salamar	El Naranjo	Parcelamiento Montufar	El Nuevo, Las Flores y Hacienda Vieja.
Valle Nuevo	Los Ángeles	Palos Abrazados		La Cruzadilla		San Antonio Miramar	
El Quequesque		El Nanzal		El Rosario		El Sitio	
San Isidro	Loma Larga	San Cayetano	La Ceibilla	Las Hilas	Las Hilitas	El Sacamil	San Miguel
El Pinito	Las Vigas	Las Tablas	La Laguneta	Las Cofradías		El Rodeo	

== Education ==
Centers for education
Level	Names
Private schools	Liceo Integral «Galileo»; Instituto Privado Tecnológico de Suroriente; Colegio Particular Mixto «San Francisco y Santa Clara»; Colegio Privado «Guillermo Putzeis Álvarez»
Public Middle and High schools	Instituto Nacional de Educación Diversificada «INED» (Complejo Educativo «La Reforma»); Instituto Nacional de Educación Básica; Instituto Nacional de Educación Diversificada
Public elementary schools	Escuela Normal Infantil Intercultural; Escuela Oficial Urbana Mixta
Academies	Academia y Centro de Aprendizajes de Tecnología de la Información y Comunicación «SIM»; Academia y Centro de Aprendizajes de Tecnología de la Información y Comunicación «Perseverancia»; Academia de Mecanografía «El Éxito»; Academia de computación «SIAT»; Academia de computación «ACCES»; Academia Comercial de Mecanografía y Computación «San Judas Tadeo»

== Climate ==
Moyuta has a tropical savanna climate (Köppen: Aw).

Climate data for Moyuta
Month	Jan	Feb	Mar	Apr	May	Jun	Jul	Aug	Sep	Oct	Nov	Dec	Year
Mean daily maximum °C (°F)	26.5 (79.7)	27.2 (81.0)	28.4 (83.1)	28.3 (82.9)	27.5 (81.5)	26.0 (78.8)	26.8 (80.2)	26.4 (79.5)	25.8 (78.4)	25.5 (77.9)	25.6 (78.1)	25.7 (78.3)	26.6 (80.0)
Daily mean °C (°F)	20.8 (69.4)	21.3 (70.3)	22.1 (71.8)	22.6 (72.7)	22.3 (72.1)	21.5 (70.7)	22.0 (71.6)	21.6 (70.9)	21.4 (70.5)	21.0 (69.8)	20.7 (69.3)	20.5 (68.9)	21.5 (70.7)
Mean daily minimum °C (°F)	15.1 (59.2)	15.4 (59.7)	15.9 (60.6)	16.9 (62.4)	17.2 (63.0)	17.0 (62.6)	17.2 (63.0)	16.9 (62.4)	17.0 (62.6)	16.6 (61.9)	15.9 (60.6)	15.4 (59.7)	16.4 (61.5)
Average precipitation mm (inches)	9 (0.4)	6 (0.2)	16 (0.6)	62 (2.4)	215 (8.5)	405 (15.9)	301 (11.9)	297 (11.7)	420 (16.5)	282 (11.1)	55 (2.2)	16 (0.6)	2,084 (82)
Source: Climate-Data.org

== Geographic location ==
Moyuta has an area of 380 km^{2} and is located at 1.283 m above sea level.

== Notes and references ==
=== Bibliography ===
- Boche, Evelyn; Espina, Cindy (30 August 2015). "La Patrona, el alcalde y la batalla por Moyuta". ElPeriódico (in Spanish). Guatemala. Archived from the original on October 11, 2015.
- Escalante Herrera, Marco Antonio (2007). "Breve información de Moyuta". Pbase (in Spanish). Guatemala. Archived from the original on June 18, 2010.
- Juarros, Domingo (1818). Compendio de la historia de la Ciudad de Guatemala (in Spanish). Guatemala: Ignacio Beteta.
- Marure, Alejandro; Fuentes Franco, Andrés (1856). Catálogo razonado de las leyes de Guatemala (in Spanish). Guatemala: La Paz. p. 361.
- SEGEPLAN (n.d.). "Municipios del departamento de Jutiapa". SEGEPLAN, Gobierno de Guatemala (in Spanish). Guatemala. Archived from the original on July 7, 2015.
