= Jerez, Jutiapa =

Jerez
- Municipality

- Location in Guatemala
- Coordinates: 14.1°N 89.75°W
- Country: Guatemala
- Department: Jutiapa

Area
  - Total: 18.04 sq mi (46.72 km^{2})

Population (2023)
  - Total: 7,006
  - Density: 388.4/sq mi (150.0/km^{2})

Jerez (Spanish pronunciation: [xeˈɾes]) is a municipality in the Jutiapa Department of Guatemala. It covers an area of approximately 46.72 km^{2} (18.04 sq mi). As per 2023 estimates, it has a population of about 7,006 inhabitants.

== History ==
The municipality of Jerez was earlier known as Chingo due to its location on the slopes of the volcano of the same name. The town was founded in the 18th century, and was named Jerez in honor of the Nicaraguan general Máximo Jerez. It is cited as part of the Mita department as per the government decree on 27 August 1836. On 8 May 1852, when the department of Jutiapa was created by government decree, and Jerez became part of it. It was officially declared as a municipality on 5 October 1892 during the reign of president José María Reyna Barrios.

== Geography ==
Jerez is a municipality in the department of Jutiapa in Guatemala. It is spread over an area of 46.72 km^{2} (18.04 sq mi).

Located at an elevation of 878.11 m (2,880.9 ft) above sea level, Jerez has a tropical monsoon climate (Köppen climate classification: Am). The district has an annual average temperature of 27.58 °C (81.64 °F). Jerez typically receives about 85.98 mm (3.385 in) of precipitation and has 135.67 rainy days (37.17% of the time) on average annually.

== Demographics ==
Jerez had an estimated population of 7,006 inhabitants in 2023. The population consisted of 3,498 males and 3,508 females. About 24.9% of the population was below the age of fourteen, and 10.5% was over the age of 65 years. About 40.7% of the population was classified as rural, and the rest (59.3%) lived in urban areas. Most of the residents (80.1%) were born in the same municipality. The city had a literacy rate of 85.6%. Ladinos (95.6%) formed the major ethnic group, with Xinca (2.6%) forming a minor minority. Spanish (98.7%) was the most spoken language.
