= Santa Catarina Mita =

Municipality of Jutiapa Department, Guatemala

- Municipality
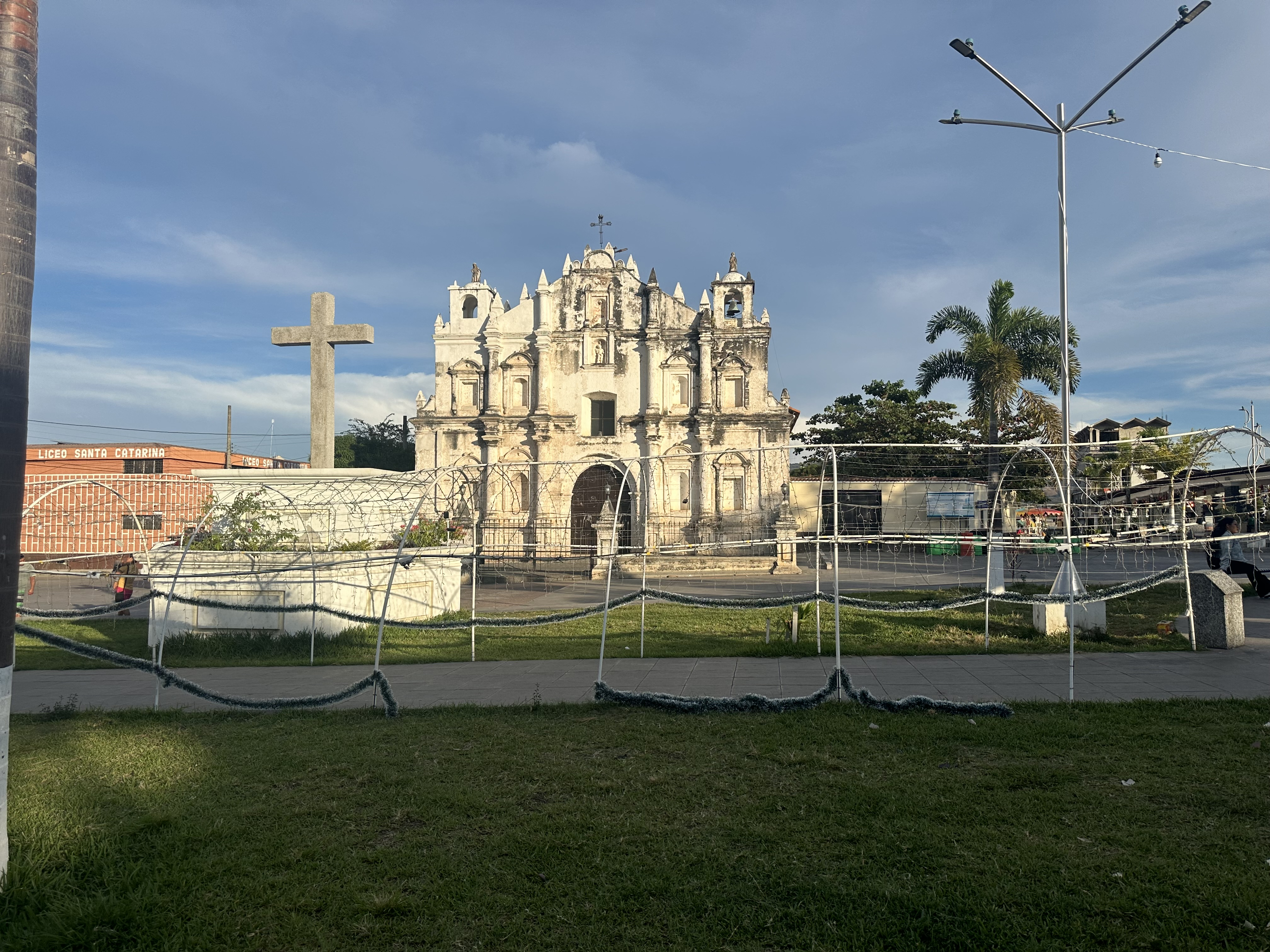
- Central Park, Santa Catarina Mita

- Location in Guatemala
- Coordinates: 14°27′07″N 89°44′35″W
- Country: Guatemala
- Department: Jutiapa

Area
  - Total: 80.0 sq mi (207.2 km^{2})
- Elevation: 2,880.9 ft (878.11 m)

Population (2023)
  - Total: 32,172
  - Density: 402.1/sq mi (155.3/km^{2})
- Climate: Am

Santa Catarina Mita is a municipality in the department of Jutiapa in Guatemala. It covers an area of approximately 207.2 km^{2} (80.0 sq mi). As per 2023 estimates, it has a population of about 32,172 inhabitants.

== History ==
The territory of Santa Catarina Mita was originally inhabited by Pipil and Toltec people. Mita was one of the districts of the Chiquimula department formed by the government decree on 4 November 1825. On 8 May 1852, Mita district was divided into two districts–Asunción Mita and Santa Catarina Mita, and both of them were incorporated as a part of Jutiapa. On 9 November 1853 it was officially declared as a municipality.

== Geography ==
Santa Catarina Mita is a municipality in the department of Jutiapa in Guatemala. It is spread over an area of 207.2 km^{2} (80.0 sq mi).

Located at an elevation of 878.11 m (2,880.9 ft) above sea level, Santa Catarina Mita has a tropical monsoon climate (Köppen climate classification: Am). The district has an average annual temperature of 26.63 °C (79.93 °F). Santa Catarina Mita typically receives about 83.03 mm (3.269 in) of precipitation and has 131.01 rainy days (35.89% of the time) on average annually.

== Demographics ==
Santa Catarina Mita had an estimated population of 32,172 inhabitants in 2023. The population consisted of 15,873 males and 16,299 females. About 26.8% of the population was below the age of fourteen, and 8.1% was over the age of 65 years. About 49.9% of the population was classified as rural, and the rest (50.1%) lived in urban areas. Most of the residents (85.2%) were born in the same municipality. The city had a literacy rate of 84.1%. Ladinos (94%) formed the major ethnic group, with Xinca (4.9%) forming a minority. Spanish (99.4%) was the most spoken language.
