= Jutiapa Department =

Department of Guatemala

Coordinates: 14°16′58″N 89°53′33″W

Jutiapa Department Departmento de Jutiapa
- Department of Guatemala
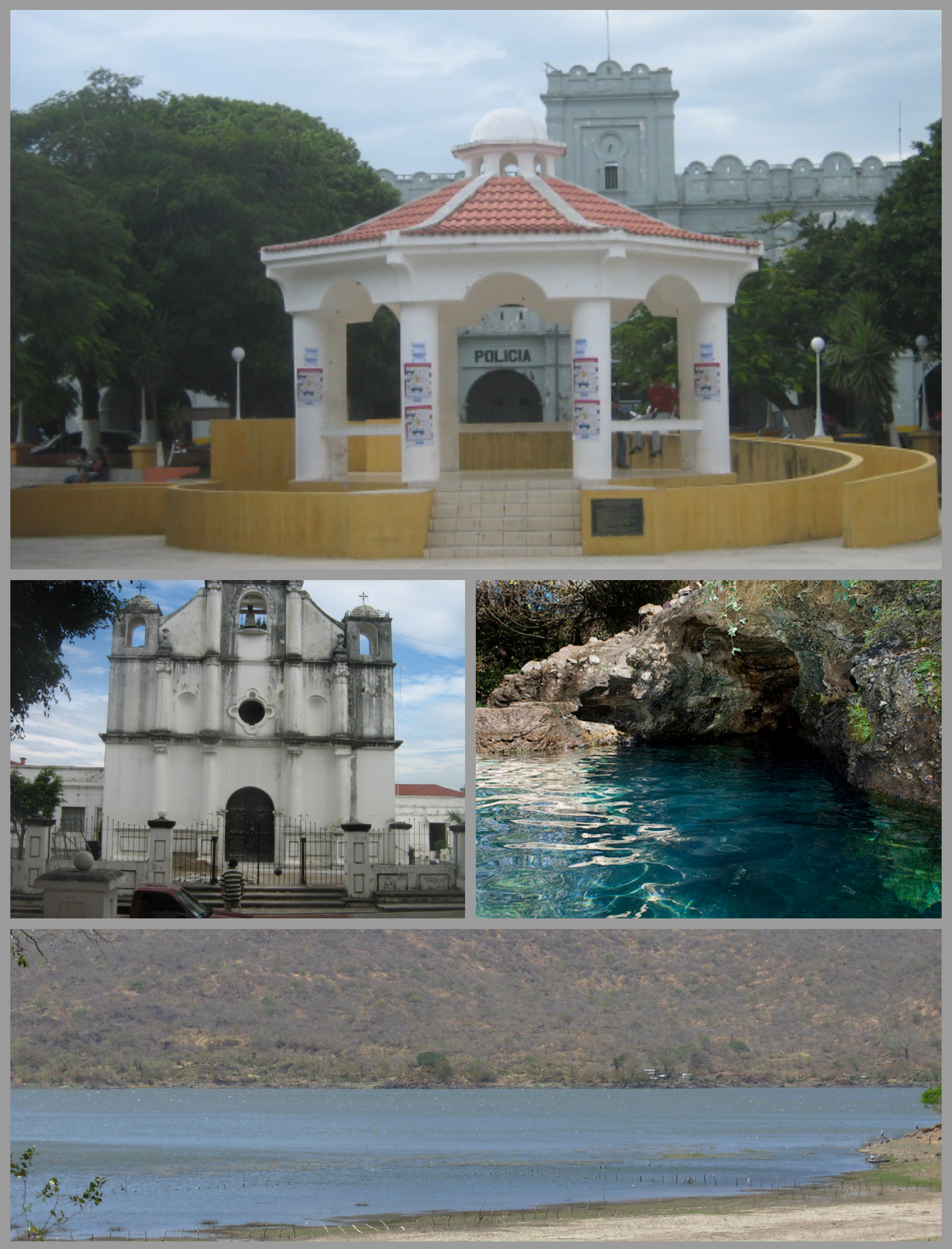
- From the top: Park and kiosk, Church, Anda Mira Cave and Atescatempa Lagoon.

- Coat of arms

- Country: Guatemala
- Capital: Jutiapa
- Municipalities: 17

Government
  - Type: Departmental

Area
  - Department of Guatemala: 3,219 km^{2} (1,243 sq mi)

Population (2018)
  - Department of Guatemala: 488,395
  - Density: 151.7/km^{2} (393.0/sq mi)
  - Urban: 249,754
  - Religions: Roman Catholicism Evangelicalism
- Time zone: UTC-6

Jutiapa Department is a department of Guatemala that borders along El Salvador and the Pacific Ocean. The capital is the city of Jutiapa. As of 2018, it has a population of 488,395. The department is divided into seventeen municipalities. Jutiapa is the country's southeasternmost department and officially the only department with no Mayan descendants native to the region. The main crops are sorghum, tobacco, onion and corn. The climate is dry. An important attraction is the cattle fair. It is at 405 m above sea level.

The population is ethnically "Ladino" (of European descent & non Mayan-indigenous), though in the northern regions of Jutiapa there are few descendants that once belonged to the Xinca population. The Xinca people were of non-Mayan descent.

The coat of arms contains the cornucopia symbolizing Jutiapa as the barn of the East, supplying Guatemala with most of the grain consumed by the people. The horse and the cow represent the cattle; the books stand for educational and cultural advances. In the background sits La Cruz hill, the firm guardian of the departmental chief town, with the tower or antenna of a Jutiapa radio station. Behind the hill float the clouds, the sky and the sun of Jutiapa, "The Sun City". This coat of arms is placed on the flag between two laurel branches symbolizing the daily triumphs of the sons of Jutiapa. The flag is mainly white, showing in its center the coat of arms adapted and adroned, between two laurel branches.

Jutiapa was subject to CIA monitoring in the lead-up to the CIA's successful coup d'état deposing the democratically elected Guatemalan President Jacobo Árbenz.

== Municipalities ==
1. Agua Blanca
2. Asunción Mita
3. Atescatempa
4. Comapa
5. Conguaco
6. El Adelanto
7. El Progreso
8. Jalpatagua
9. Jerez
10. Jutiapa
11. Moyuta
12. Pasaco
13. Quesada
14. San José Acatempa
15. Santa Catarina Mita
16. Yupiltepeque
17. Zapotitlán
