= Jutiapa =

- Municipality
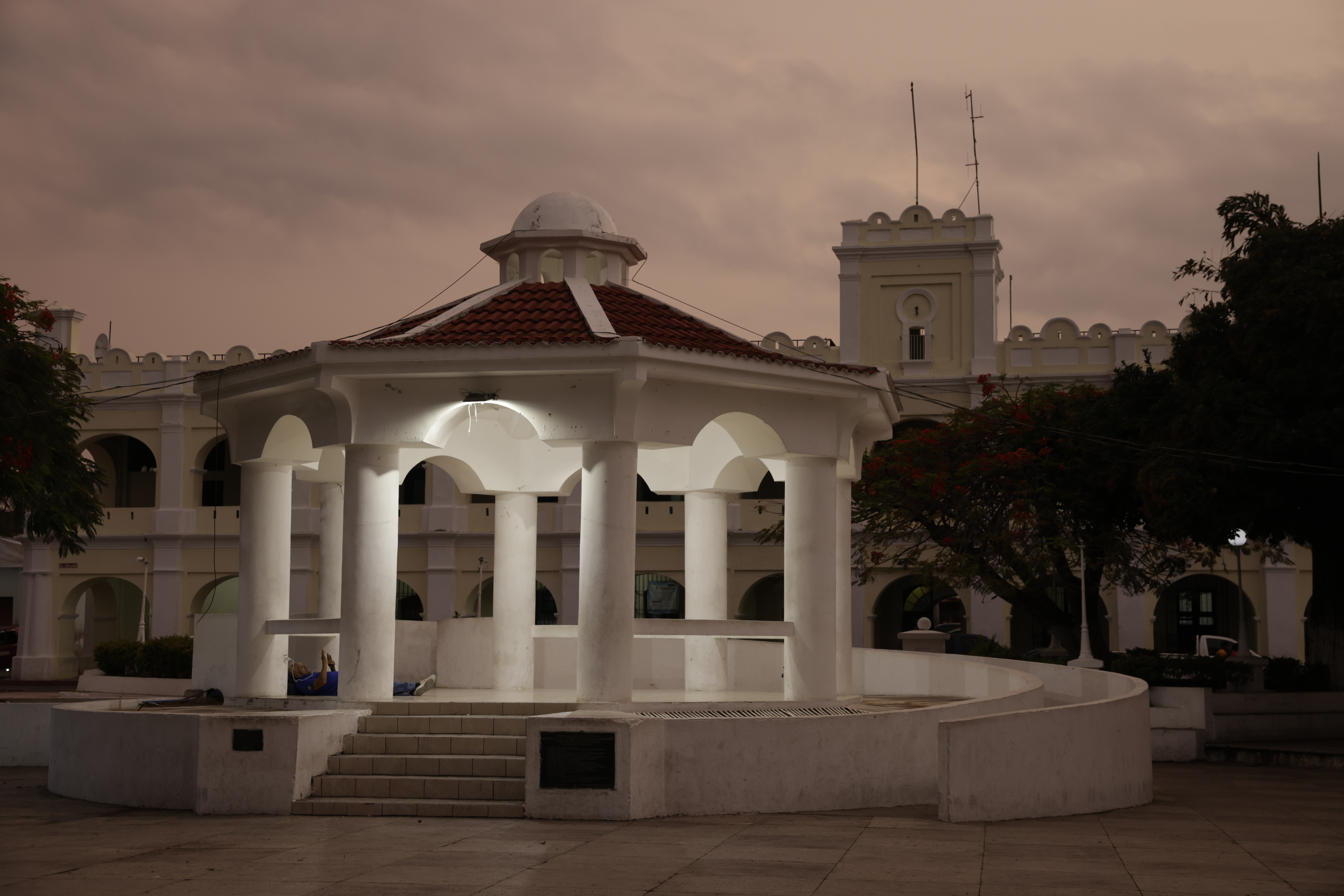
- Jutiapa Park

- Flag Coat of arms
- Motto: Birthplace of the Sun
- Location within Guatemala
- Coordinates: 14°16′58″N 89°53′33″W
- Country: Guatemala
- Department: Jutiapa
- Established: 1852

Area
  - Total: 610.3 km^{2} (235.6 sq mi)
- Elevation: 878.11 m (2,880.9 ft)

Population (2023 estimate)
  - Total: 168,787
  - Density: 276.6/km^{2} (716.3/sq mi)
- Time zone: GMT-6
- Postal code: 22001
- Climate: Am
- Website: Official website

Jutiapa is a city and a municipality in the Jutiapa department of Guatemala. It is the largest city and seat of the department. It covers an area of approximately 610.3 km^{2} (235.6 sq mi). As per 2023 estimates, it has a population of about 168,787 inhabitants. The municipality lies close to the border with El Salvador.

== History ==
Jutiapa might mean "river of jute". It might also have been derived from the Mexican word "xotiapán" which is a combination of the words xochil and apan meaning flower and river respectively. It roughly translates to "river of the flowers".

During the Spanish occupation, Jutiapa belonged to the province of Chiquimula, and it remained so till 1825. In 1839, it became part of the Mita department, which was further subdivided into the departments of Santa Rosa, Jalapa, and Jutiapa in 1852. It was declared as a villageon 8 May 1852 and was elevated to a city on 15 September 1878, which was ratified on 6 September 1921.

== Geography ==
Jutiapa is a municipality and the capital city of the eponymous Jutiapa Department in Guatemala. It is spread over an area of 610.3 km^{2} (235.6 sq mi). It lies on the central highlands in the southeastern part of the country, about 120 km (75 mi) from the national capital of Guatemala city. It borders the municipalities of Monjas and El Progreso to the north, Santa Catarina Mita to the east, Comapa and Jalpatagua to the south, and Quesada, Jalpatagua and Casillas to the west.

Located at an elevation of 878.11 m (2,880.9 ft) above sea level, Jutiapa has a tropical monsoon climate (Köppen climate classification: Am). The district has an average annual temperature of 27.46 °C (81.43 °F). Jutiapa typically receives about 85.59 m (280.8 ft) of precipitation and has 135.06 rainy days (37.0% of the time) on average annually.

== Demographics ==
Jutiapa had an estimated population of 168,787 inhabitants in 2023. The population consisted of 83,620 males and 85,167 females. About 30.0% of the population was below the age of fourteen, and 5.7% was over the age of 65 years. The entire population was classified as urban. Most of the residents (92.6%) were born in the same municipality. The city had a literacy rate of 81.5%. Ladinos (64%) formed the major ethnic group, with Xinca (34.5%) forming a significant minority. Spanish (98.8%) was the most spoken language.

== Economy ==
Jutiapa is a major commercial and administrative centre in the region, and serves as the market for the rural agricultural areas. The major agricultural produce include maize and beans. Local crafts include candles (both tallow and paraffin type); woven hats and other palm products; leather saddles, belts and riding gear; and traditional ceramics.
